= Durham, North Carolina =

Durham
- City
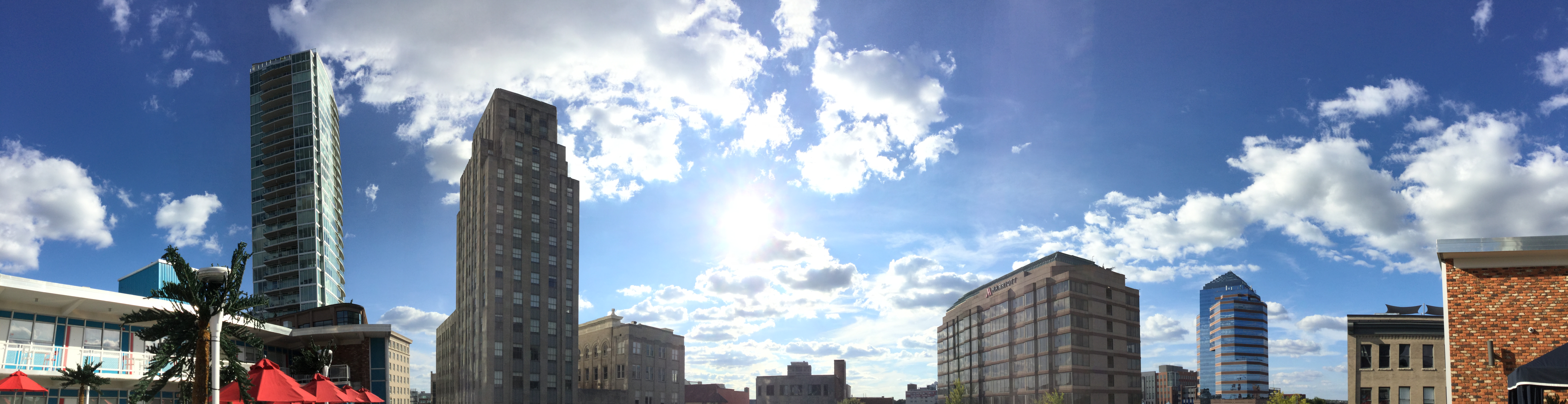
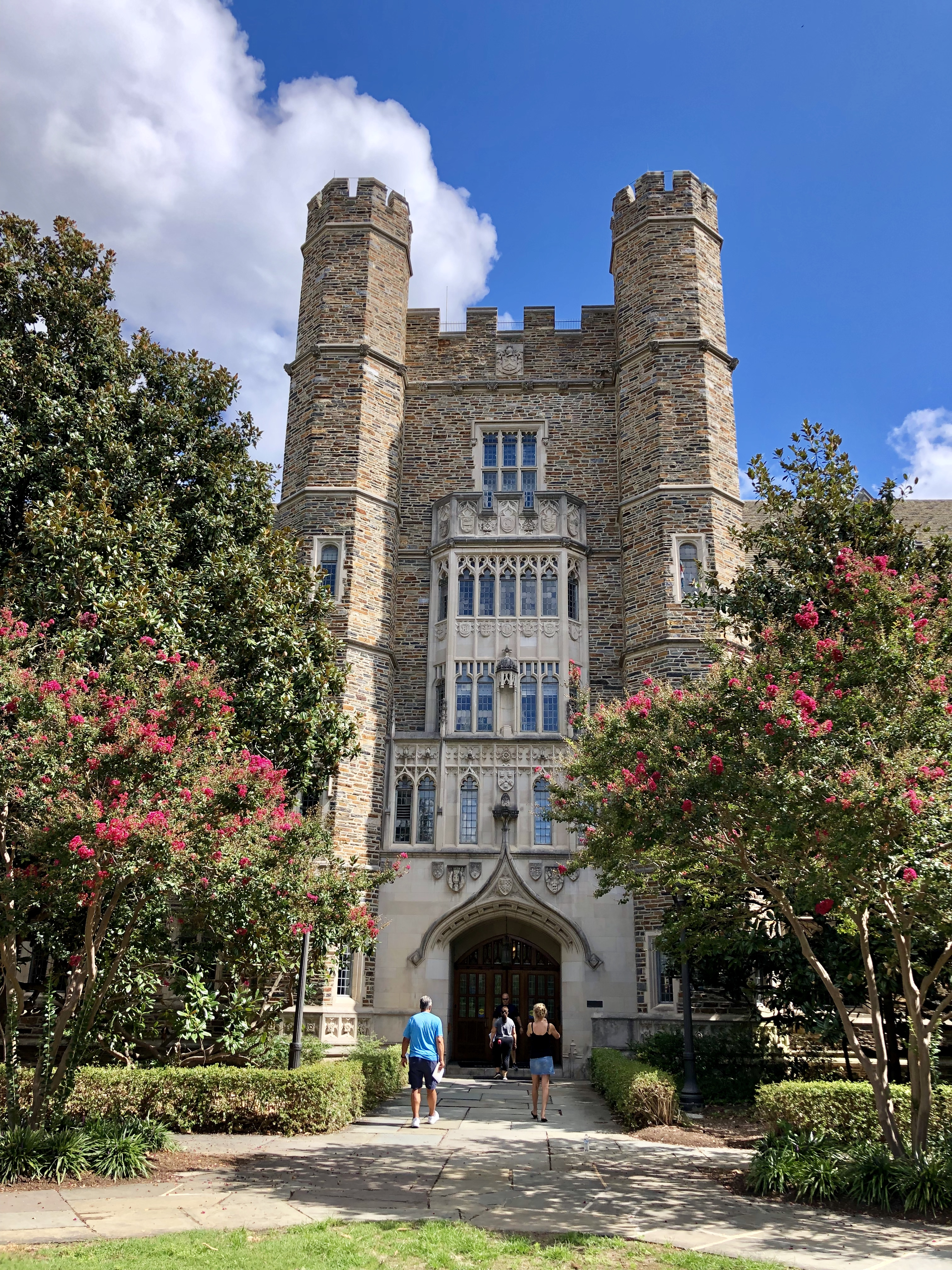
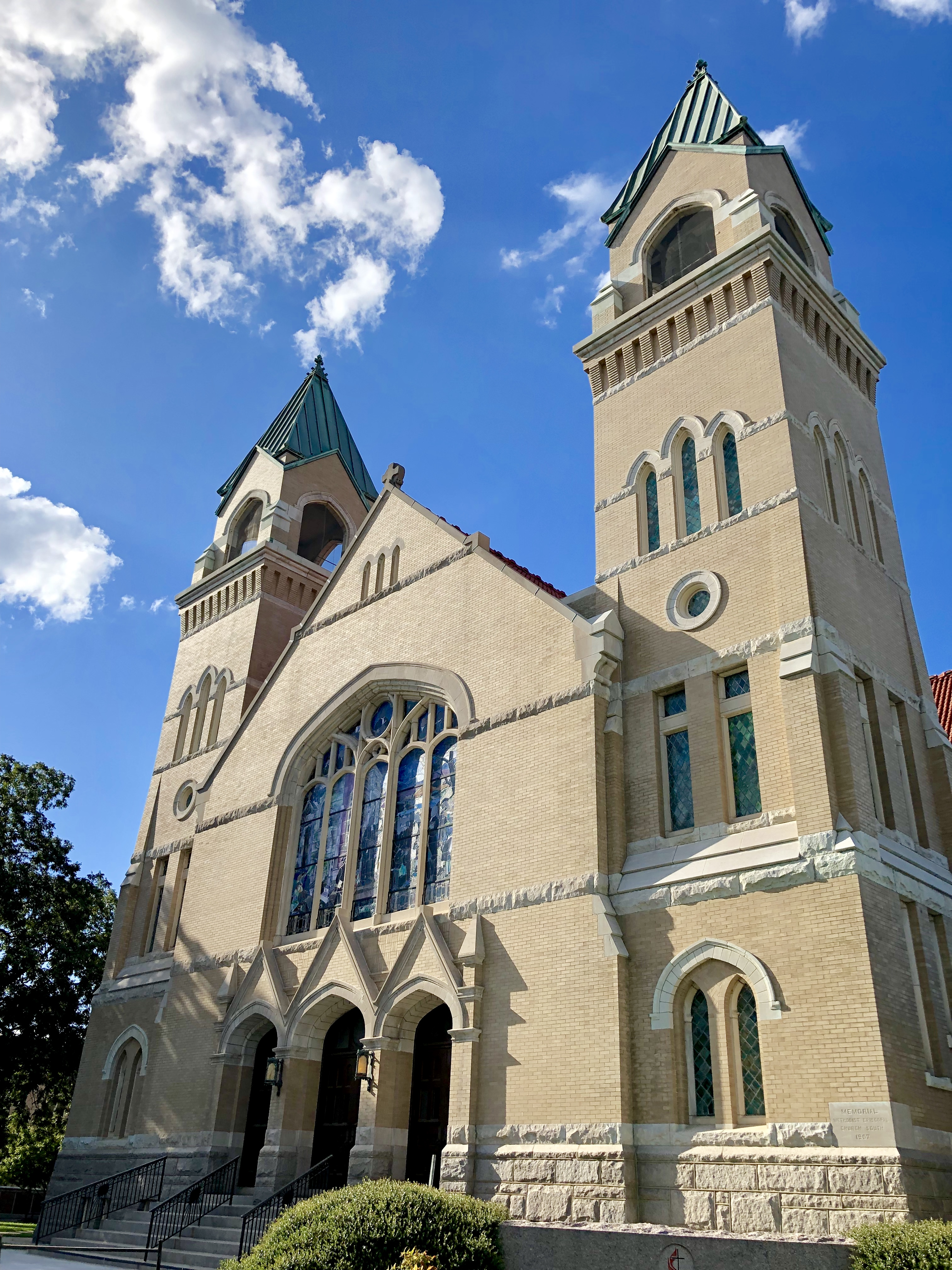
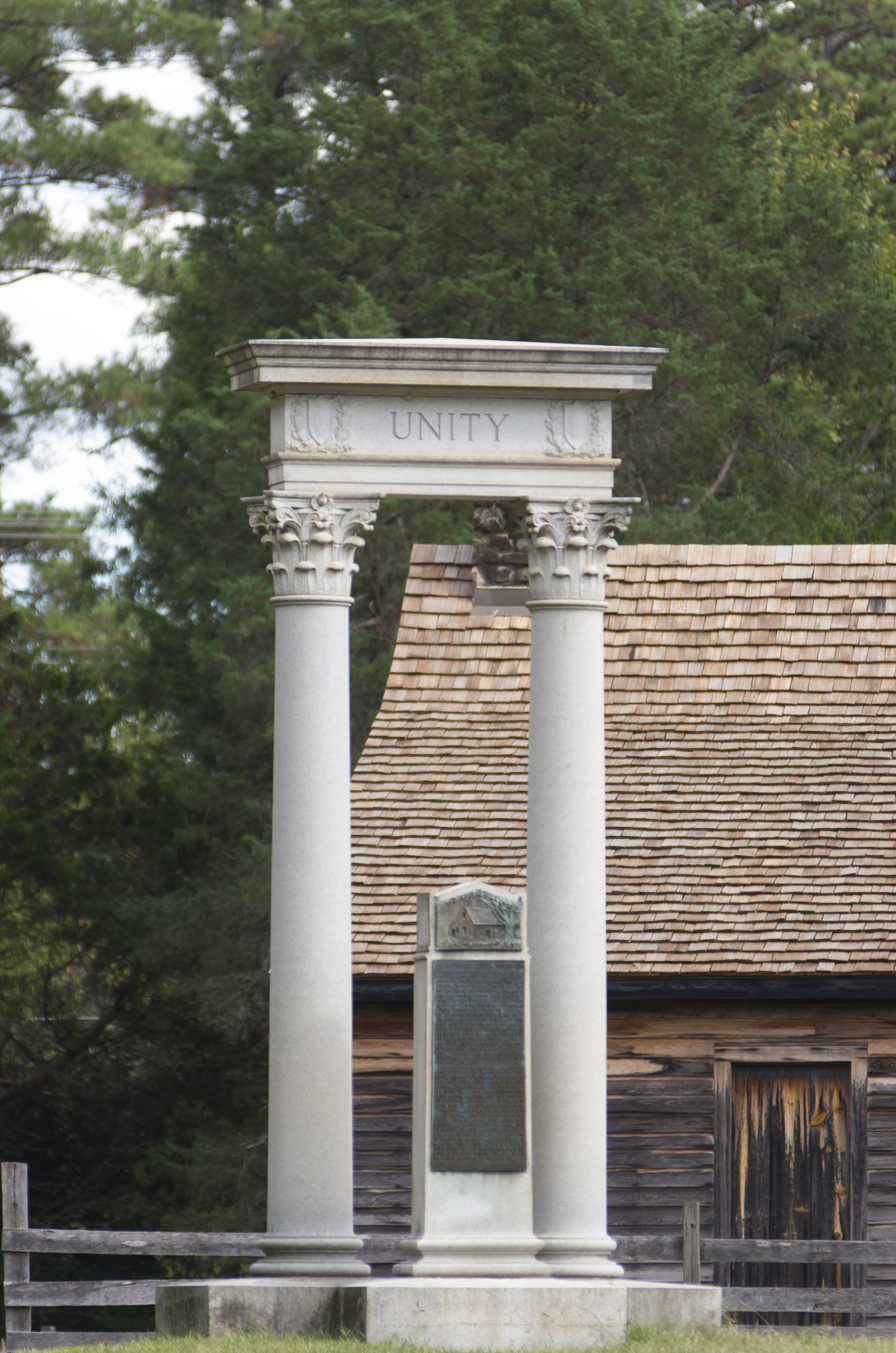
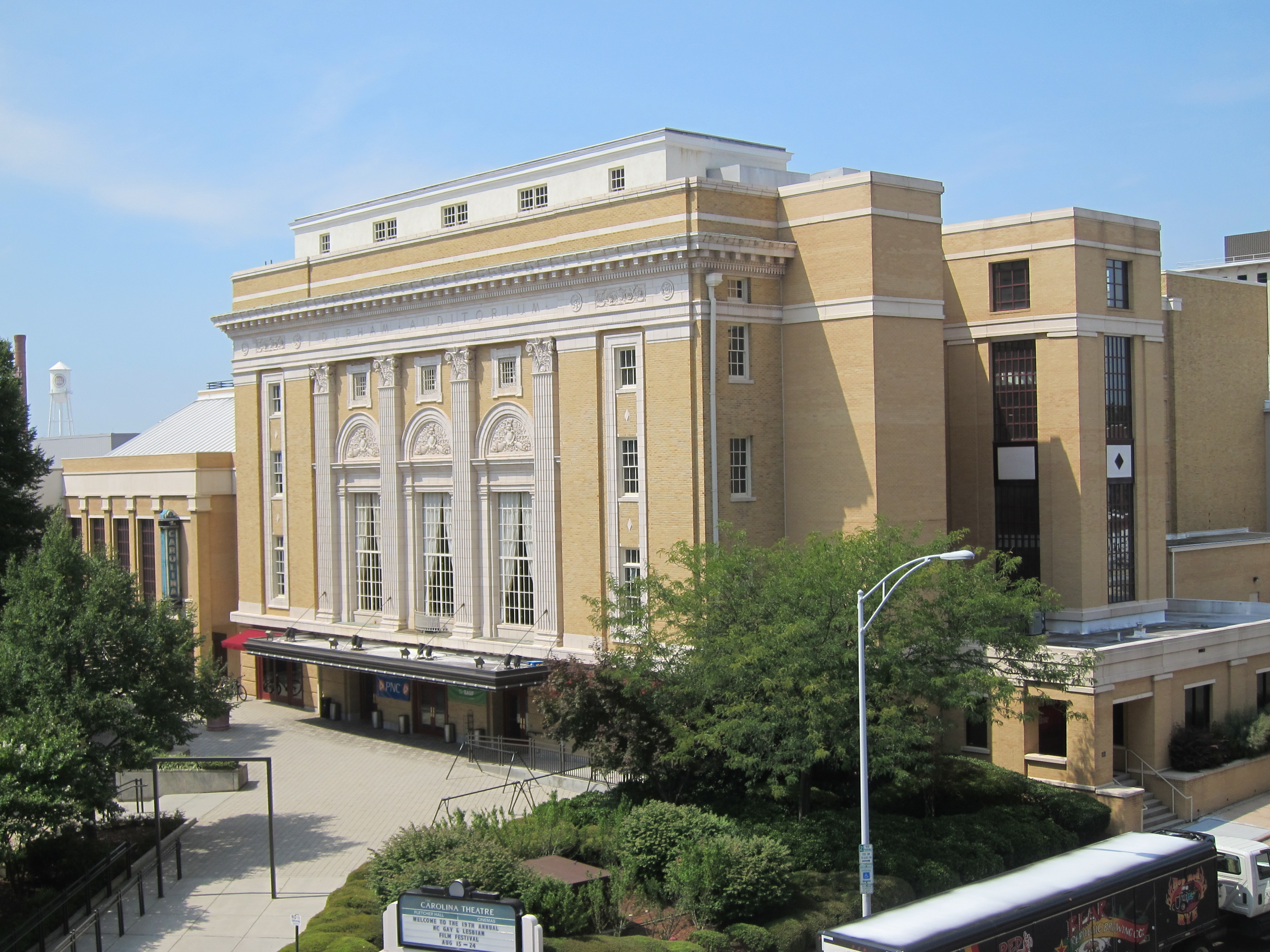
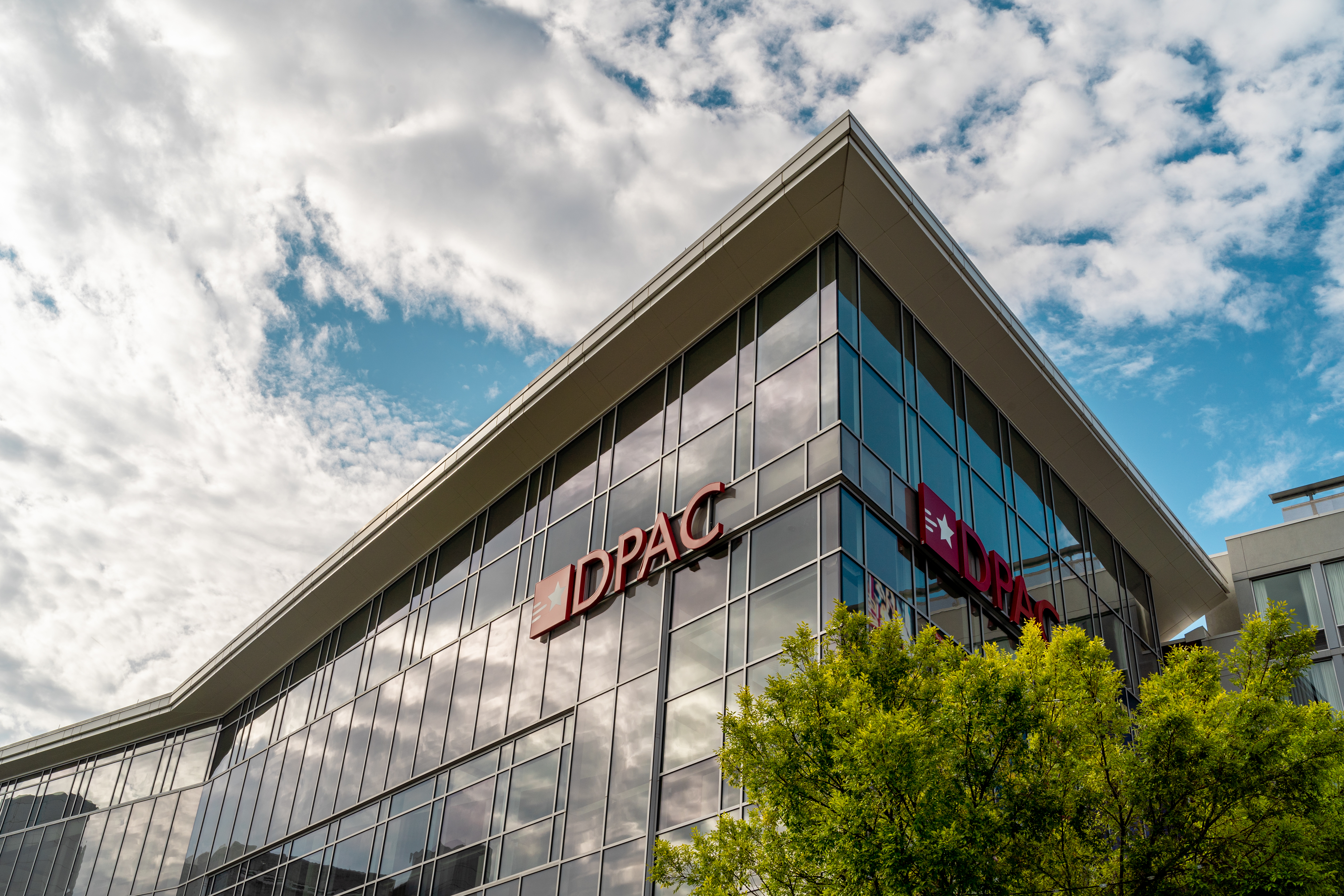
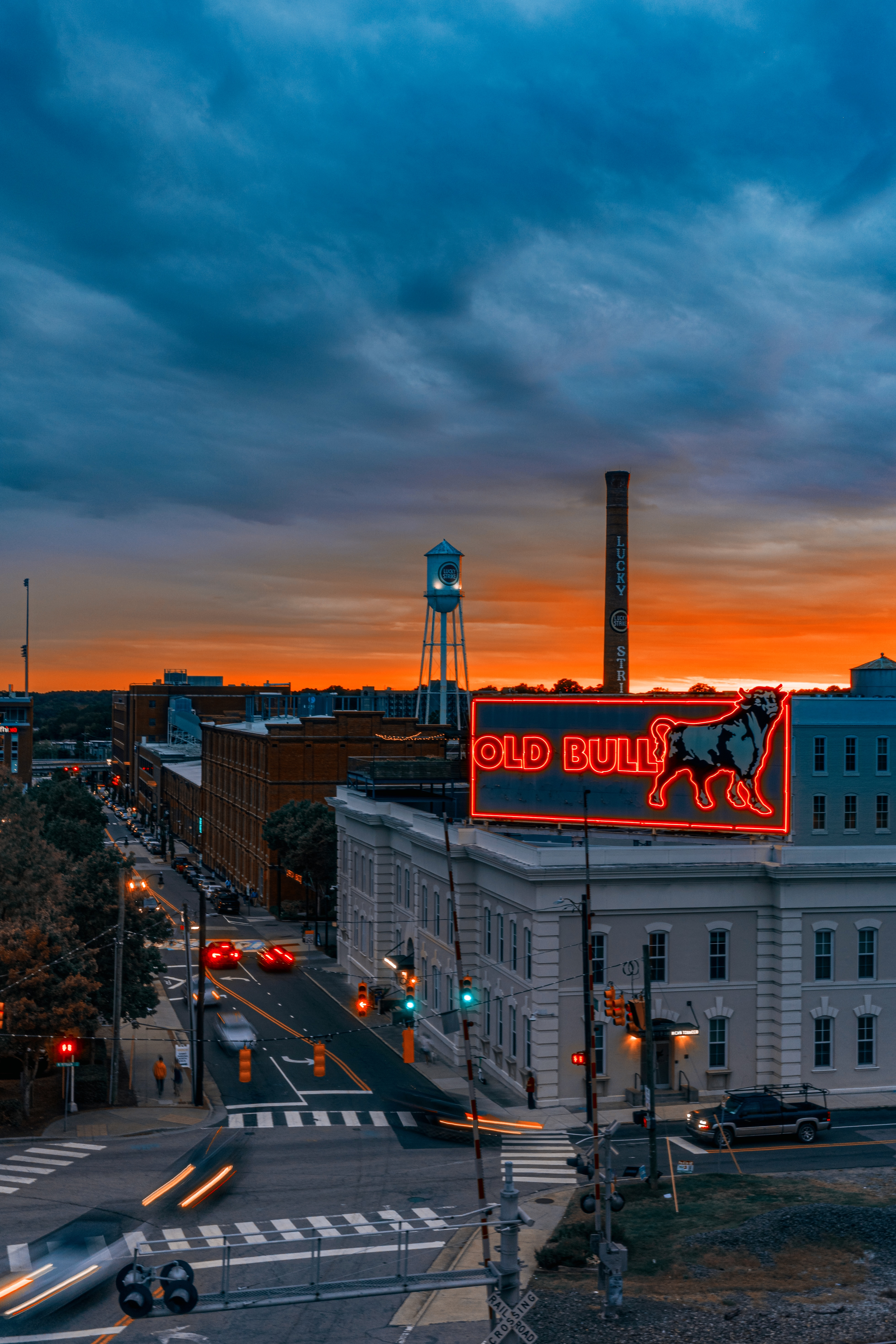
- Durham skyline Duke University Duke Memorial UMC Bennett Place Carolina Theatre Durham Performing Arts Center American Tobacco Historic District

- Flag Seal Logo
- Nicknames: Bull City, City of Medicine
- Interactive map of Durham
- Location within North Carolina Location within the United States
- Coordinates: 35°58′43″N 78°54′00″W
- Country: United States
- State: North Carolina
- Counties: Durham, Wake, Orange
- Incorporated: April 10, 1869
- Named for: Bartlett S. Durham

Government
  - Type: Council–manager
  - Body: Durham City Council
  - Mayor: Leonardo Williams (D)
  - City Manager: Bo Fergerson

Area
  - Total: 116.19 sq mi (300.92 km^{2})
  - Land: 115.36 sq mi (298.79 km^{2})
  - Water: 0.82 sq mi (2.13 km^{2}) 0.71%
- Elevation: 404 ft (123 m)

Population (2020)
  - Total: 283,506
  - Estimate (2025): 305,561 ▲
  - Rank: 70th in the United States; 4th in North Carolina
  - Density: 2,457.5/sq mi (948.85/km^{2})
  - Urban: 396,118 (US: 106th)
  - Urban density: 2,160/sq mi (834.1/km^{2})
  - Metro: 608,879 (US: 94th)
- Demonym: Durhamite
- Time zone: UTC−5 (EST)
  - Summer (DST): UTC−4 (EDT)
- ZIP codes: 27701, 27702, 27703, 27704, 27705, 27706, 27707, 27708, 27709, 27710, 27711, 27712, 27713, 27715, 27717, 27722
- Area codes: 919, 984
- FIPS code: 37-19000
- GNIS feature ID: 2403521
- Website: durhamnc.gov

Durham (/ˈdɜːrəm/ DURR-əm) is a city in the U.S. state of North Carolina, being the county seat of Durham County, with outskirts of the city limits also extending into Orange County and Wake County. Durham is the 4th-most populous city in North Carolina and 70th-most populous city in the United States with a population of 283,506 at the 2020 census. The four-county Durham–Chapel Hill metropolitan area has an estimated 620,000 residents, while the greater Research Triangle area has a population of over 2.37 million people. The city is located in the east-central part of the Piedmont region along the Eno River.

A railway depot was established in 1849 on land donated by Bartlett S. Durham, the eponym of the city. Following the American Civil War, the community of Durham Station expanded rapidly, in part due to the tobacco industry. The town was incorporated by act of the North Carolina General Assembly, in April 1869. The establishment of Durham County was ratified by the General Assembly 12 years later, in 1881. It became known as the founding place and headquarters of the American Tobacco Company. Textile and electric power industries also played an important role. While these industries have declined, Durham underwent revitalization and population growth to become an educational, medical, and research center.

Durham is home to several recognized institutions of higher education, most notably Duke University and North Carolina Central University. Durham is also a national leader in health-related activities, which are focused on the Duke University Hospital and many private companies. Duke and its Duke University Health System are the largest employers in the city. North Carolina Central University is a historically black university that is part of the University of North Carolina System. Together, the two universities make Durham one of the vertices of the Research Triangle area; central to this is the Research Triangle Park south of Durham, which encompasses an area of 11 square miles and is devoted to research facilities.

On the Duke University campus are the neo-Gothic Duke Chapel, the Nasher Museum of Art and the Wallace Wade Stadium. Other notable sites in the city include the Museum of Life and Science, Durham Performing Arts Center, Carolina Theatre, and Duke Homestead and Tobacco Factory. Bennett Place commemorates the location where Joseph E. Johnston surrendered to William T. Sherman in the American Civil War. The city is served, along with Raleigh, by Raleigh–Durham International Airport.

== History ==
=== Pre-establishment ===
The Eno and the Occoneechi, related to the Sioux and the Shakori, lived in the area and may have established a village named Adshusheer (or Ajusher) in the area which became Durham. The Occaneechi Path, a corridor of trading roads and trails, went through the area. Native Americans expanded the region by establishing settlements and commercial transportation routes.

In 1701, English explorer John Lawson, documented the area and would later call it "the flower of the Carolinas". Lawson claimed that Ajusher was situated 14 miles (23 km) from Occaneechi Town. In the mid-1700s, Scots, Irish, and English colonists settled on land granted to George Carteret by King Charles I, a grant that had by then been inherited by his great-grandson John. Early settlers built settlements as well as farms and mills, like West Point Mill.

Frontiersmen in the area, prior to the American Revolutionary War, participated in the Regulator Movement. Loyalist militia used Cornwallis Road to cut through the area in 1771 to quell the rebellion. William Johnston, a local a farmer and shopkeeper, made munitions for the Continental Army, served in the Provincial Congress in 1775, and financially supported Daniel Boone on his westward explorations.

=== Antebellum and Civil War ===
Prior to the arrival of the railroad, the area now known as Durham was the eastern part of present-day Orange County and was almost entirely agricultural, with a few businesses catering to travelers (particularly livestock drivers) along the Hillsborough Road. This road, eventually followed by US Route 70, was the major east–west route in North Carolina from colonial times until the construction of interstate highways. Steady population growth and an intersection with the road connecting Roxboro and Fayetteville made the area near this site suitable for a US Post Office. Roxboro, Fayetteville and Hillsborough Roads remain major thoroughfares in Durham, although they no longer exactly follow their early 19th century rights-of-way.

Large plantations, Hardscrabble, Fairntosh, Lipscomb, Walnut Hall, Patterson, and Leigh among them, were established in the antebellum period. By 1860, Stagville Plantation lay at the center of one of the largest plantation holdings in the South. African slaves were brought to labor on these farms and plantations, and slave quarters became the hearth of distinctively Southern cultural traditions involving crafts, social relations, life rituals, music, and dance. There were free African-Americans in the area as well, including several who fought in the Revolutionary War.

Durham's location is a result of the needs of the 19th century railroad industry. The wood-burning steam locomotives of the time had to stop frequently for wood and water and the new North Carolina Railroad needed a depot between the settled towns of Raleigh and Hillsborough. The residents of what is now downtown Durham thought their businesses catering to livestock drivers had a better future than "a new-fangled nonsense like a railroad" and refused to sell or lease land for a depot. In 1849, a North Carolina Railroad depot was established on a four-acre tract of land donated by Dr. Bartlett S. Durham; the station was named after him in recognition of his gift. A U.S. post office was established there on April 26, 1853, now recognized as the city's official birthday.

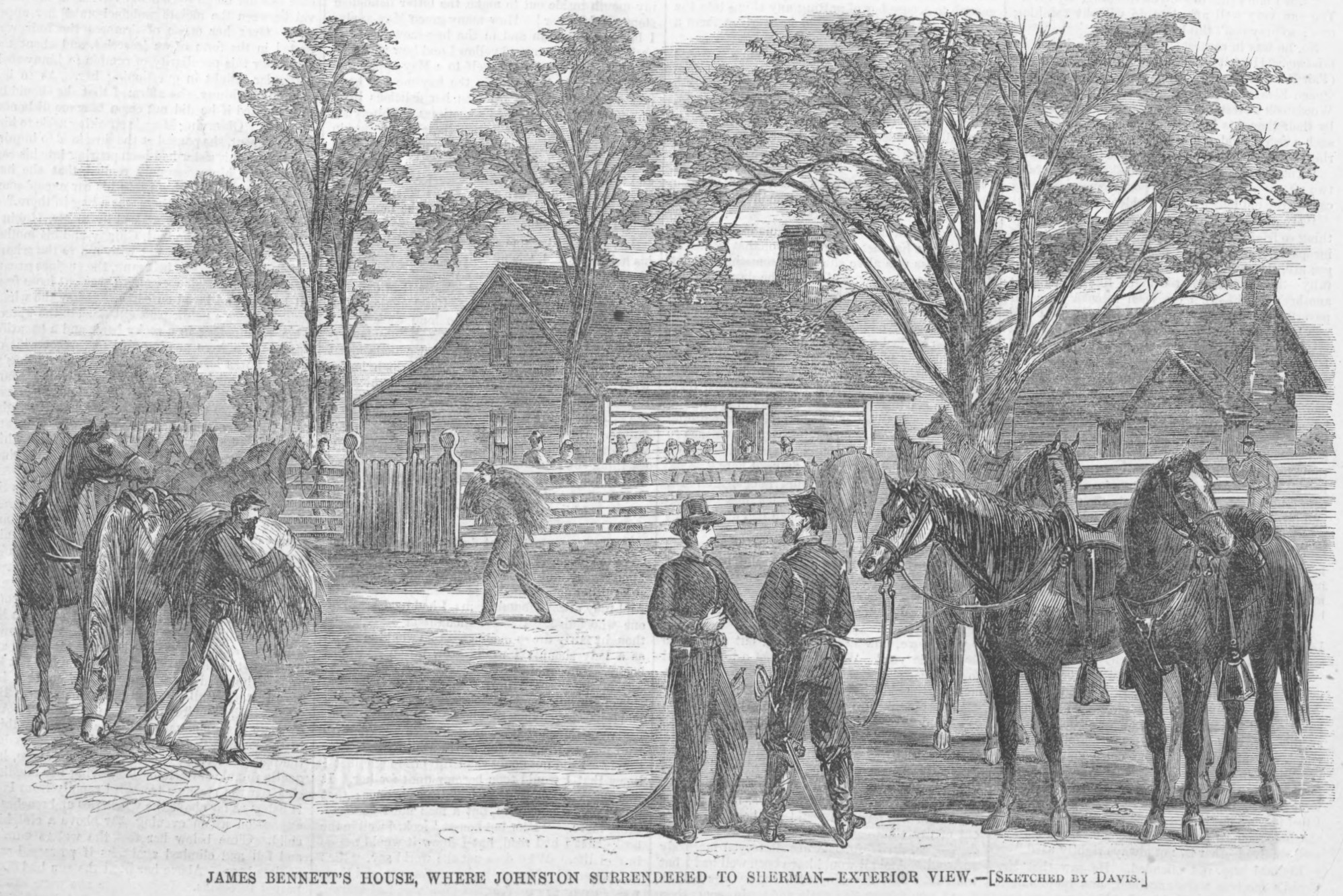
The Confederate surrender at Bennett Place

Durham Station, as it was known for its first 20 years, was a depot for the occasional passenger or express package until early April 1865, when the Federal Army commanded by Major General William T. Sherman occupied the nearby state capital of Raleigh during the American Civil War. The last formidable Confederate Army in the South, commanded by General Joseph E. Johnston, was headquartered in Greensboro 50 miles (80 km) to the west. After the surrender of the Army of Northern Virginia by Gen. Robert E. Lee at Appomattox, Virginia on April 9, 1865, Gen. Johnston sought surrender terms, which were negotiated on April 17, 18 and 26 at Bennett Place, the small farm of James and Nancy Bennett, located halfway between the army's lines about 3 miles (4.8 km) west of Durham Station.

As both armies passed through Durham, Hillsborough, and surrounding Piedmont communities, they enjoyed the mild flavor of the area's Brightleaf tobacco, which was considered more pleasant to smoke or chew than was available back home after the war. Some began sending letters to Durham to get more.

=== Reconstruction and the rise of Durham tobacco ===
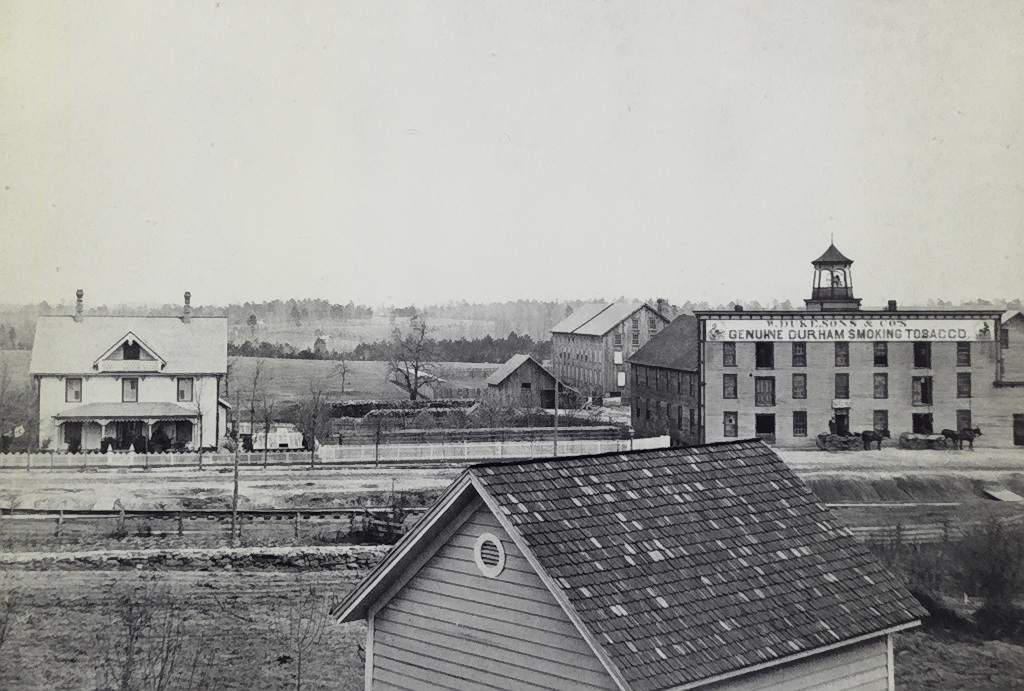
Early view of first Duke tobacco factory and family home, Durham, 1883

The community of Durham Station grew slowly before the Civil War, but expanded rapidly following the war. Much of this growth attributed to the establishment of a thriving tobacco industry. Veterans returned home after the war with an interest in acquiring more of the tobacco they had sampled in North Carolina. Numerous orders were mailed to John Ruffin Green's tobacco company requesting more of the Durham tobacco. W.T. Blackwell partnered with Green and renamed the company as the "Bull Durham Tobacco Factory". The name "Bull Durham" is said to have been taken from the bull on the British Colman's Mustard, which Mr. Blackwell mistakenly believed was manufactured in Durham, England. Mustard known as Durham Mustard was originally produced in Durham, England, by Mrs Clements and later by Ainsley during the eighteenth century. However, production of the original Durham Mustard has now been passed into the hands of Colman's of Norwich, England.

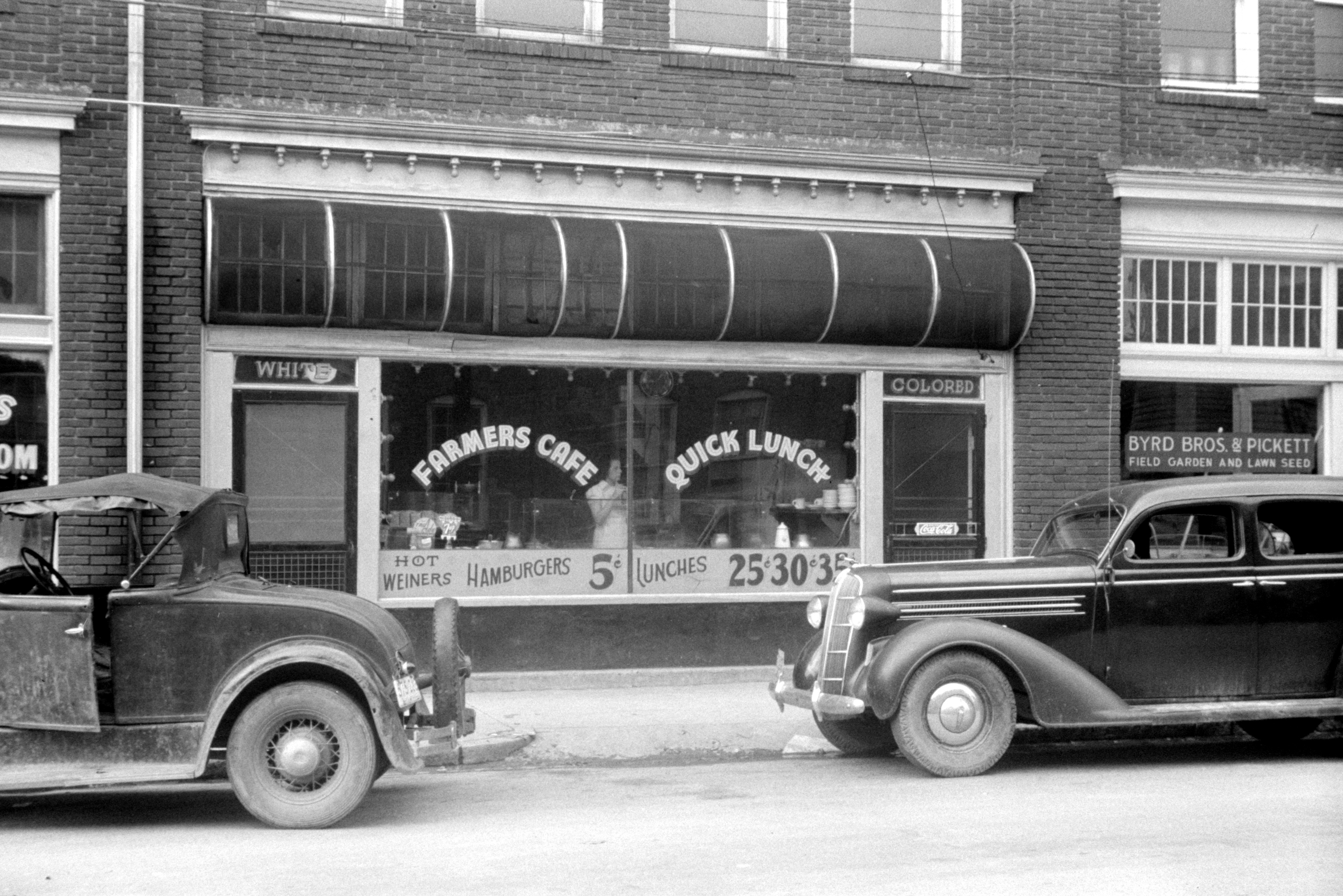
Separate "white" and "colored" entrances to a cafe in Durham, North Carolina, 1940

=== Incorporation ===
As Durham Station's population rapidly increased, the station became a town and was incorporated by act of the North Carolina General Assembly, on April 10, 1869. It was named for the man who provided the land on which the station was built, Dr. Bartlett Durham. At the time of its incorporation by the General Assembly, Durham was located in Orange County. The increase in business activity, land transfers etc., made the day long trip back and forth to the county seat in Hillsborough untenable, so twelve years later, on April 17, 1881, a bill for the establishment of Durham County was ratified by the General Assembly, having been introduced by Caleb B.Green, creating Durham County from the eastern portion of Orange County and the western portion of Wake County. In 1911, parts of Cedar Fork Township of Wake County was transferred to Durham County and became Carr Township.

=== Early growth (1900–1970) ===
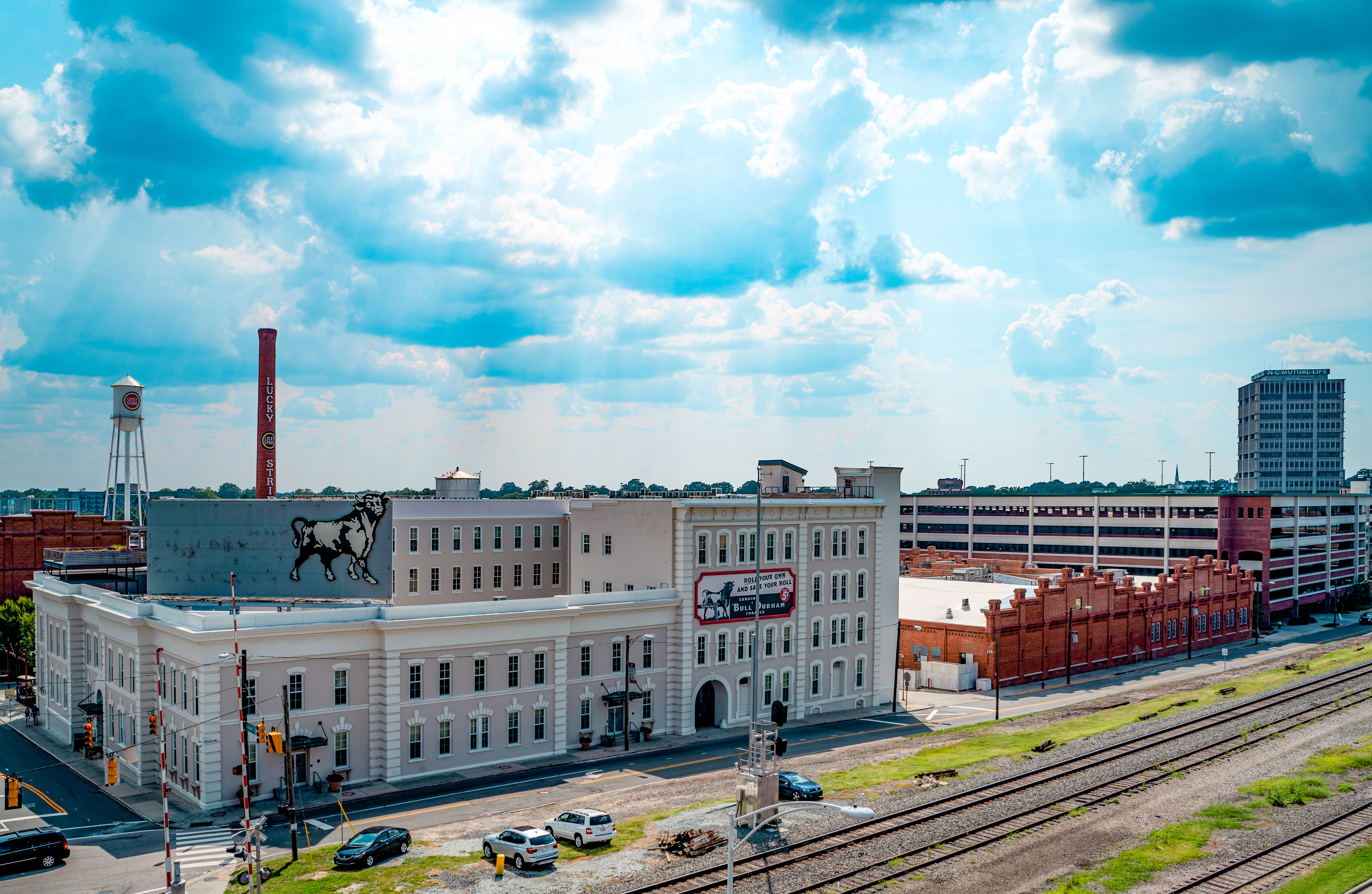
Overlooking the American Tobacco Campus

The rapid growth and prosperity of the Bull Durham Tobacco Company, and Washington Duke's W. Duke & Sons Tobacco Company, resulted in the rapid growth of the city of Durham. Throughout the Gilded Age and into the early twentieth century, Durham industrialists, including George Washington Watts, John Sprunt Hill, and Julian S. Carr, built large mansions such as Somerset Villa, Harwood Hall, the John Sprunt Hill House, and Greystone Manor. Washington Duke was a good businessman, but his sons were brilliant and established what amounted to a monopoly of the smoking and chewing tobacco business in the United States by 1900. In the early 1910s, the Federal Government forced a breakup of the Duke's business under the antitrust laws. The Dukes retained what became known as American Tobacco, a major corporation in its own right, with manufacturing based in Durham. American Tobacco's ubiquitous advertisements on radio shows beginning in the 1930s and television shows up to 1970 was the nation's image of Durham until Duke University supplanted it in the late 20th century.

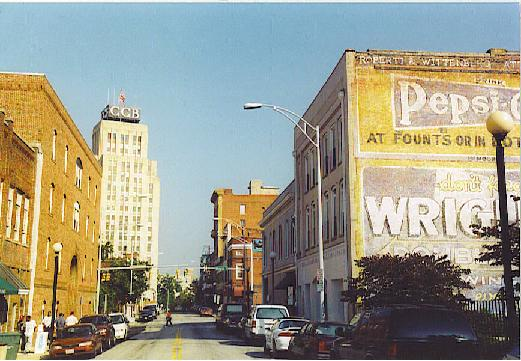
Looking west along Parrish Street, home of what was then known as Black Wall Street

Prevented from further investment in the tobacco industry, the Dukes turned to the then new industry of electric power generation, which they had been investing in since the early 1890s. Duke Power (now Duke Energy) brought in electricity from hydroelectric dams in the western mountains of North Carolina through the newly invented technology of high voltage power lines. At this time (1910–1920), the few towns and cities in North Carolina that had electricity depended on local "powerhouses". These were large, noisy, and smoky coal-fired plants located next to the railroad tracks. Duke Power quickly took over the electricity franchises in these towns and then electrified all the other towns of central and western North Carolina, making even more money than they ever made from tobacco. Duke Power also had a significant business in local franchises for public transit (buses and trolleys) before local government took over this responsibility in the mid- to late 20th century. Duke Power ran Durham's public bus system (now GoDurham) until 1991.

The success of the tobacco industry in the late 19th and early 20th century encouraged the then-growing textile industry to locate just outside Durham. The early electrification of Durham was also a large incentive. Drawing a labor force from the economic demise of single-family farms in the region at the time, these textile mills doubled the population of Durham. These areas were known as East Durham and West Durham until they were eventually annexed by the City of Durham.

Much of the early city architecture, both commercial and residential, dates from the period of 1890–1930. Durham recorded its worst fire in history on March 23, 1914. The multimillion-dollar blaze destroyed a large portion of the downtown business district. The fire department's water source failed during the blaze, prompting voters to establish a city-owned water system in place of the private systems that had served the city since 1887.

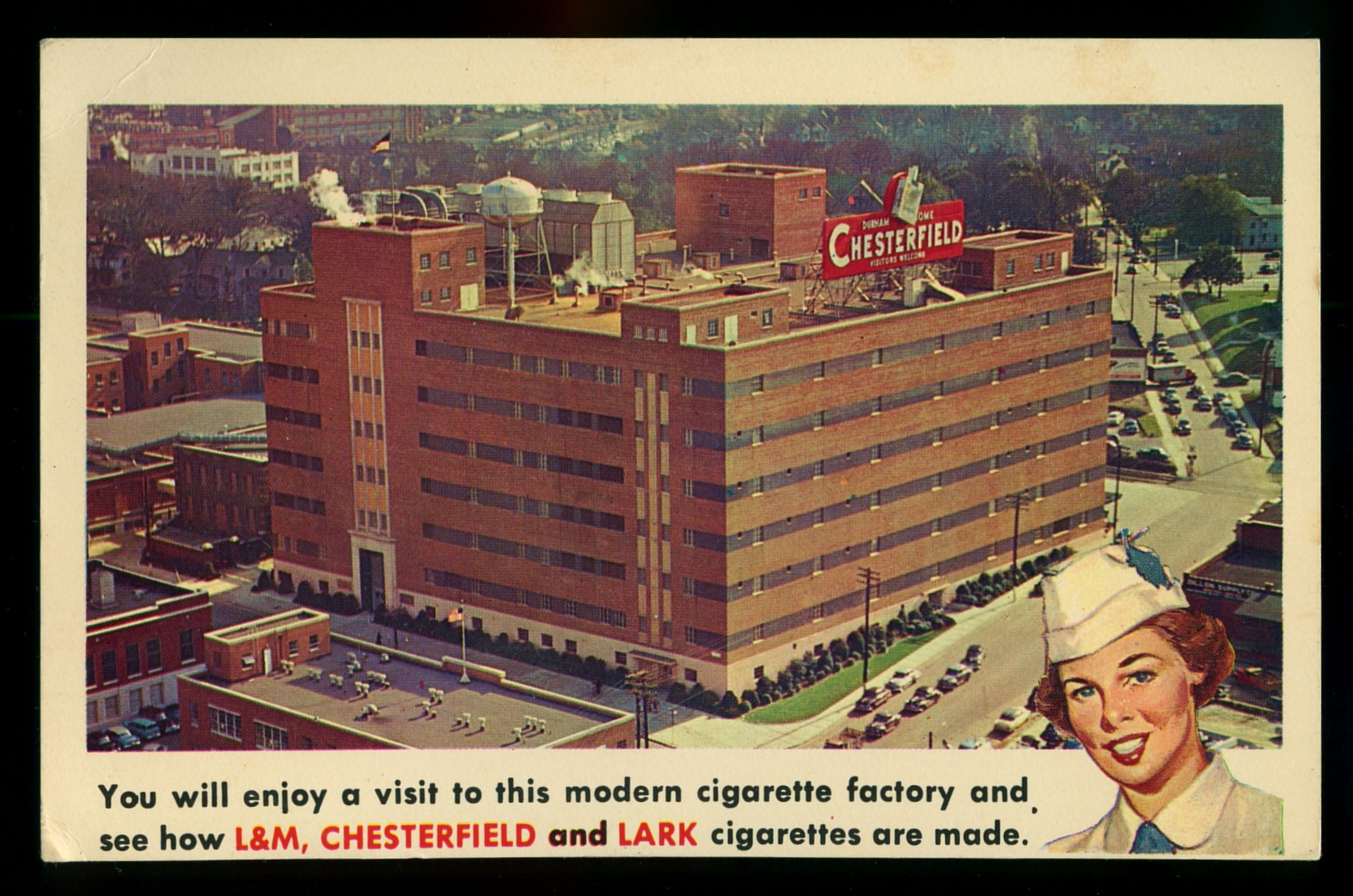
Advertisement for a tour of the Chesterfield tobacco factory, 1965

Durham quickly developed a black community, the center of which was an area known as Hayti, (pronounced HAY-tie), just south of the center of town, where some of the most prominent and successful black-owned businesses in the country during the early 20th century were established. These businesses — the best known of which are North Carolina Mutual Life Insurance Company and Mechanics & Farmers Bank — were centered on Parrish St., which would come to be known as "Black Wall Street". In 1910, Dr. James E. Shepard founded North Carolina Central University, the nation's first publicly supported liberal arts college for African-Americans.

In 1924, James Buchanan Duke established a philanthropic foundation in honor of his father Washington Duke to support Trinity College in Durham. The college changed its name to Duke University and built a large campus and hospital a mile west of Trinity College (the original site of Trinity College is now known as the Duke East Campus).

Durham's manufacturing fortunes declined during the mid-20th century. Textile mills began to close during the 1930s. Competition from other tobacco companies (as well as a decrease in smoking after the 1960s) reduced revenues from Durham's tobacco industry.

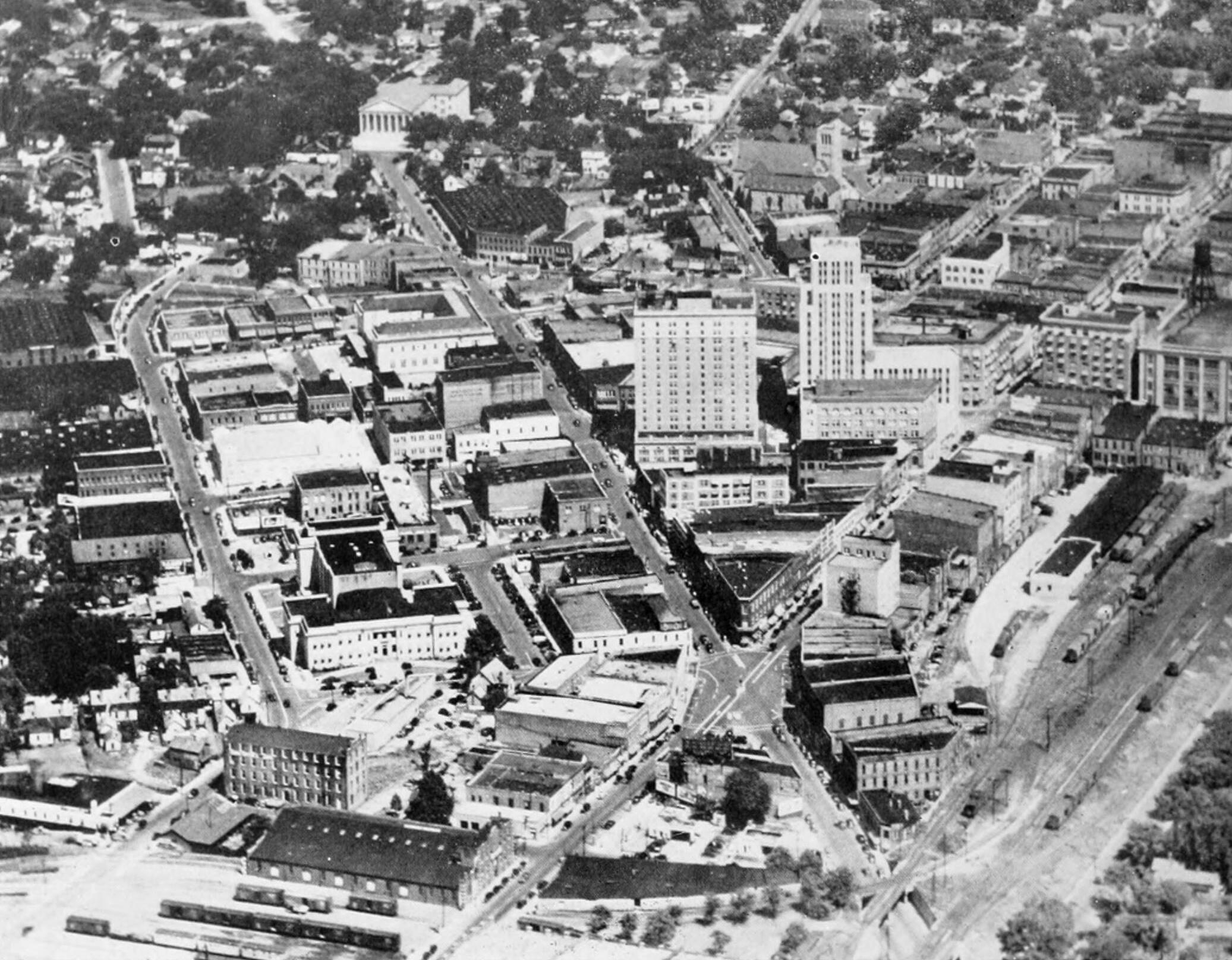
Downtown Durham, 1942 or earlier

In a far-sighted move in the late 1950s, Duke University, along with the University of North Carolina in Chapel Hill and North Carolina State University in Raleigh, persuaded the North Carolina Legislature to purchase a large tract of sparsely settled land in southern Durham County and create the nation's first "science park" for industry. Cheap land and a steady supply of trained workers from the local universities made the Research Triangle Park an enormous success which, along with the expansion resulting from the clinical and scientific advances of Duke Medical Center and Duke University, more than made up for the decline of Durham's tobacco and textile industries.

=== Civil rights movement ===
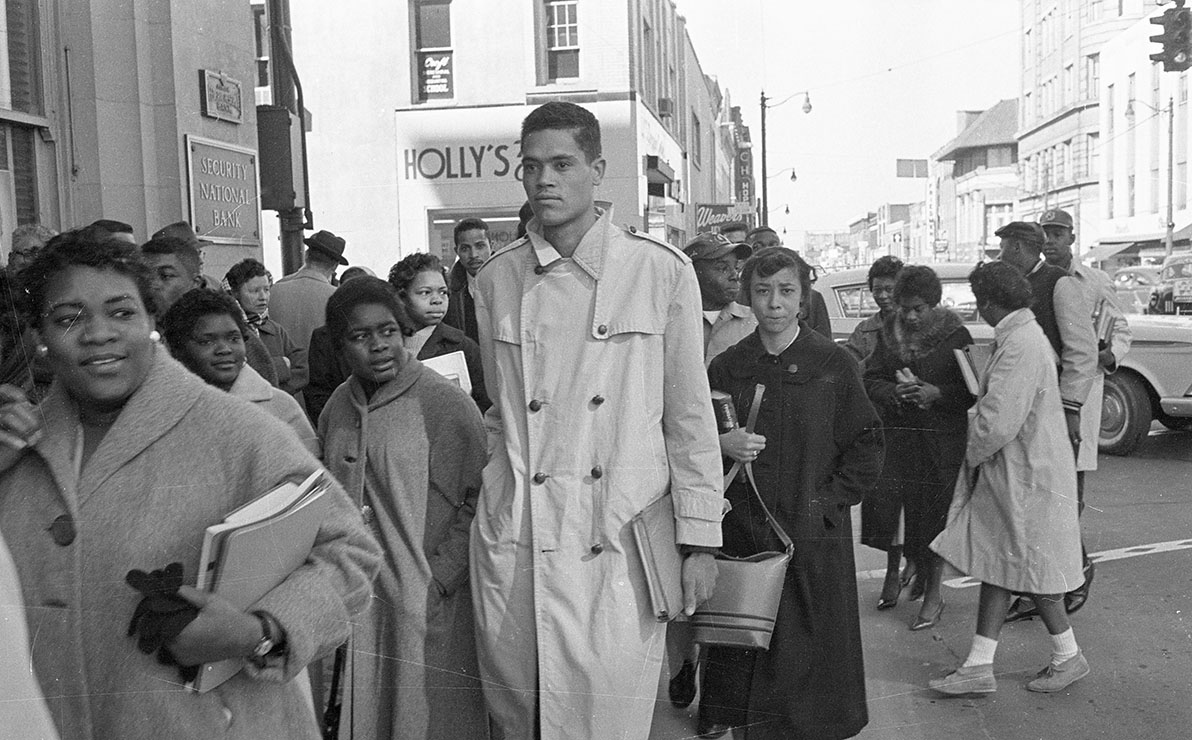
Civil Rights protestors at the Woolworth's Sit-In in Durham in 1960

As a result of its substantial African-American community, including many activists, a prominent civil rights movement developed in Durham. Multiple sit-ins were held, and Martin Luther King Jr., visited the city during the struggle for equal rights. The Durham Committee on Negro Affairs, organized in 1935 by C.C. Spaulding, Louis Austin, Conrad Pearson, and James E. Shepard, has been cited nationally for its role in fighting for black voting rights. The committee also has used its voting strength to pursue social and economic rights for African-Americans and other ethnic groups. In 1957, Douglas E. Moore, minister of Durham's Asbury Temple Methodist Church, along with other religious and community leaders, pioneered sit-ins throughout North Carolina to protest discrimination at lunch counters that served only whites.

Widely credited as the first sit-in of the civil rights movement in North Carolina, on June 23, 1957, Moore and six others assembled at the church to plan the protest. The young African Americans moved over to the segregated Royal Ice Cream Parlor and took up whites-only booths. When they refused to budge, the manager called the police who charged them with trespassing. Unlike the Greensboro Four, three years later, the Royal Seven were arrested and ultimately found guilty of trespassing.

The six-month-long sit-in at a Woolworth's counter in Greensboro, North Carolina, captured the nation's attention. Within a week, students from North Carolina College at Durham and Duke University staged a sit-in in Durham. About a week later, Martin Luther King Jr. met Moore in Durham, where King coined his famous rallying cry "Fill up the jails," during a speech at White Rock Baptist Church. Advocating non-violent confrontation with segregation laws for the first time, King said, "Let us not fear going to jail. If the officials threaten to arrest us for standing up for our rights, we must answer by saying that we are willing and prepared to fill up the jails of the South."

This community was not enough to prevent the demolition of portions of the Hayti district for the construction of the Durham Freeway during the late 1960s. The freeway construction resulted in losses to other historic neighborhoods, including Morehead Hill, West End, and West Durham. Combined with large-scale demolition using Urban Renewal funds, Durham suffered significant losses to its historic architectural base.

=== 1970s–present ===
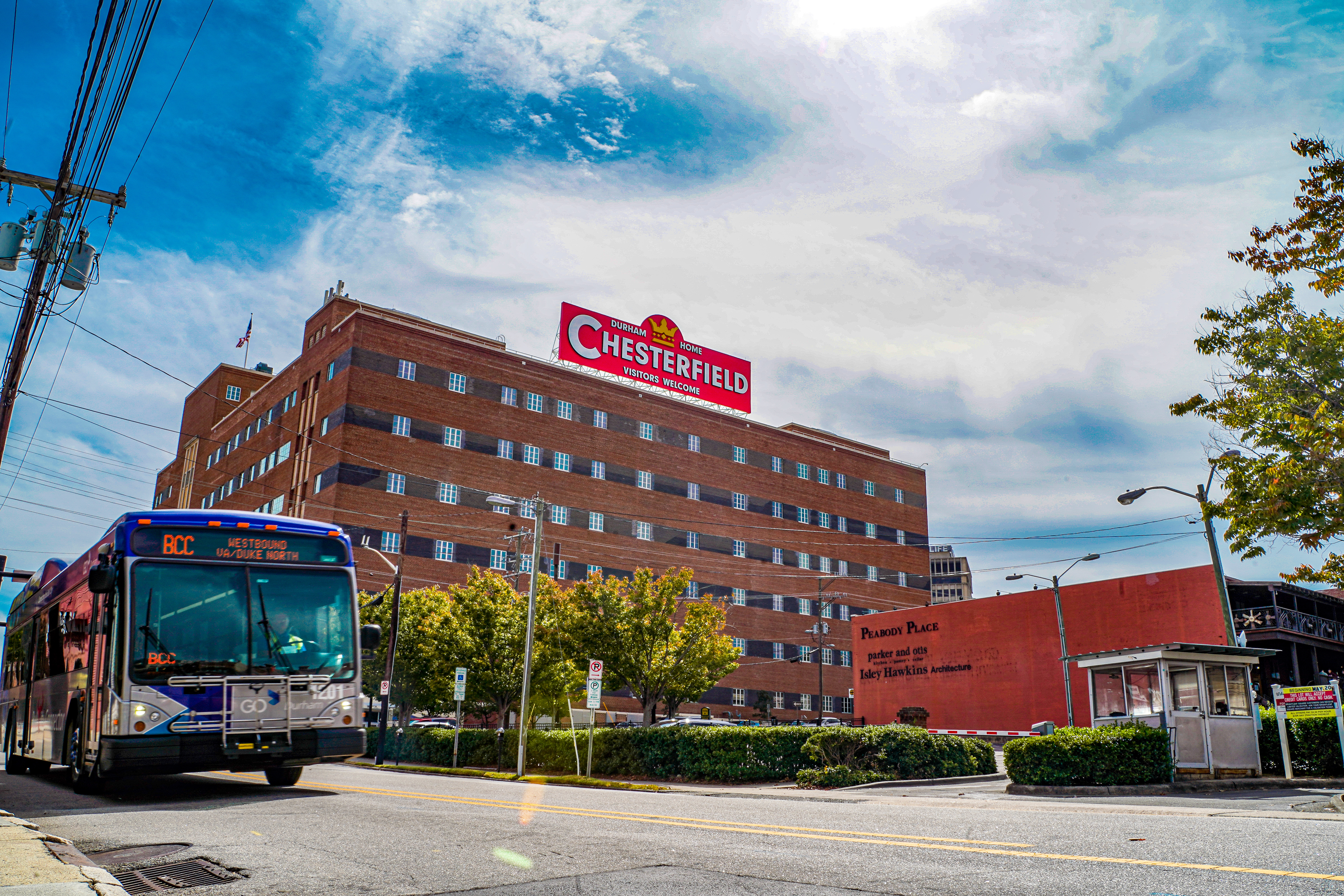
The renovations of former tobacco buildings are central to the revitalization efforts in downtown Durham

In 1970, the Census Bureau reported city's population as 38.8% black and 60.8% white. Durham's growth began to rekindle during the 1970s and 1980s, with the construction of multiple housing developments in the southern part of the city, nearest Research Triangle Park, and the beginnings of downtown revitalization. In 1975, the St. Joseph's Historical Foundation at the Hayti Heritage Center was incorporated to "preserve the heritage of the old Hayti community, and to promote the understanding of and appreciation for the African American experience and African Americans' contributions to world culture."

In 1987, the American Tobacco Factory in Durham closed, leading to an economic downturn and a decline in the city's reputation. A new downtown baseball stadium was constructed for the Durham Bulls in 1994. The Durham Performing Arts Center now ranks in the top ten in theater ticket sales in the US according to Pollstar magazine. Many famous people have performed there including B.B. King and Willie Nelson. After the departure of the tobacco industry, large-scale renovations of the historic factories into offices, condominiums, and restaurants began to reshape downtown. While these efforts continue, the large majority of Durham's residential and retail growth since 1990 has been along the I-40 corridor in southern Durham County.

Major employers in Durham are Duke University and Duke Medical Center (39,000 employees, 14,000 students), about 2 miles (3.2 km) west of the original downtown area, and companies in the Research Triangle Park (49,000 employees), about 10 miles (16 km) southeast. These centers are connected by the Durham Freeway (NC 147).

=== Downtown revitalization ===
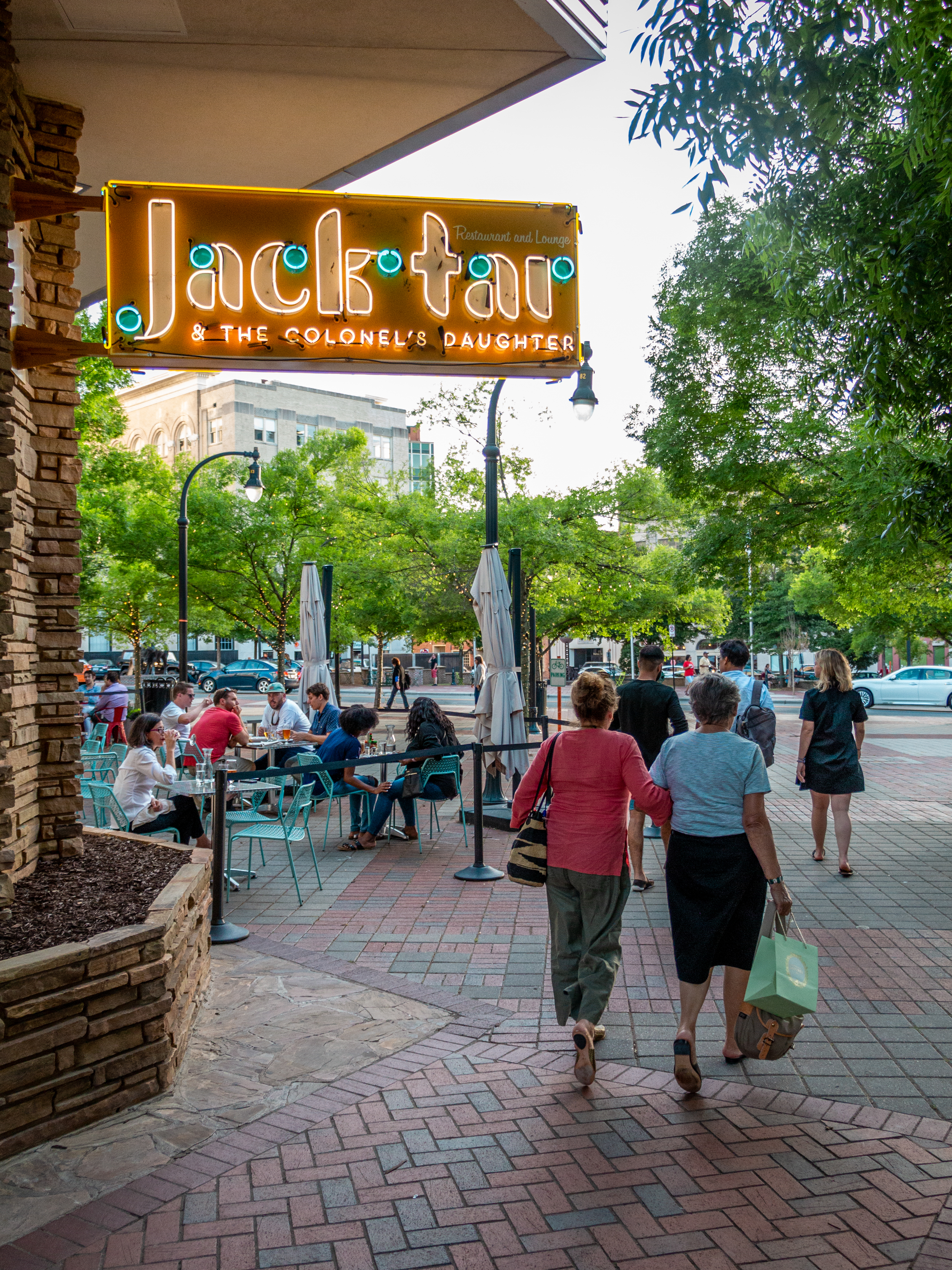
A restaurant in downtown Durham

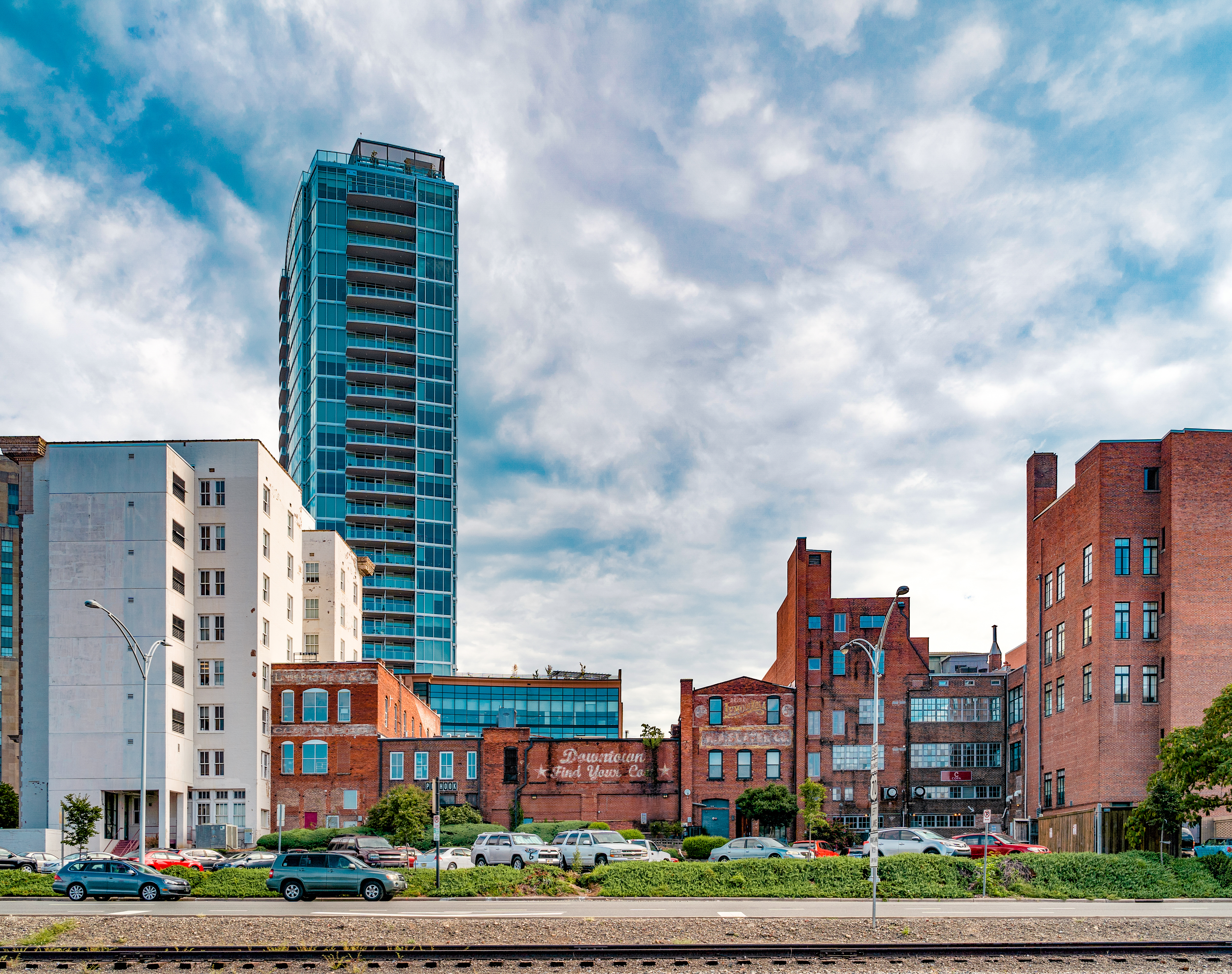
Downtown Durham

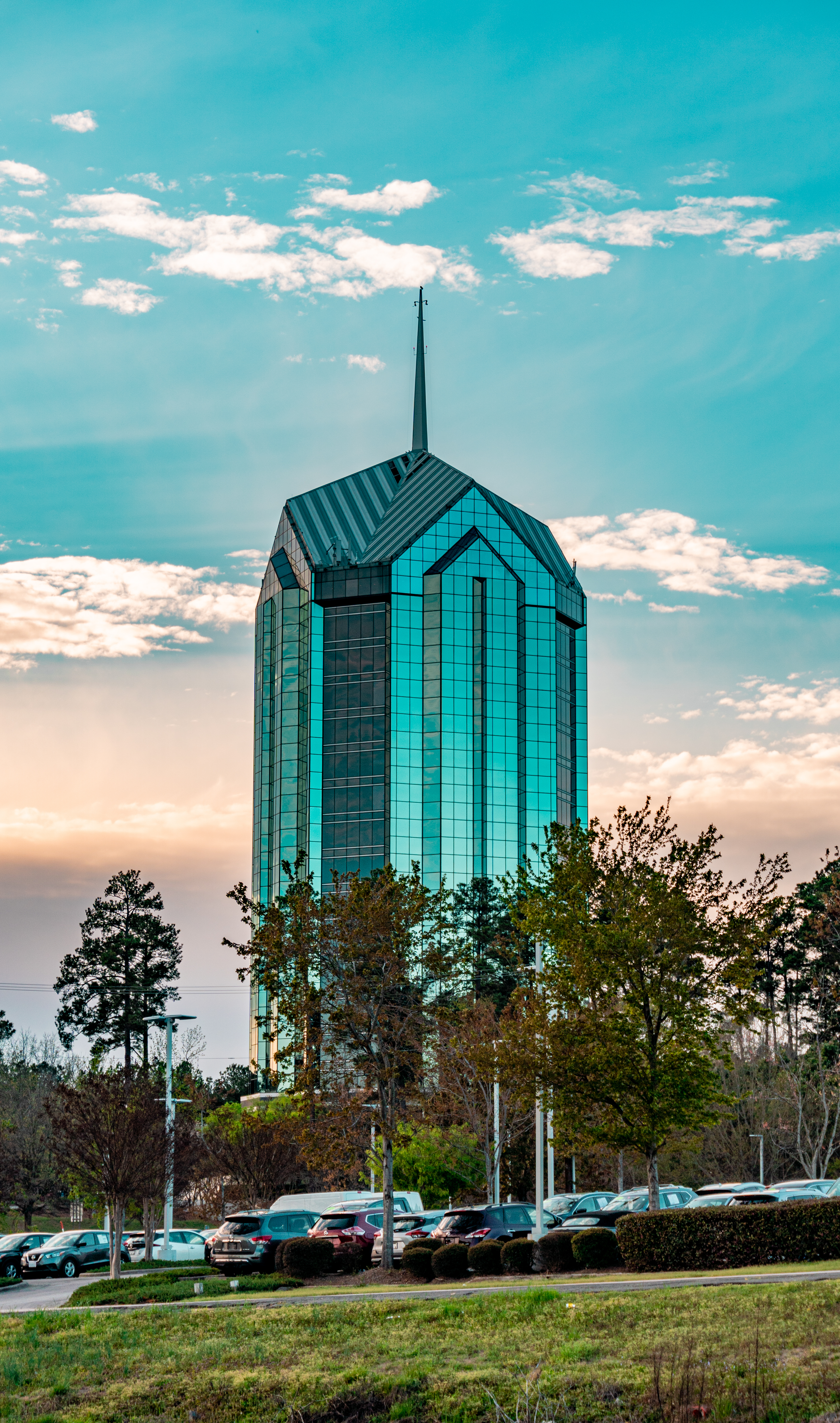
University Tower is the tallest building in Durham located outside of the downtown area.

In recent years the city of Durham has stepped up revitalization of its downtown and undergone an economic and cultural renaissance of sorts. Partnering with developers from around the world, the city continues to promote the redevelopment of many of its former tobacco districts, projects supplemented by the earlier construction of the Durham Performing Arts Center and new Durham Bulls Athletic Park. The American Tobacco Historic District, adjacent to both the athletic park and performing arts center, is one such project, having successfully lured a number of restaurants, entertainment venues, and office space geared toward hi-tech entrepreneurs, investors, and startups. Many other companies have purchased and renovated historic buildings, such as Measurement Incorporated and Capitol Broadcasting Company. The American Underground section of the American Tobacco Campus, home to successful small software firms including Red Hat, was selected by Google to host its launch of the Google Glass Road show in October 2013. The district is also slated for expansion featuring 158,000 square feet of offices, retail, residential or hotel space. The Durham County Justice Center, a major addition to downtown Durham, was completed in early 2013.

Many of the historic tobacco buildings elsewhere in the city have been converted into loft-style apartment complexes. The downtown corridor along West Main St. has seen significant redevelopment including bars, entertainment venues, art studios, and co-working spaces, in addition to shopping and dining in nearby Brightleaf Square, another former tobacco warehouse in the Bright Leaf Historic District. Other current and future projects include expansion of the open-space surrounding the American Tobacco Trail, new hotels and apartment complexes, a $6.35-million facelift of Durham City Hall, and ongoing redevelopment of the Duke University Central Campus.

In 2013, 21c Museum Hotels announced plans to fully renovate the Hill Building. The renovations added a contemporary art museum and upscale restaurant to the historic building. Additionally, a boutique hotel was built in this major renovation effort in downtown Durham. Skanska is responsible for managing this project.

In 2014, it was announced that downtown Durham would be the site of a brand new 27 story high building, tentatively named "City Center Tower," but now called "One City Center". Along with other new buildings in downtown Durham, it was under construction in 2018. It was built on the corner of Main St. and Corcoran St. Upon its completion, it was the tallest building in downtown Durham and the 4th largest building in the Triangle. Originally scheduled for a 2016 opening, the building opening was delayed to May 2018. The building was an $80 million project.

In October 2014, a major new development, the Durham Innovation District, was announced. The development will span 15 acres and comprise over 1.7 million square feet of office, residential, and retail space.

On April 10, 2019, a gas explosion rocked Kaffeinate, a coffee shop in Bright Leaf Historic District. The blast destroyed a city block and killed Kong Lee, the owner, as well as injuring 25 others.

== Geography ==
Durham is located in the east–central part of the Piedmont region at 35°59′19″N 78°54′26″W (35.99, -78.9). Like much of the region, its topography is generally flat with some rolling hills.

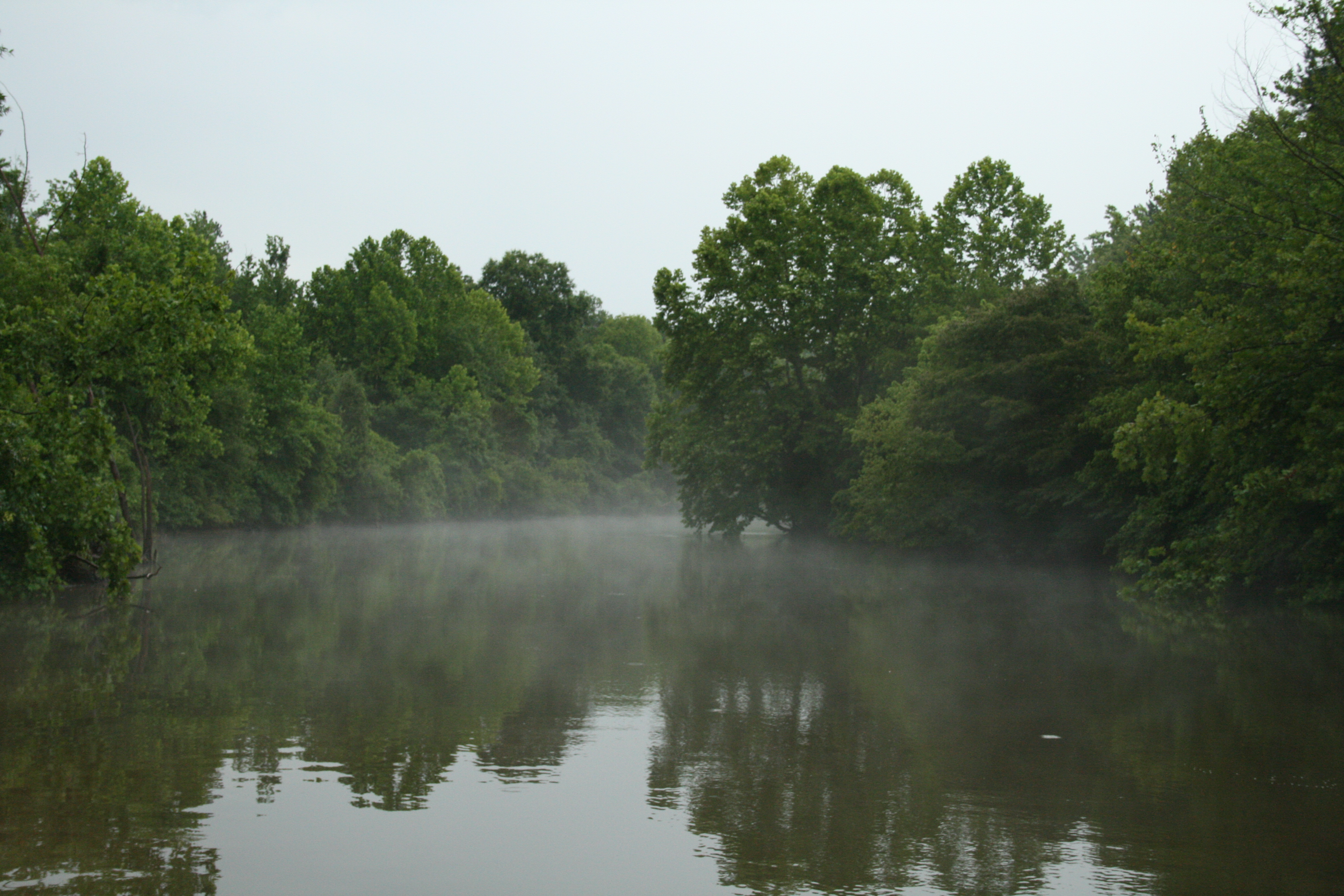
The Eno River flowing through Durham.

As of 2022, the city had a total area of 116.19 square miles (300.9 km^{2}), of which 115.36 square miles (298.8 km^{2}) was land and 0.82 square miles (2.1 km^{2}) (0.71%) was water.

The soil is predominantly clay, making it poor for agriculture. The Eno River, a tributary of the Neuse River, passes through the northern part of Durham, along with several other small creeks. The center of Durham is on a ridge that forms the divide between the Neuse River watershed, flowing east to Pamlico Sound, and the Cape Fear River watershed, flowing south to the Atlantic near Wilmington. A small portion of the city is in Wake County.

Durham is located 16.1 kilometres (10 mi) northeast of Chapel Hill, 34 kilometres (21 miles) northwest of Raleigh, 80 kilometres (50 miles) east of Greensboro, 195 kilometres (121 miles) northeast of Charlotte and 216 kilometres (134 miles) southwest of Richmond, Virginia.

=== Climate ===
The climate of Durham is humid subtropical (Cfa according to the Köppen classification system), with hot and humid summers, cool winters, and warm to mild spring and autumn. Durham receives abundant precipitation, with thunderstorms common in the summer and high temperatures from 27 to 38 °C (81 to 100 °F). The region sees an average of 7 inches (18 cm) of snow per year, with any snowfall usually melting within a few days.

The Durham area consistently ranks in the top 10 most challenging places to live with seasonal allergies out of the top 100 US cities.

Climate change is expected to increase the number of days of extreme precipitation in Durham as well as moderately increase temperature within the region. The number of days of inland flooding within the Piedmont is also expected to increase, which puts Durham at higher risk of future flooding. High-intensity short-duration storms are predicted to grow in frequency to upwards of 9 days a year by 2100. Inland flooding is anticipated to have a greater impact on the elderly and other at-risk groups.

Climate data for Raleigh–Durham International Airport, North Carolina (1991–2020 normals, (Note: Mean monthly maxima and minima (i.e. the expected highest and lowest temperature readings at any point during the year or given month) calculated from data at said location from 1991 to 2020.) extremes 1887–present (Note: Official records for Raleigh kept January 1887 to 17 May 1944 at downtown and at Raleigh–Durham Int'l since 18 May 1944. For more information, see Threadex))
Month	Jan	Feb	Mar	Apr	May	Jun	Jul	Aug	Sep	Oct	Nov	Dec	Year
Record high °F (°C)	80 (27)	84 (29)	94 (34)	95 (35)	99 (37)	105 (41)	105 (41)	105 (41)	104 (40)	100 (38)	88 (31)	81 (27)	105 (41)
Mean maximum °F (°C)	71.9 (22.2)	74.4 (23.6)	81.6 (27.6)	86.4 (30.2)	91.3 (32.9)	96.6 (35.9)	98.2 (36.8)	96.7 (35.9)	92.3 (33.5)	86.7 (30.4)	78.5 (25.8)	72.8 (22.7)	99.6 (37.6)
Mean daily maximum °F (°C)	51.9 (11.1)	55.8 (13.2)	63.3 (17.4)	72.7 (22.6)	80.0 (26.7)	87.4 (30.8)	90.8 (32.7)	88.7 (31.5)	82.5 (28.1)	73.0 (22.8)	63.0 (17.2)	54.7 (12.6)	72.0 (22.2)
Daily mean °F (°C)	41.9 (5.5)	45.0 (7.2)	51.8 (11.0)	60.8 (16.0)	68.8 (20.4)	76.7 (24.8)	80.5 (26.9)	78.8 (26.0)	72.6 (22.6)	61.7 (16.5)	51.5 (10.8)	44.6 (7.0)	61.2 (16.2)
Mean daily minimum °F (°C)	31.8 (−0.1)	34.2 (1.2)	40.3 (4.6)	48.9 (9.4)	57.7 (14.3)	66.0 (18.9)	70.2 (21.2)	68.9 (20.5)	62.7 (17.1)	50.3 (10.2)	40.0 (4.4)	34.4 (1.3)	50.4 (10.2)
Mean minimum °F (°C)	14.0 (−10.0)	19.2 (−7.1)	23.7 (−4.6)	32.2 (0.1)	42.8 (6.0)	54.2 (12.3)	61.0 (16.1)	58.7 (14.8)	48.7 (9.3)	33.2 (0.7)	24.4 (−4.2)	19.9 (−6.7)	12.1 (−11.1)
Record low °F (°C)	−9 (−23)	−2 (−19)	11 (−12)	23 (−5)	29 (−2)	38 (3)	48 (9)	46 (8)	37 (3)	19 (−7)	11 (−12)	0 (−18)	−9 (−23)
Average precipitation inches (mm)	3.43 (87)	2.78 (71)	4.10 (104)	3.53 (90)	3.58 (91)	3.89 (99)	5.02 (128)	4.71 (120)	5.15 (131)	3.37 (86)	3.32 (84)	3.39 (86)	46.07 (1,170)
Average snowfall inches (cm)	2.6 (6.6)	1.4 (3.6)	0.3 (0.76)	0.0 (0.0)	0.0 (0.0)	0.0 (0.0)	0.0 (0.0)	0.0 (0.0)	0.0 (0.0)	0.0 (0.0)	0.1 (0.25)	0.8 (2.0)	5.2 (13)
Average precipitation days (≥ 0.01 in)	10.1	9.3	10.7	9.5	9.9	11.2	11.7	10.7	9.0	7.6	8.2	9.7	117.6
Average snowy days (≥ 0.1 in)	1.2	1.2	0.4	0.0	0.0	0.0	0.0	0.0	0.0	0.0	0.1	0.5	3.4
Average relative humidity (%)	66.5	64.1	63.0	61.7	71.1	73.6	76.0	77.9	77.1	73.3	69.1	68.5	70.2
Average dew point °F (°C)	26.8 (−2.9)	28.2 (−2.1)	35.8 (2.1)	43.3 (6.3)	55.2 (12.9)	63.5 (17.5)	67.8 (19.9)	67.5 (19.7)	61.5 (16.4)	49.3 (9.6)	39.4 (4.1)	31.1 (−0.5)	47.5 (8.6)
Mean monthly sunshine hours	163.8	173.1	228.9	250.7	258.4	267.7	259.5	239.6	217.6	215.4	174.0	157.6	2,606.3
Percentage possible sunshine	53	57	62	64	59	61	58	57	58	62	56	52	59
Average ultraviolet index	3	4	6	7	9	10	10	9	8	5	3	2	6
Source 1: NOAA (relative humidity, dew point, and sun 1961–1990)
Source 2: Weather Atlas (UV Index)

== Demographics ==
Historical population
Census	Pop.	Note	%±
1880	2,041		—
1890	5,485		168.7%
1900	6,679		21.8%
1910	18,241		173.1%
1920	21,719		19.1%
1930	52,037		139.6%
1940	60,195		15.7%
1950	71,311		18.5%
1960	78,302		9.8%
1970	95,438		21.9%
1980	101,149		6.0%
1990	136,611		35.1%
2000	187,035		36.9%
2010	228,330		22.1%
2020	283,506		24.2%
2025 (est.)	305,561	▲	7.8%
U.S. Decennial Census

=== Racial and ethnic composition ===
Durham city, North Carolina – Racial and ethnic composition Note: the U.S. census treats Hispanic/Latino as an ethnic category. This table excludes Latinos from the racial categories and assigns them to a separate category. Hispanics/Latinos may be of any race.
Race / Ethnicity (NH = Non-Hispanic)	Pop 2000	Pop 2010	Pop 2020	% 2000	% 2010	% 2020
White alone (NH)	79,227	86,519	109,401	42.39%	37.89%	38.59%
Black or African American alone (NH)	81,370	92,285	101,422	43.51%	40.42%	35.78%
Native American or Alaska Native alone (NH)	455	611	593	0.24%	0.27%	0.21%
Asian alone (NH)	6,782	11,478	15,917	3.63%	5.03%	5.61%
Pacific Islander alone (NH)	58	129	64	0.03%	0.06%	0.02%
Some Other Race alone (NH)	360	616	1,598	0.19%	0.27%	0.56%
Mixed Race or Multi-Racial (NH)	2,721	4,233	11,021	1.45%	1.85%	3.89%
Hispanic or Latino (any race)	16,012	32,459	43,470	8.56%	14.22%	15.33%
Total	187,035	228,330	283,506	100.00%	100.00%	100.00%

Durham's population, as of July 1, 2019 and according to the 2019 U.S. census data estimate, had grown to 278,993, making it the 50th-fastest-growing city in the US, and the 2nd-fastest-growing city in North Carolina, behind Cary but ahead of Charlotte, Raleigh and Greensboro. As of the 2020 census, there were 283,506 people, 114,726 households, and 64,982 families residing in the city.

As of the 2022 American Community Survey estimates, there were 291,844 people and 124,536 households. The population density was 2,499.6 inhabitants per square mile (965.1/km^{2}). There were 134,423 housing units at an average density of 1,151.3 per square mile (444.5/km^{2}). The racial makeup of the city was 41.1% White, 34.7% Black or African American, 9.9% some other race, 6.7% Asian, and 0.6% Native American or Alaskan Native, with 7.1% from two or more races. Hispanics or Latinos of any race were 14.1% of the population.

Of the 124,536 households, 24.3% had children under the age of 18 living with them, 23.2% had seniors 65 years or older living with them, 36.4% were married couples living together, 8.4% were couples cohabitating, 20.2% had a male householder with no partner present, and 35.1% had a female householder with no partner present. The median household size was 2.26 and the median family size was 3.00.

The age distribution was 19.7% under 18, 12.0% from 18 to 24, 33.2% from 25 to 44, 21.3% from 45 to 64, and 13.8% who were 65 or older. The median age was 35.0 years. For every 100 females, there were 87.4 males.

The median income for a household was $78,105, with family households having a median income of $90,521 and non-family households $60,203. The per capita income was $46,082. Out of the 282,061 people with a determined poverty status, 11.2% were below the poverty line. Further, 17.7% of minors and 7.3% of seniors were below the poverty line.

In the survey, residents self-identified with various ethnic ancestries. People of English descent made up 9.3% of the population of the town, followed by German at 7.7%, Irish at 6.8%, Italian at 3.0%, American at 3.0%, Sub-Saharan African at 2.6%, Polish at 2.0%, Scottish at 1.9%, French at 1.4%, Scotch-Irish at 1.3%, Caribbean (excluding Hispanics) at 0.9%, Dutch at 0.8%, Norwegian at 0.8%, Swedish at 0.8%, Russian at 0.7%, and Welsh at 0.6%.

=== Religion ===
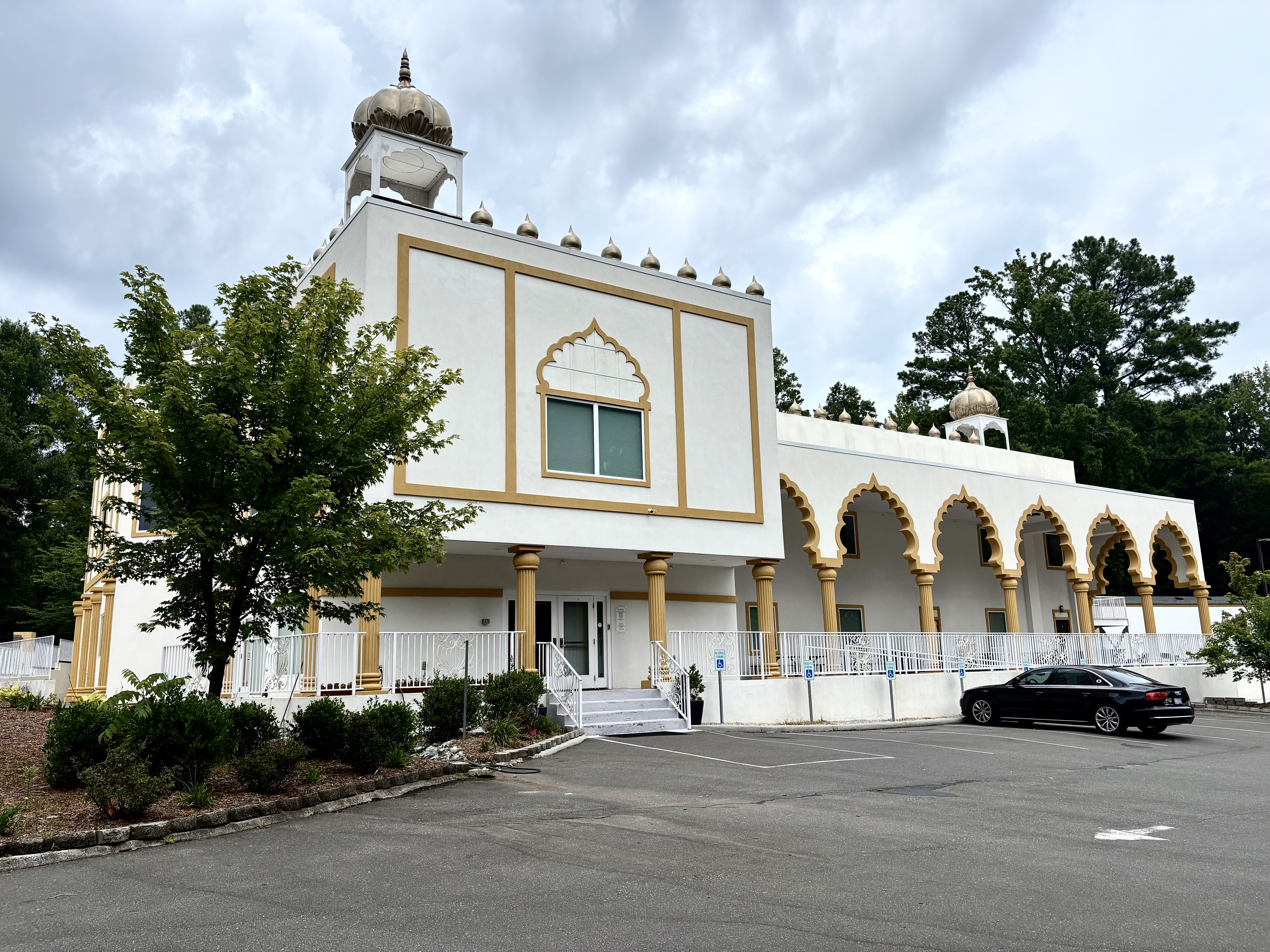
The Sikh Gurudwara of North Carolina in 2025

Durham is home to a wide variety of religious practitioners. The predominant religion in Durham is Christianity, with the largest numbers of adherents being Southern Baptist, Non-denominational Christian, Catholic, United Methodist, Wesleyan, and Presbyterian. Historically there is a significant number of Black Christians in Durham, adhering to Catholicism, Episcopalianism, Pentecostalism, Methodism, and Baptist traditions. The Black Hebrew Israelites also operate an Israelite School of Universal Practical Knowledge campus in Durham. There is a significant Muslim population in Durham. The Ar-Razzaq Islamic Center, established by the Nation of Islam in 1956 in Durham's West End neighborhood, was the first mosque in North Carolina. The city also has smaller Jewish, Buddhist, Sikh, Baháʼí, Hindu, and Unitarian Universalist populations.

=== LGBTQ Community ===
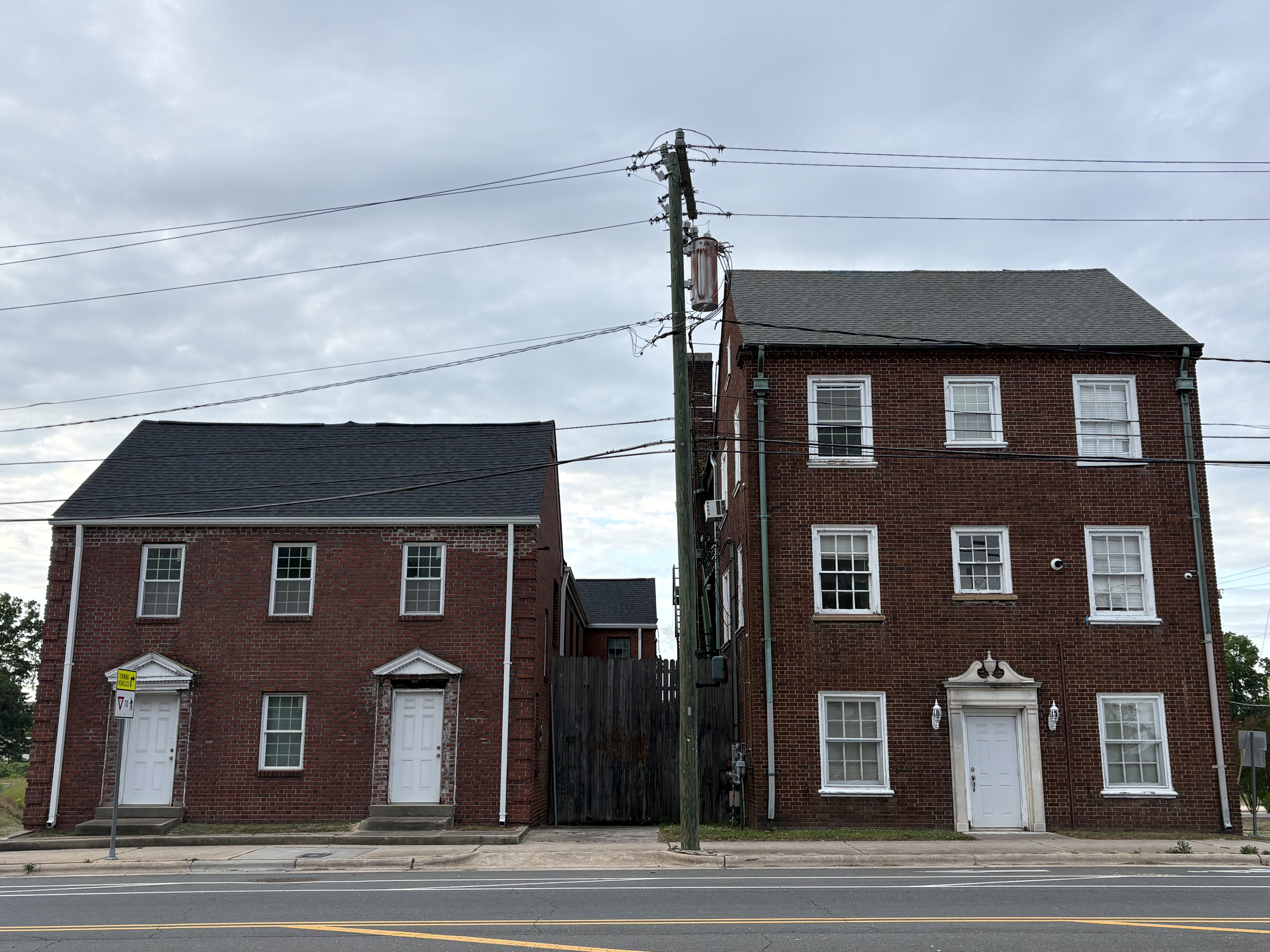
604 W Chapel Hill Street (left) was the home of Feminary, a lesbian feminist newspaper

Durham is known as one of the more socially progressive cities in the Southeastern United States and has a large LGBTQ community. City-wide LGBTQ pride celebrations occur biannually, during Pride Month in June and again in September. The September pride celebrations are in place due to the city's extreme hot weather in the early summer and to allow organizers more time to plan for the events and so that students at local colleges and universities will be in town for the celebrations. Durham also hosts OUTSOUTH Queer Film Festival, the second largest LGBTQ film festival in the American Southeast. Arcana Bar and Lounge, a bar in downtown Durham, is the only officially-recognized lesbian bar in North Carolina according to the Lesbian Bar Project. Other LGBTQ establishments in Durham have included Boxer's Ringside, PickleBack 2, and The Pinhook. Blueberry Hill, likely the city's first gay bar, operated out of the former Blair House Restaurant in the 1970s off of NC 15-501. In 1979, the owner of Blueberry Hill, Bruce Derbin, opened another gay bar at 315 West Main Street in downtown Durham, which was called 42nd Street and renamed Power Company in 1983.

Multiple openly queer politicians have served in city government, including Vernetta Alston, Chelsea Cook, and Jillian Johnson.

In the 1970s, the lesbian feminist publication Feminary (originally titled The Feminist Newsletter) was published out of 604 West Chapel Hill Street. The paper was revived in 1973 by Nancy Blood, Elizabeth Knolten, Leslie Brogan, and Leslie Kahn. From 1978 onward it was published by Minnie Bruce Pratt, Cris South, Susan Ballinger, and Mab Segrest.

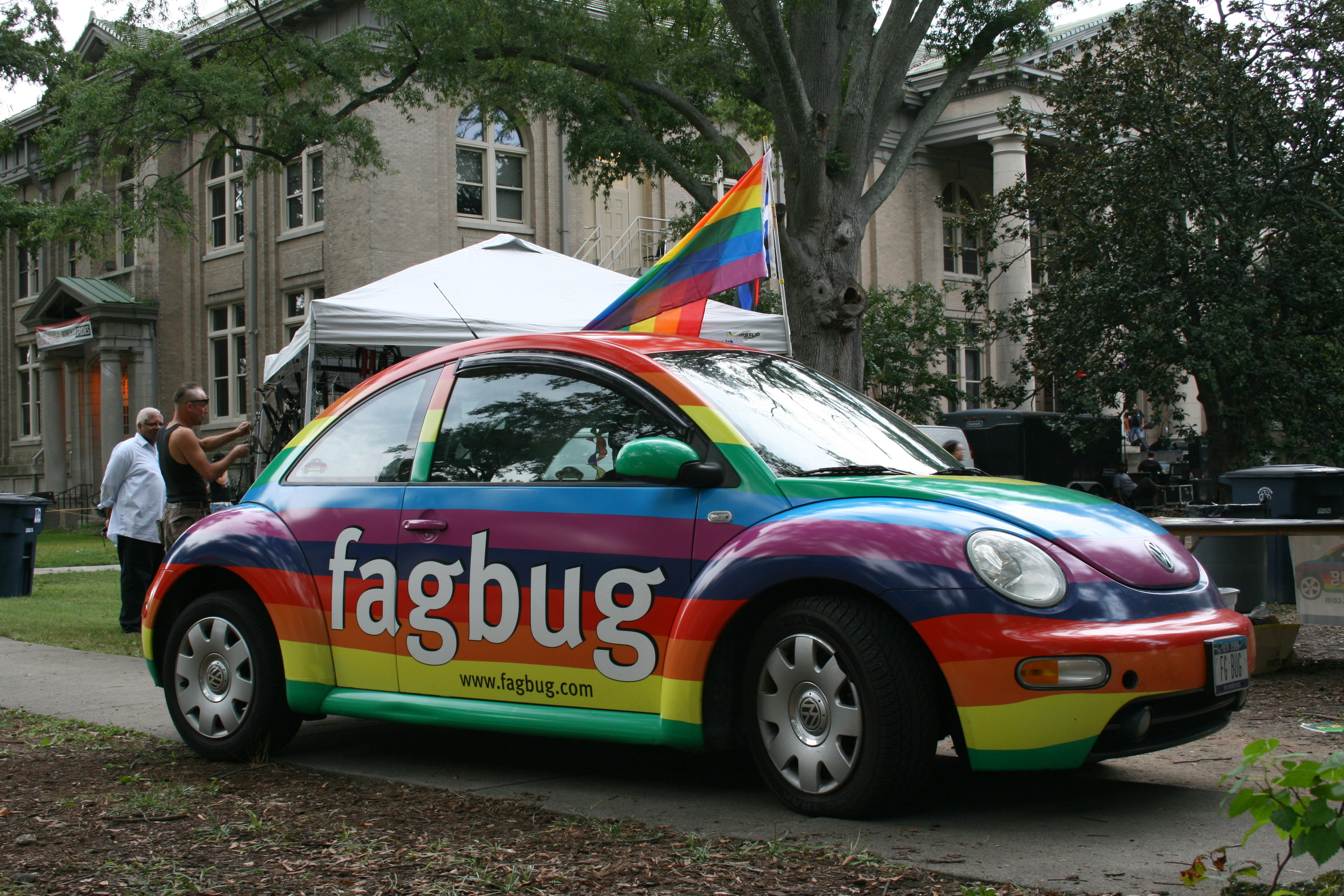
The "fagbug" on Duke University's East Campus in 2008

In the 1970s and early 1980s, the Little River was a popular swimming hole and meeting place for Durham's gay residents. On April 12th, 1981, Chris Lee Richardson and Guy Charles Obsahr targeted four men at the Little River whom they suspected of being gay in what became known as the Little River attacks. They shouted homophobic slurs while beating Jerry "Michael" Penny, Darrel Jones, and Mark Demarias with sticks before clubbing a fourth man, Ronald “Sonny” Kenneth Antonevitch, to death. Antonevitch's murder was a catalyst for the LGBTQ rights movement in North Carolina and led to a protest of 300 people assembling at Durham's Five Points Plaza and marching up Chapel Hill Street, around the Durham County Court House, and back down Main Street on June 27, 1981.

In 1986, Mayor Wib Gulley issued a proclamation designating anti-discrimination week and endorsing the Triangle Gay and Lesbian Pride March in Durham. A coalition, made up of local conservatives and some religious leaders, launched an unsuccessful campaign to recall him. On June 28, 1986, the Triangle Lesbian and Gay Alliance held the first annual pride march in Durham, with the theme "Out Today, Out to Stay." Around 1,000 people marched from Ninth Street to the Durham Reservoir on Hillsborough Road.

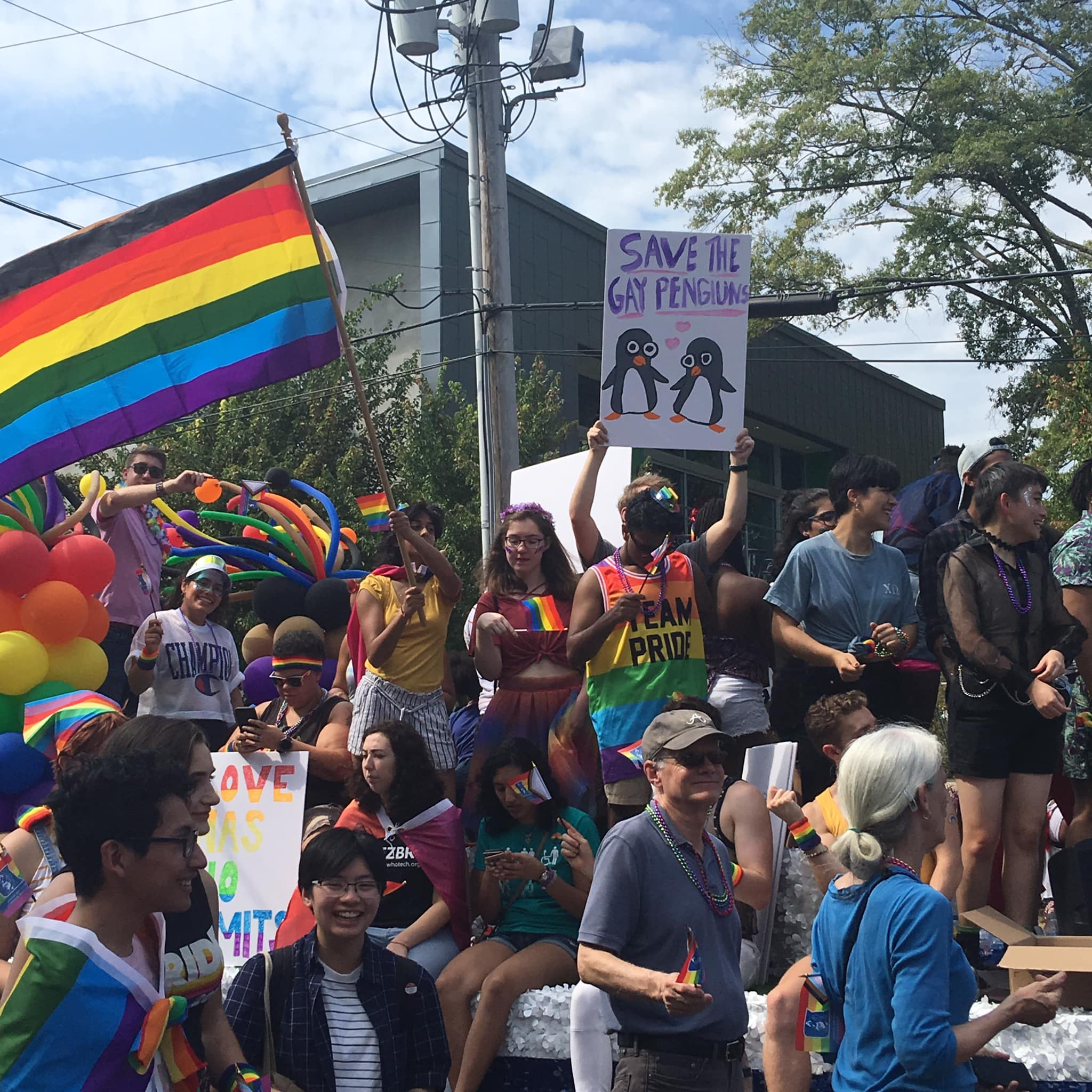
Durham LGBTQ Pride Parade on Broad Street in 2019

The first three businesses that were lesbian-owned in Durham were Ladyslipper Music, Travis Place, and Francesca’s Dessert Caffé.

In 1994, Janice "Jaye" Vaughn founded Cedar Chest, an organization for lesbian women of color after a queer Black men's group, Umoja, would not admit women.

On February 17, 2004, Sean Owen was murdered at the Eno River by men he connected with on gay.com.

In 2015, the LGBTQ Center of Durham was established.

In 2024, local drag queen Naomi Dix opened the LGBTQ nightclub Club Era at the Durham Fruit and Produce Company.

Village Hearth, a retirement community and one of the first co-housing developments exclusively for LGBTQ people in the United States, opened in northern Durham in 2019.

== Economy ==
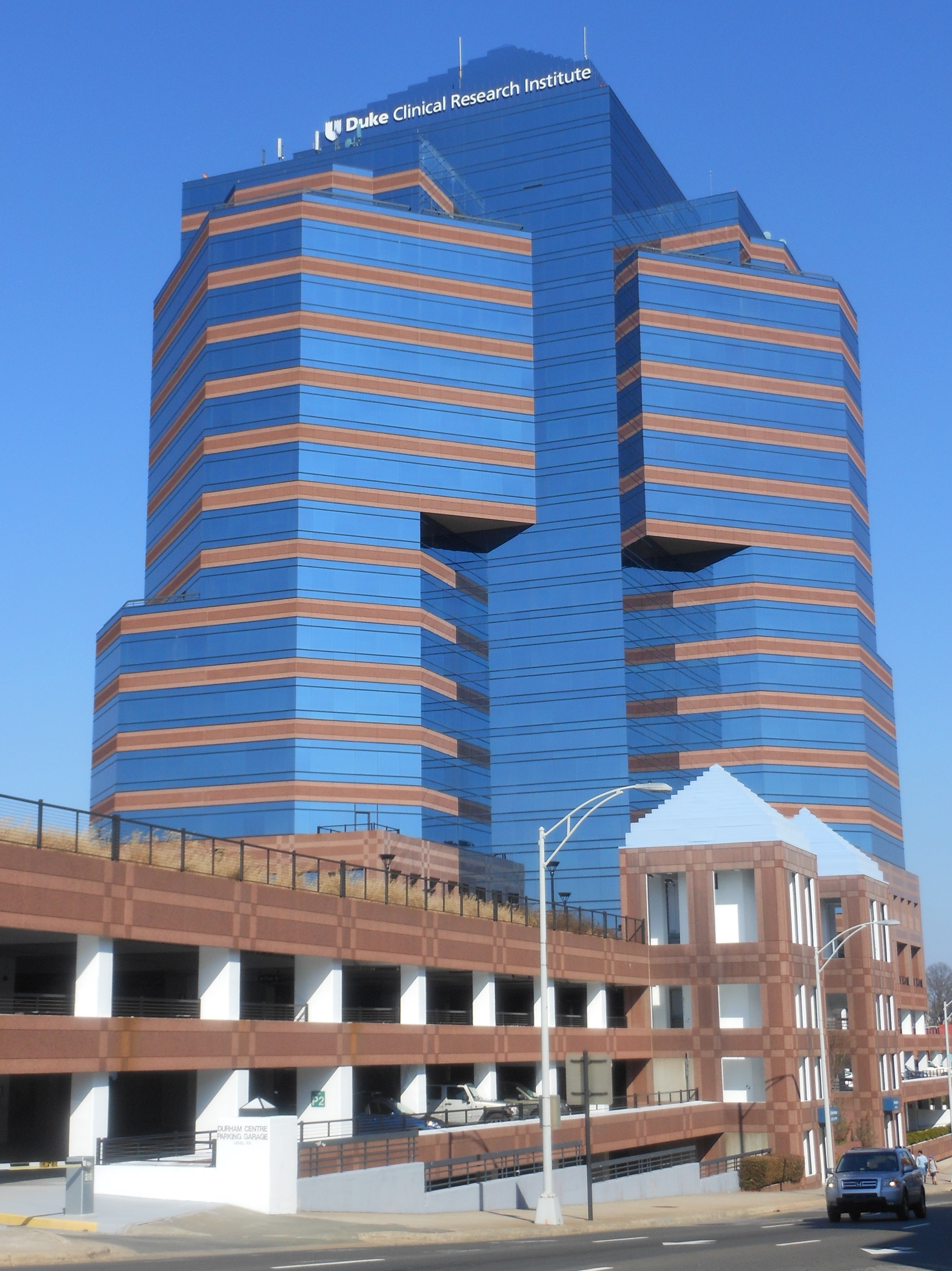
Duke Clinical Research Institute in Downtown Durham

Duke University and Duke University Health System are Durham's largest employers.

== Arts and culture ==
=== Museums & historic sites ===
- Bennett Place
- Duke Homestead
- Hayti Heritage Centre
- Museum of Durham History
- Museum of Life and Science
- Nasher Museum of Art at Duke University
- NCCU Art Museum
- West Point Mill

=== Performing arts ===
- American Dance Festival
- Carolina Theatre
- Durham Arts Council Building
- Durham Performing Arts Center
- Durham Symphony Guild

=== Festivals & events ===
Durham is the venue for the annual Bull Durham Blues Festival and the OUTsouth Queer Film Festival, the 2nd largest LGBTQ+ film festival in the Southeast. Other events include jazz festivals, plays, symphony concerts, art exhibitions, and a multitude of cultural expositions, including the American Dance Festival, Tobacco Road Dance, the Full Frame Documentary Film Festival and the Better Cities Film Festival.

=== Film & television series ===
Movies including Bull Durham (1988) and The Handmaid's Tale (1989) have been shot in Durham.

=== Music ===
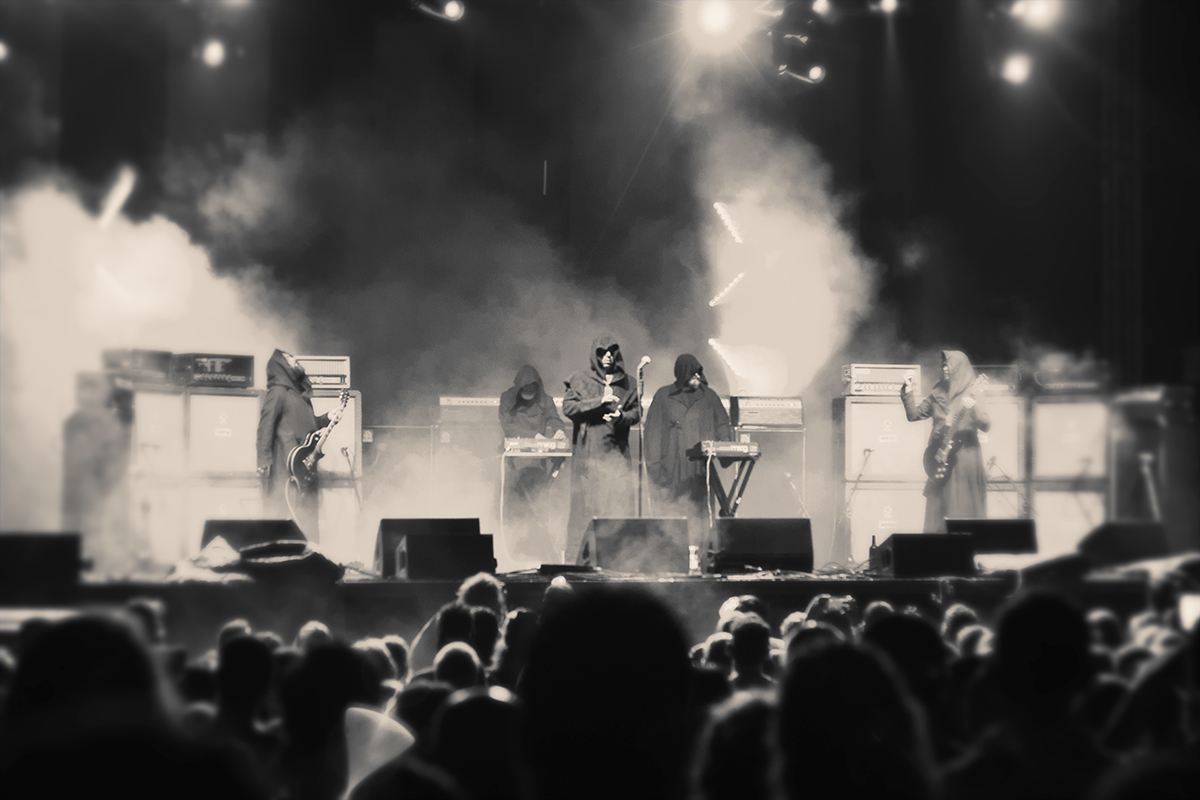
Sunn O))) performing at Moogfest in Durham in 2016

Durham has an active and diverse local music culture. Artists' styles range from jazz, hip-hop, soul, folk, Americana, blues, bluegrass, punk, metal and rock. Popular bands and musicians include Branford Marsalis, Iron & Wine, Carolina Chocolate Drops, The Mountain Goats, John Dee Holeman, 9th Wonder, Red Clay Ramblers, The Old Ceremony, Megafaun, Anne-Claire Niver, Curtis Eller, Mount Moriah, Hiss Golden Messenger, Sylvan Esso, Mel Melton, Hammer No More the Fingers, Yahzarah, G Yamazawa, and Jim Mills. Members of The Butchies, Superchunk, Chatham County Line, Alice Donut, and the Avett Brothers live in Durham.

Merge Records, a successful independent record label, has its headquarters in downtown Durham. Other independent record labels include Jamla, 307 Knox, Churchkey Records, and Paradise of Bachelors. Roots label Sugar Hill Records was founded in Durham, by Barry Lyle Poss, before it moved to Nashville in 1998. In 1996, the feminist / queer record label Mr. Lady Records was founded and operated in Durham until its demise in 2004. Durham's music venues include The Pinhook, The Fruit, the Durham Performing Arts Center, and Motorco Music Hall.

Duke University's radio station WXDU is an active participant in the community. WNCU, which is supported in part by NPR, is a jazz focused FM radio station, with broadcast studios on the campus of NCCU.

The music album Sandham: Symphony Meets Classical Tamil by composer Raleigh Rajan Somasundaram made in association with Academy nominated singer Bombay Jayashri and Durham Symphony (led by William Henry Curry) became Amazon's Top#10 bestseller under 'International Music album' category in 2020.

Durham has a rich history of African American rhythm and blues, soul, and funk music. In the 1960s and 1970s, more than 40 R&B, soul, and funk groups—including The Modulations, The Black Experience Band, The Communicators, and Duralcha—recorded over 30 singles and three full-length albums. Durham was also home to ten recording labels that released soul music, though most of them only released one or two records apiece. A few successful local soul groups from Durham also recorded on national labels like United Artists or on regional labels in the mid-Atlantic and Northeast.

Since 1980, the Eno River Festival has been held annually at the West Point on the Eno park in Durham, hosting a wide variety of musical acts.

=== Visual arts ===
Durham is home to the Nasher Museum of Art and a 21c Museum Hotel.

The Durham Art Walk is an annual arts festival held in May in downtown Durham with artists showing their work in the streets of Durham. A secondary magnet school, Durham School of the Arts in downtown Durham, teaches visual and performing arts.

== Sports ==
A Duke basketball game at Cameron Indoor Stadium

Collegiate athletics are a primary focus in Durham. Duke University's men's basketball team draws a large following, selling out every home game at Cameron Indoor Stadium since 1990. The fans are known as the Cameron Crazies and are known nationwide for their chants and rowdiness. The team has won the NCAA Division I championship three times since 2001 and five times overall. Duke competes in a total of 27 sports in the Atlantic Coast Conference.

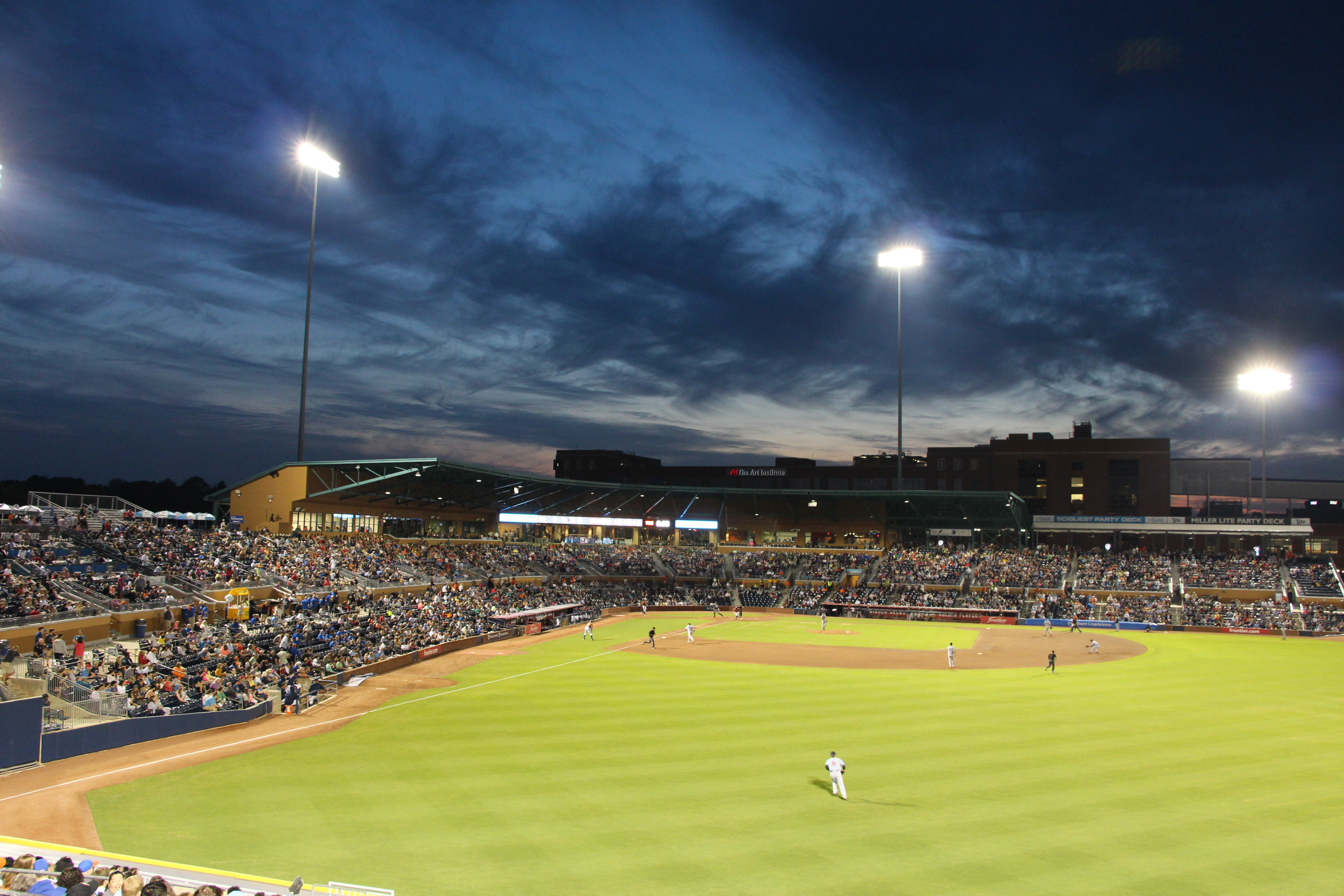
Durham Bulls Athletic Park

Durham's professional sports team is the Durham Bulls International League baseball team. A movie involving an earlier Carolina League team of that name, Bull Durham, was produced in 1988. Today's Bulls play in the Durham Bulls Athletic Park, on the southern end of downtown, constructed in 1994. One of the more successful teams in the minor leagues, the Bulls usually generate an annual attendance of around 500,000. Previously Durham Athletic Park (DAP), located on the northern end of downtown, had served as the Bull's ballpark. Historically, many players for the current and former Durham Bulls teams have transferred to the big leagues after several years in the minor leagues. DAP has been preserved for the use of other teams as well as for concerts sponsored by the City of Durham and other events. The Durham Dragons, a women's fast pitch softball team, played in the Durham Athletic Park from 1998 to 2000. The DAP recently went through a $5 million renovation.

== Government and politics ==
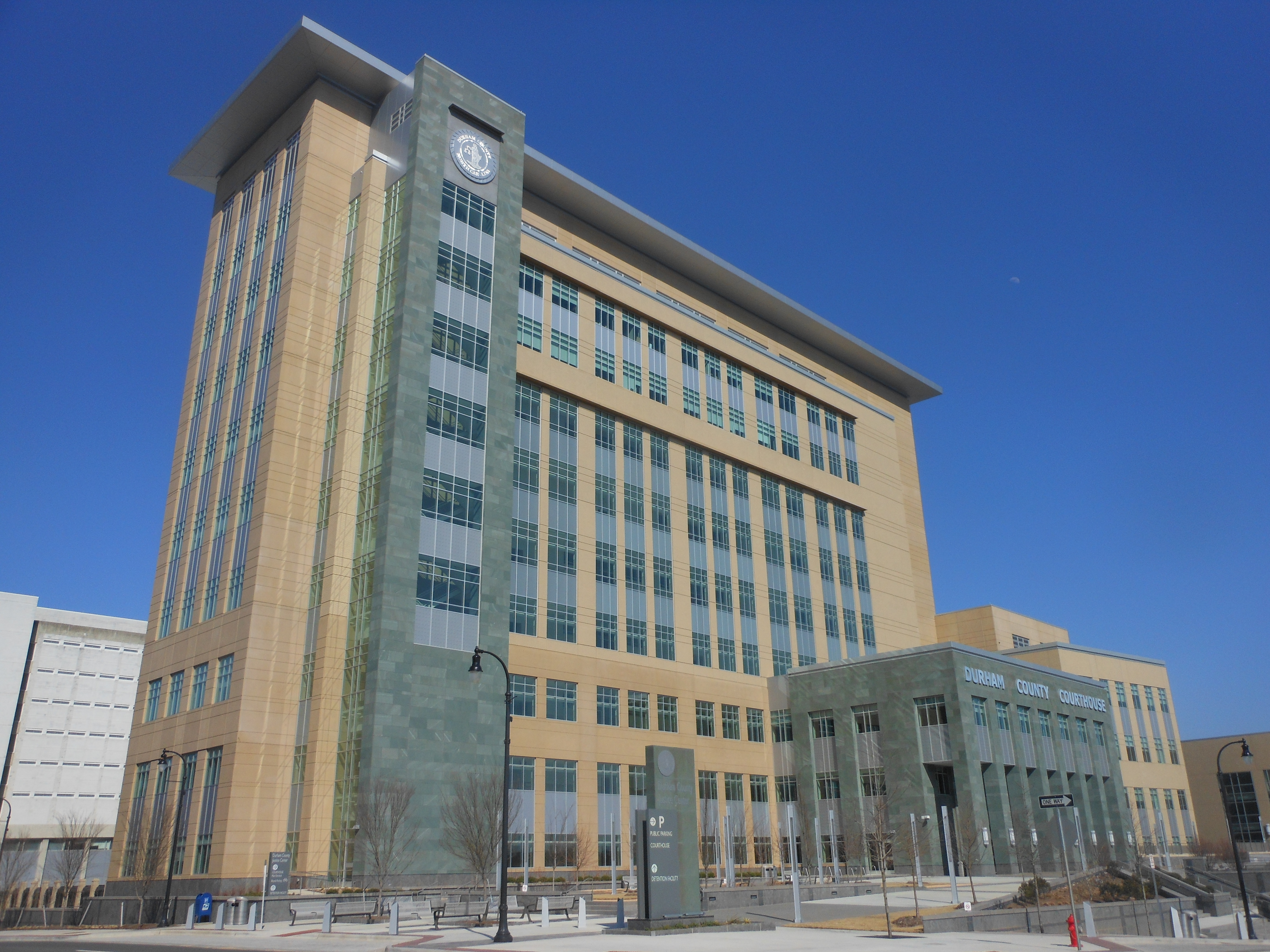
Durham County Justice Center

=== Government ===
Durham operates under a council–manager form of government. The city is led by a city council and a mayor. Council members are chosen in staggered elections to serve four year terms, while mayoral elections are held every two years. The mayor presides over meetings of the city council and makes some committee appointments, while much of the regular management of the city's administration falls to the city manager. In November 2021, Elaine O'Neal was elected mayor of Durham, becoming the first black female mayor in the city. The current mayor is Leonardo Williams, who was elected in November 2023.

Federally, Durham is in North Carolina's 4th congressional district, which is represented by Democrat Valerie Foushee.

The new Durham County Justice Center was completed in early 2013.

=== Politics ===
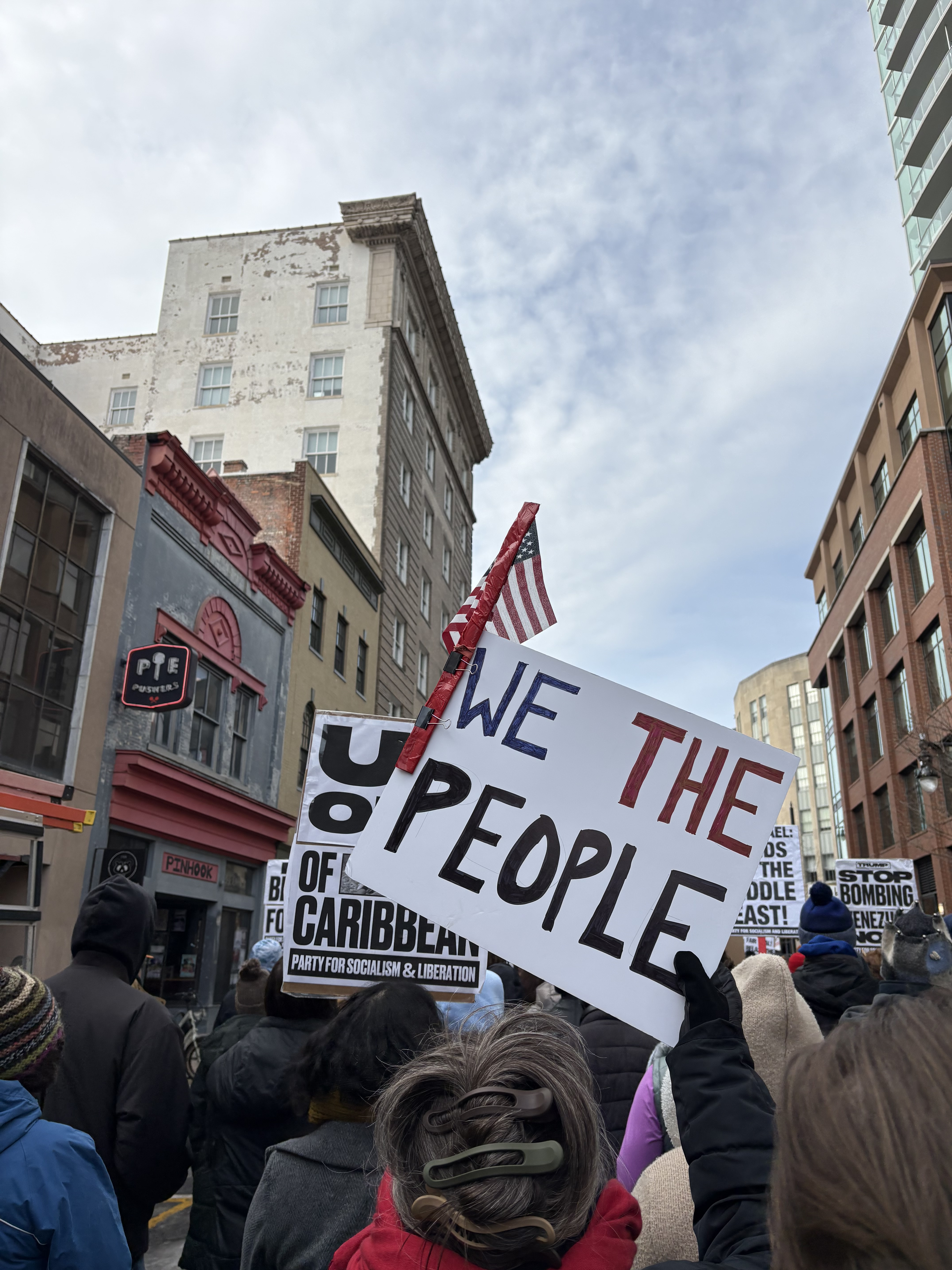
Anti-ICE protest organized by the Party for Socialism and Liberation in Durham as part of the 2026 United States general strike.

The area is predominantly Democratic, and has voted for the Democratic Party's presidential candidate in every election since the city's founding in 1869. Durham County is the most liberal-leaning county in North Carolina, with over 80% of the county voting for Democratic candidate Joe Biden in the 2020 presidential election. The city's politics have long been dominated by the activities of two local political action committees, the People's Alliance (PA) and the Durham Committee on the Affairs of Black People (DCABP). PA is a mostly-white progressive organization, while the DCABP is a black moderate group.

Key political issues have been the redevelopment of Downtown Durham and revival of other historic neighborhoods and commercial districts, ending cash bail, ending mandatory sentencing minimums, decriminalization of marijuana, raising minimum wage for city employees to $15, the fluoridation of public drinking water, a 45% reduction of crime, a 10-year plan to end homelessness, initiatives to reduce truancy, and growth and development. A merger of Durham City Schools (several inner city neighborhoods) and Durham County Schools in the early 1990s ignited controversy. More recently, the Durham City Council's 2018 statement opposing militarized policing that mentioned Israel has drawn its third lawsuit. In 2018, Durham appointed its first Latino council member Javiera Caballero. In 2023, Durham elected Nate Baker to the city council, its first candidate endorsed by the Triangle chapter of the Democratic Socialists of America.

== Education ==
=== Primary and secondary schools ===
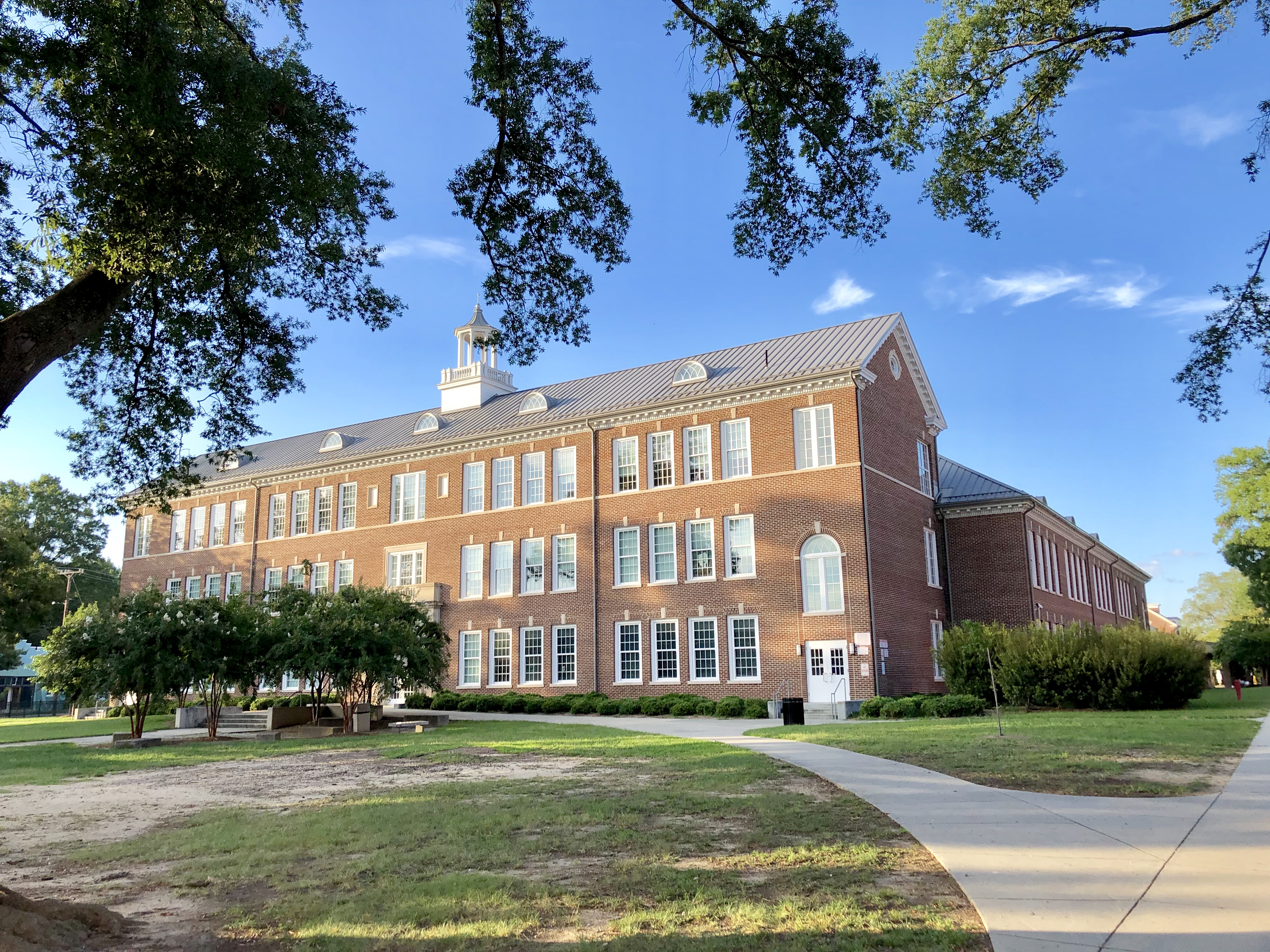
Durham School of the Arts

Public schools in Durham are run by the Durham Public Schools, the eighth-largest school district in North Carolina. The district runs 46 public schools, consisting of 30 elementary, 10 middle, 2 secondary, and 12 high schools. Several magnet high schools focus on distinct subject areas, such as the Durham School of the Arts and the City of Medicine Academy. Public schools in Durham were partially segregated until 1970.

The North Carolina School for Science and Mathematics is a boarding high school operated by the University of North Carolina System in central Durham. The residential school accepts rising juniors living in North Carolina, with a focus on science, mathematics, and technology.

There are several charter school options as well, including Research Triangle High School (a STEM school in Research Triangle Park), Voyager Academy (K–12), Kestrel Heights School (K–12), Maureen Joy Charter School (K–8), and most recently Excelsior Classical Academy (K–12).

Several private schools operate in Durham, such as Durham Academy, Triangle Day School, and The Duke School. There are also religious schools, including Carolina Friends School, Trinity School of Durham and Chapel Hill, Cristo Rey Research Triangle High School, Immaculata Catholic School, and Durham Nativity School.

=== Colleges and universities ===
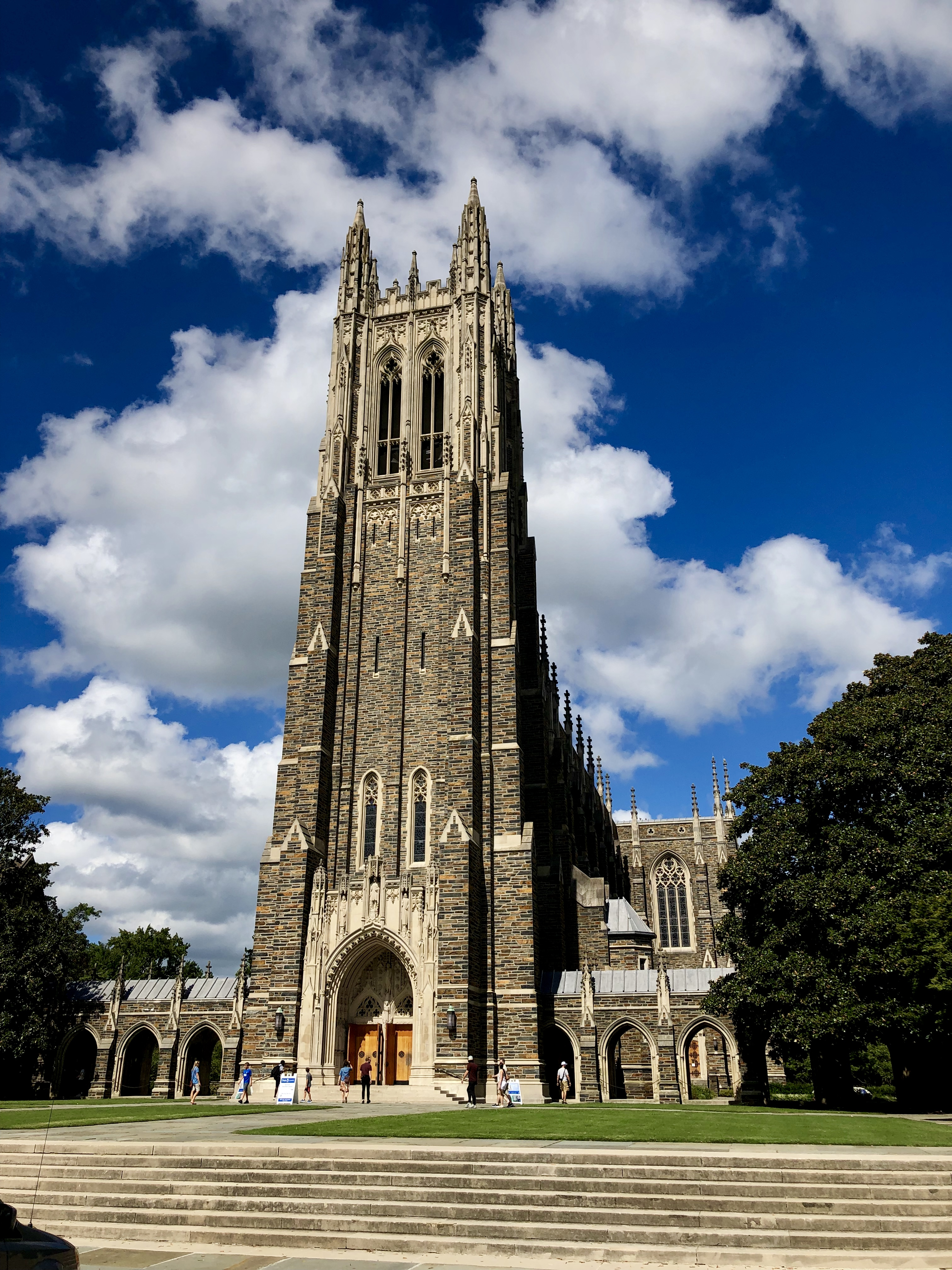
Duke Chapel at Duke University.

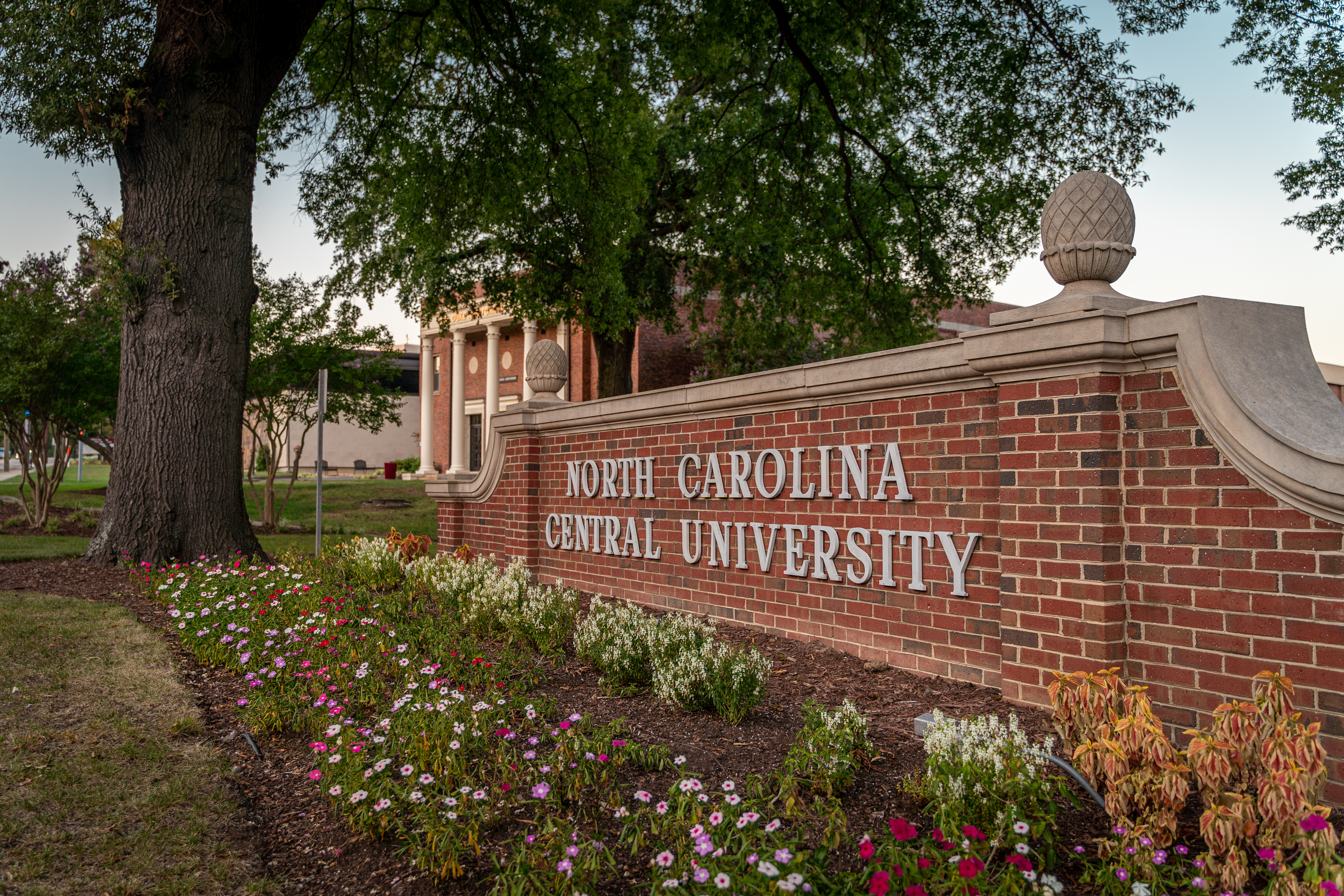
North Carolina Central University

Duke University has approximately 14,000 students, split evenly between graduates and undergraduates. Duke's 8600-acre campus and Medical Center are located in western Durham, about 2 miles (3.2 km) from downtown. Duke forms one of the three vertices of the Research Triangle, along with the University of North Carolina at Chapel Hill and North Carolina State University.

North Carolina Central University is a public historically black university located in southeastern Durham. The university was founded by James E. Shepard in 1910 as the National Religious Training School and Chautauqua to address the needs of the region's black population, and now grants baccalaureate, master's, professional and doctoral degrees. NCCU became a university in 1969 and joined the University of North Carolina System in 1972.

Durham Technical Community College is a two-year public institution that grants associate degrees.

== Media ==
The major daily newspaper in Durham is The Herald-Sun, which began publication in 1893. The Durham-based Independent Weekly, noted for its progressive/liberal perspective, provides political and entertainment news for the greater Research Triangle; it began publication in 1983. The Triangle Tribune, a weekly newspaper focused on the African-American community, began publication in 1998. Duke's independent student newspaper, The Chronicle, also provides local coverage.

Durham is part of the Raleigh–Durham–Fayetteville designated market area, the 24th-largest broadcast television market in the United States. ABC-owned and -operated WTVD is licensed to and based in Durham, while the studios for statewide public television service UNC-TV are based in Research Triangle Park. All major U.S. television networks have affiliates serving the region.

The city is part of the Raleigh–Durham Arbitron radio market, ranked No. 37 nationally. National Public Radio affiliate WUNC, based in Chapel Hill, has had significant broadcast operations at the American Tobacco Historic District since October 2005.

== Infrastructure ==
=== Transportation ===
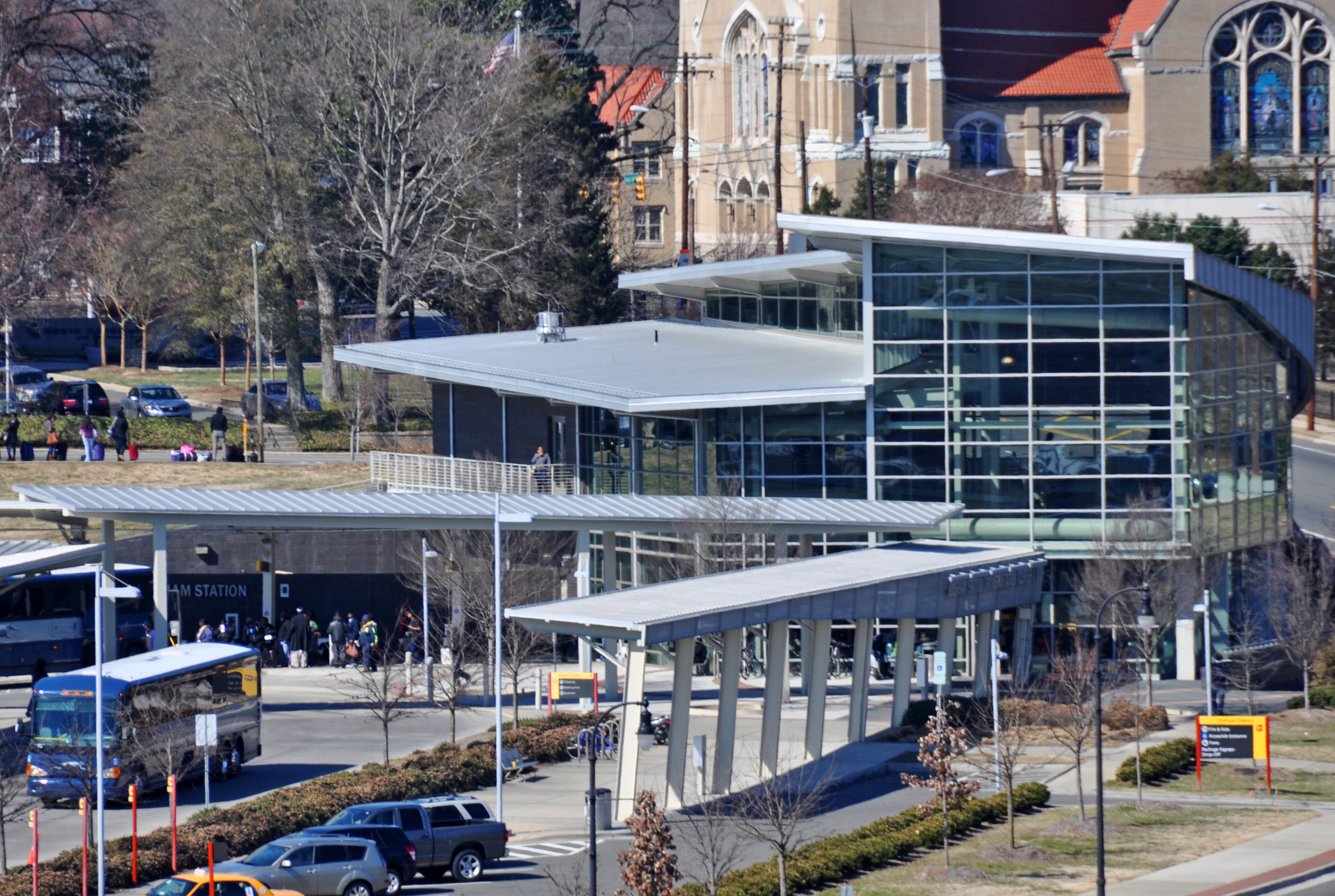
Downtown Durham Station used by GoDurham and GoTriangle

==== Freeways and primary routes ====
Most travel in Durham is by private motor vehicle on its network of public streets and highways. Important arteries for traffic include NC 147, which connects Duke University, downtown, and Research Triangle Park, U.S. 15-501 between Durham and Chapel Hill, I-85, connecting Durham to Virginia and western North Carolina cities, and I-40 running across southern Durham County between the Research Triangle Park and Chapel Hill. The I-40 corridor has been the main site of commercial and residential development in Durham since its opening in the early 1990s. Over 95% of commuters use a car to get to work, with 14% of those people in carpools.

==== Bicycling ====
Durham maintains an extensive network of bicycle routes and trails and has been recognized with a Bicycle Friendly Community Award. The American Tobacco Trail begins in downtown and continues south through Research Triangle Park and ends in Wake County. The city is also considering furthering the progress on the Triangle Greenway System.

==== Air ====
Air travel is provided by Raleigh–Durham International Airport, 12 miles southeast of Durham, which enplanes about 4.5 million passengers per year. Frequent service (five flights a day or more) is available to Boston, Charlotte, Philadelphia, New York LaGuardia, New York Kennedy, Newark, Washington Reagan, Washington Dulles, Chicago O'Hare, Dallas, Houston, and Atlanta, GA. Non-stop daily service is provided to approximately 30 destinations in the United States and daily international service is also available to London Heathrow, Toronto-Pearson and Paris Charles de Gaulle.

==== Intercity rail ====
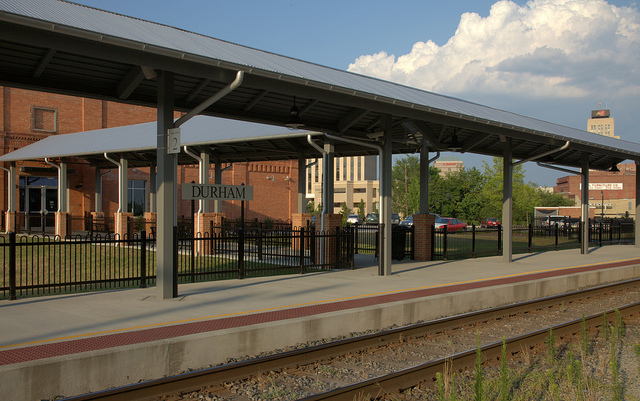
Durham's Amtrak station

Amtrak operates the daily Carolinian train between Charlotte and New York City, which stops in downtown Durham. The State of North Carolina, in cooperation with Amtrak, operates four additional daily Piedmont trains between Raleigh and Charlotte which also stop in Durham. A new Amtrak station was built in 2011 in a former tobacco warehouse. Some of the downtown streets cross the tracks at grade level, while other intersections have grade separation. One downtown railroad underpass has attracted national media coverage because it provided only 11 feet 8 inches of clearance, damaging the roofs of many trucks. On October 26, 2019, the underpass was temporarily closed to both automotive and train traffic so that the track could be raised to improve the railway grade in that location and increase the clearance underneath to 12 feet 4 inches. Nonetheless, a few accidents still occur.

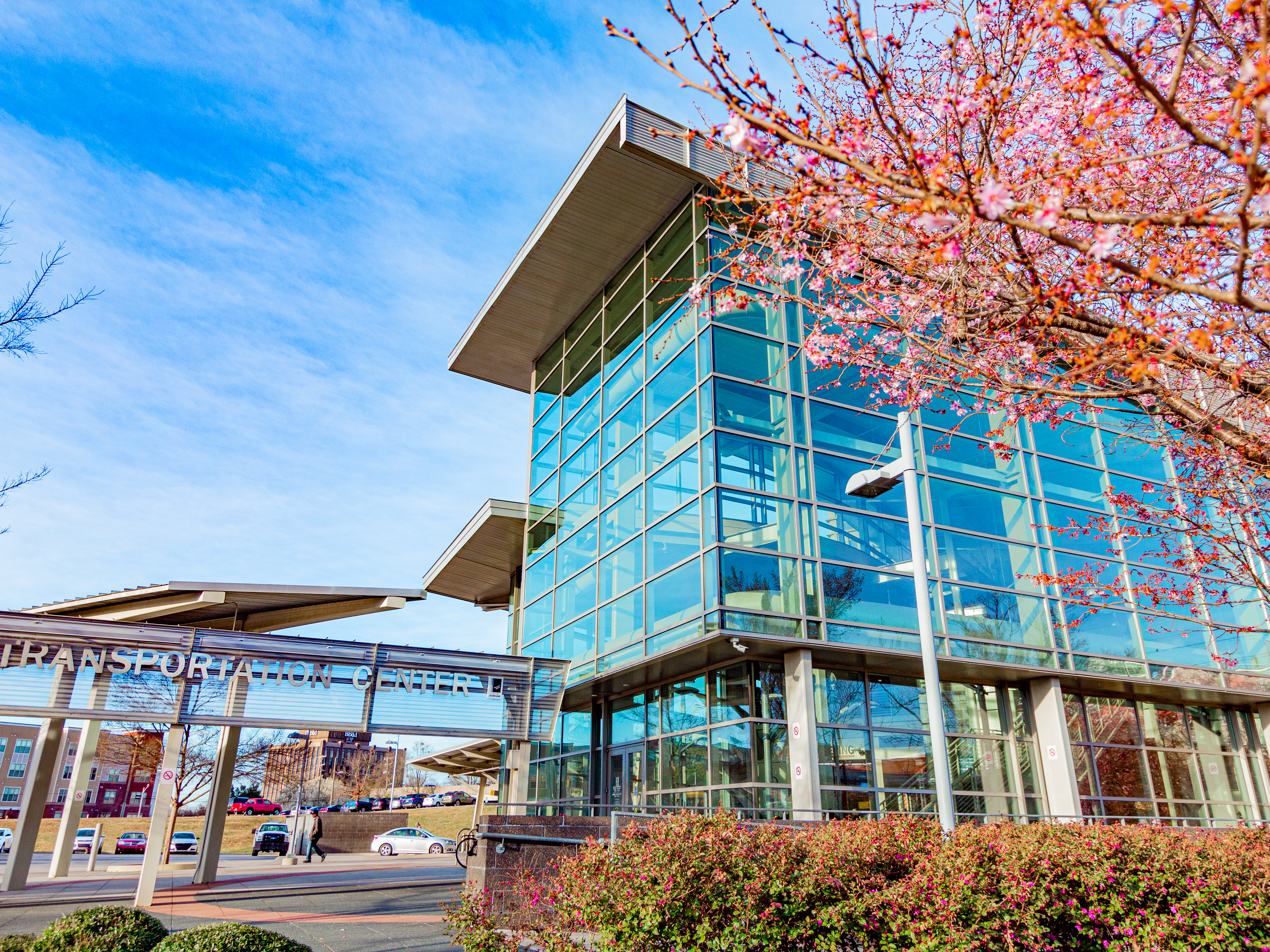
Durham Station Transportation Center

==== Public transit ====
GoDurham provides municipal bus service on 21 routes serving the immediate Durham area. GoDurham's route network follows a hub-and-spoke model centered on the Durham Station Transportation Center, which opened in 2009 in downtown Durham. In 2025, GoDurham had an annual ridership of 6,741,500.

GoTriangle offers scheduled, fixed-route regional and commuter bus service between Durham and the region's other principal cities of Raleigh, Cary and Chapel Hill, as well as to and from the Raleigh–Durham International Airport, Research Triangle Park and several of the region's larger suburban communities. GoTriangle also coordinates an extensive vanpool and rideshare program that serves the region's larger employers and commute destinations.

National bus service is provided by Greyhound and Megabus at the Durham Station Transportation Center since its opening in 2009.

Duke University maintains its own transit system, Duke Transit, which operates more than 30 buses on seven routes throughout the campus and health system.

From 1995, the cornerstone of GoTriangle's long-term plan was a 28-mile (45 km) rail corridor from northeast Raleigh, through downtown Raleigh, Cary, and Research Triangle Park, to Durham using DMU technology. There were proposals to extend this corridor 7 miles (11 km) to Chapel Hill with light rail technology. However, in 2006 Triangle Transit deferred implementation indefinitely when the Federal Transit Administration declined to fund the program. Government agencies throughout the Raleigh–Durham metropolitan area have struggled to determine the best means of providing fixed-rail transit service for the region. The project was cancelled 2019 with costs more than $157 million.

The region's two metropolitan planning organizations appointed a group of local citizens in 2007 to reexamine options for future transit development in light of Triangle Transit's problems. The Special Transit Advisory Commission (STAC) retained many of the provisions of Triangle Transit's original plan, but recommended adding new bus services and raising additional revenues by adding a new local half-cent sales tax to fund the project.

==== Transportation safety ====
To help create safer roadways for vehicles, bicyclists, and pedestrians, drivers can enroll in Durham's Pace Car Program, agreeing to drive the speed limit, stop at all stop signs, stop at all red lights, and stop to let pedestrians cross the street.

== Notable people ==
- Kate Lee Harris Adams, aviator and member of the Women Airforce Service Pilots during World War II
- Blind Boy Fuller (Fulton Allen), musician
- Louis Austin (1898–1971), journalist, civil rights leader
- Ernie Barnes, artist/painter
- Kara Medoff Barnett, theater producer, arts director
- Samuel Beam, singer/songwriter from Iron & Wine, current resident
- Ben Brantley, The New York Times theater critic
- Joseph Penn Breedlove, first Duke University librarian
- Andrew Britton, novelist
- Mic'hael Brooks, NFL player
- Little Brother, hip-hop group
- Kelly Bruno, world-record–holding amputee runner and athlete; contestant on reality TV show Survivor: Nicaragua
- Dan Bryk, singer, rock star
- Shirley Caesar, pastor and gospel recording artist
- George Watts Carr, architect
- Carolina Chocolate Drops, folk band who cite their hometown as Durham
- Anthony Roth Costanzo, countertenor known for his performance as the title role of the opera Akhnaten (opera)
- Crystal Cox, track and field athlete; member of national team for the 2004 Athens Summer Olympics; contestant on reality TV show Survivor: Gabon
- Roger Lee Craig, Major League Baseball pitcher and manager
- John Darnielle, musician and novelist best known as the primary (and often solitary) member of the American band the Mountain Goats, for which he is the writer, composer, guitarist, pianist, and vocalist
- Betty Davis, funk and soul singer
- Reverend Gary Davis, musician
- The Duffer Brothers, creators of the Netflix series Stranger Things
- Benjamin Newton Duke, tobacco, textile, and energy industrialist and philanthropist
- James Buchanan Duke, industrialist, founder of The Duke Endowment and Duke University
- Tempest DuJour, drag performer and professor, known for competing on RuPaul's Drag Race season 7
- Victor Dzau, scientist and academic
- Sylvan Esso, grammy-nominated dance and electronic music duo
- Rapsody (Marlanna Evans), Grammy-nominated female rapper
- Pura Fé, Native American singer
- Rick Ferrell, Major League Baseball catcher; member of the National Baseball Hall of Fame
- John Wesley Fletcher, pastor
- Tate Fogleman, NASCAR driver
- Nnenna Freelon, jazz singer/composer
- Philip Freelon (1953–2019), architect, designer of the National Museum of African American History and Culture
- Penny Fuller, award-winning actress in numerous Broadway, film, and television productions
- Julian Gamble (born 1989), basketball player in the Israeli Basketball Premier League
- David Garrard, NFL quarterback from 2002 to 2013
- David Gergen, advisor to presidents Ford, Reagan, and Clinton
- Heather Gordon (born 1967), artist
- Lisa Grabarek, teacher and Baptist preacher
- John H. Hager, former Virginia lieutenant governor (1998–2002) and the father-in-law of former First Daughter Jenna Bush Hager
- Mary Katharine Ham, Conservative journalist; grew up in Durham
- Michael Hardt, philosopher and theorist of globalization, politics and culture
- Jay Huff, professional basketball player for the Indiana Pacers
- Brandon Hargest, singer for Jump5
- Brittany Hargest, singer for Jump5
- Heather Havrilesky, author, essayist, and humorist raised in Durham
- Biff Henderson, Late Show with David Letterman comedian and television personality
- Wilbur Hobby, labor leader and former president of the North Carolina AFL-CIO
- Alexander Isley, designer and educator
- Fredric Jameson, literary critic and Marxist political theorist
- Big Daddy Kane, hip-hop artist and actor
- John P. Kee, pastor and gospel recording artist
- Stuart Krohn (born 1962), professional rugby union player
- Mike Krzyzewski, former head coach of the Duke men's basketball team and former head coach of Team USA
- Patrick Kypson, professional tennis player
- Mur Lafferty, podcaster and writer
- James G. Leyburn, sociologist, professor, author
- Caitlin Linney, singer/songwriter
- John D. Loudermilk, songwriter ("Tobacco Road", "Then You Can Tell Me Goodbye")
- John Lucas II, NBA player and coach
- David Lynch, film and TV director; lived in Durham as a child; parents met at Duke University
- John Malachi, jazz pianist
- Crystal Mangum, accuser in the 2006 Duke lacrosse case, who was later found guilty of fatally stabbing her boyfriend
- Leo Mangum, Major League Baseball pitcher
- John H. Manning, lawyer, officer and Adjutant General of North Carolina
- Pigmeat Markham, comic actor and novelty musician
- Doug Marlette, Pulitzer Prize-winning cartoonist; lived in Durham as a child
- Branford Marsalis, resident of Durham for several years. The Branford Marsalis Quartet's 2006 album Braggtown was titled after Braggtown Baptist Church, located in northeastern Durham, just north of Highways 70/85.
- Frank Matthews, drug trafficker during the late 1960s and early 1970s
- Tracy McGrady, attended Mount Zion Christian Academy his senior year, NBA player
- Clyde McPhatter, singer/songwriter, founding member of The Drifters
- LeRoi Moore of the Dave Matthews Band, contemporary jazz musician
- Anita Morris, actress (Ruthless People, The Hotel New Hampshire, nominated for a Tony for her work in Nine)
- The Mountain Goats, indie rock band
- Pauli Murray (1910–1985), civil rights and women's activist, attorney, author, poet and priest, lived here as a child with grandparents; in 1977 was the first black woman to be ordained as an Episcopal priest; in 2012 was named as an Episcopal saint (one of its "Holy Women, Holy Men")
- Link Neal, YouTuber with Rhett McLaughlin for the channels Rhett & Link & Good Mythical Morning
- Mike Nifong, Durham County district attorney disbarred in 2006 for actions in Duke University lacrosse case that year
- David Noel, NBA player for the Milwaukee Bucks
- Wye Oak, musical duo composed of Jenn Wasner and Andy Stack
- Ike Opara, Major League Soccer defender for Sporting Kansas City
- Katina Parker, filmmaker and photographer
- Robert Martin Patterson, United States Army soldier and Medal of Honor recipient
- Malik Pinto, soccer player
- Sidney Powell, prosecutor and attorney
- Brian Roberts, Major League Baseball player, second baseman for the Baltimore Orioles
- Leah Roberts, former North Carolina State University student who abruptly left Durham in March 2000 and has remained missing ever since
- Rodney Rogers,(1971–2025) NBA power forward from 1993 to 2005
- Ben Ruffin, civil rights activist, educator, and businessman
- Don Schlitz, songwriter (Kenny Rogers's "The Gambler")
- George Scott (singer) (1929–2005), vocalist for gospel music group The Blind Boys of Alabama
- James E. Shepard (1875–1947), educator, founder and president of North Carolina College for Negroes (now North Carolina Central University)
- Robert K. Steel, former Undersecretary of the Treasury
- Jamie Stewart, art-pop musician best known as the frontman of Xiu Xiu
- Andre Leon Talley (1948–2022), Vogue editor, fashion luminary, and judge on America's Next Top Model
- Grady Tate, American musician and singer
- Justin Tornow, dancer and choreographer
- Emilie Townes, dean of Vanderbilt Divinity School, former president of the American Academy of Religion
- Jeff Tremaine, filmmaker known for Jackass
- Teresa Trull, singer, songwriter, and record producer
- LeRoy T. Walker (1918–2012), former United States Olympic president; former chancellor of North Carolina Central University (NCCU)
- Dewayne Washington, NFL cornerback from 1994 to 2005
- Seth Wescott, Olympic champion snowboarder
- Josh Whitesell, Major League Baseball first baseman of the Arizona Diamondbacks
- T. J. Warren, NBA player for the Indiana Pacers
- Bull City Red (birth name George Washington), blues musician
- George Washington Watts, financier and philanthropist
- Sara Virginia Ecker Watts Morrison, nurse, philanthropist, and First Lady of North Carolina
- Harvey D. Williams (1930–2020), African American U.S. Army major general
- Walter Lee Williams, one of the FBI Ten Most Wanted Fugitives
- Morgan Wootten, head basketball coach at DeMatha Catholic High School and member of the Basketball Hall of Fame
- James B. Wyngaarden, American physician, researcher, and academic administrator
- Freekey Zekey (Ezekiel Giles), rapper; spent almost three years in jail at Durham Correctional Center on drug charges before being released on November 20, 2006

== Sister cities ==
Durham's sister cities are:

- Arusha, Tanzania
- Celaya, Mexico
- Durham, County Durham, England, United Kingdom
- Kavala, Greece
- Sibiu, Romania
- Tilarán, Costa Rica
- Toyama, Japan
- Zhuzhou, China
- Kunshan, China

Following the 2022 Russian invasion of Ukraine, the Durham County council revoked the twinning arrangements with Kostroma, which had been in place since 1968.

== See also ==
- List of municipalities in North Carolina
- Norfolk Southern–Gregson Street Overpass
- Triangle J Council of Governments
- List of U.S. cities with large Black populations
