= Benjamin N. Duke House =

Historic house in Manhattan, New York

- U.S. National Register of Historic Places
- New York City Landmark
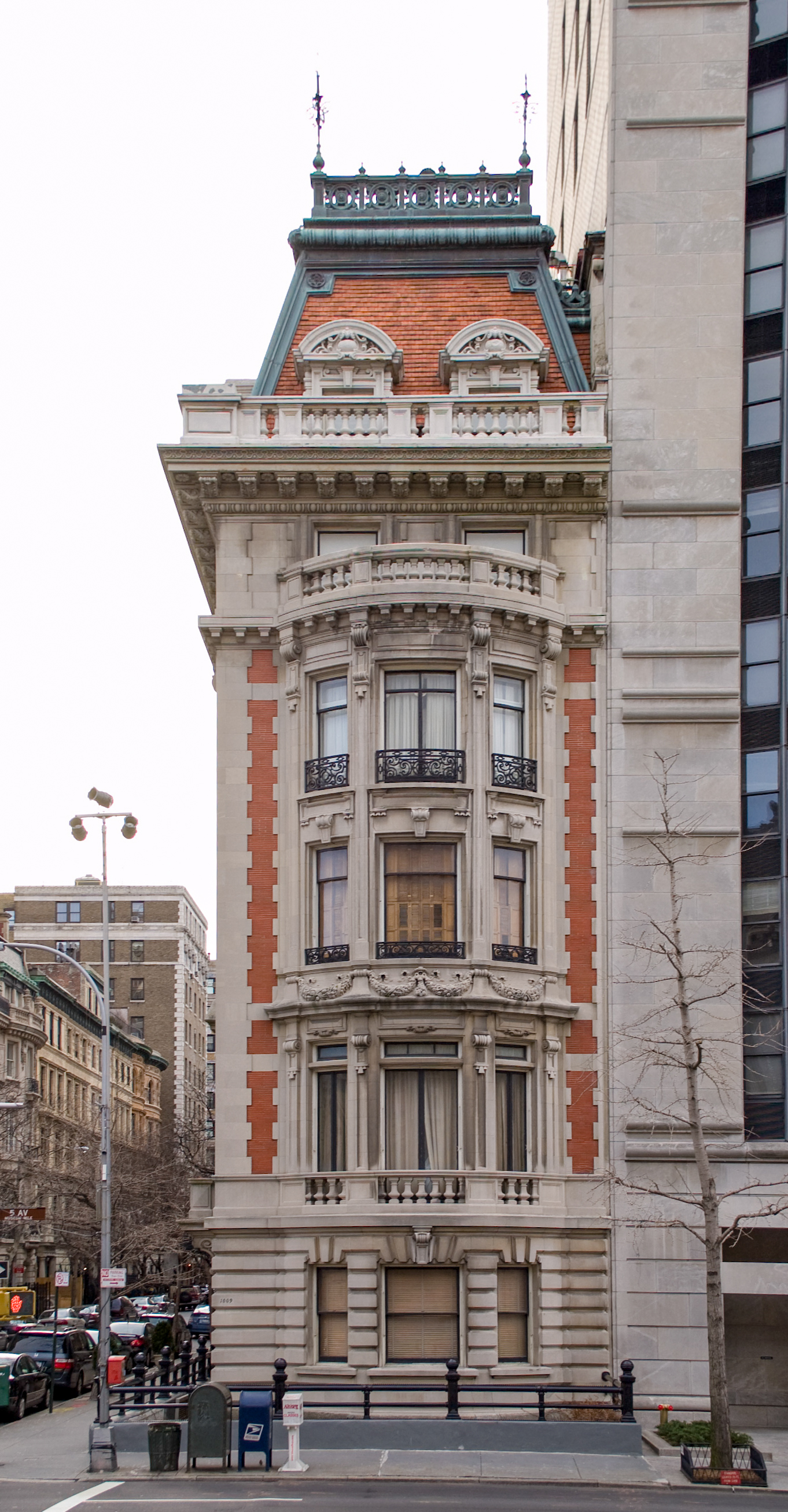
- The mansion in 2010
- Interactive map of Benjamin N. Duke House
- Location: 1009 Fifth Avenue at East 82nd Street; Manhattan, New York City
- Coordinates: 40°46′43.6″N 73°57′43.8″W
- Built: 1899–1901
- Architect: Welch, Smith & Provot
- Architectural style: Beaux-Arts; French Renaissance (interior)
- NRHP reference No.: 89002090
- NYCL No.: 0805

Significant dates
- Added to NRHP: December 7, 1989
- Designated NYCL: February 19, 1974

The Benjamin N. Duke House, also the Duke–Semans Mansion and the Benjamin N. and Sarah Duke House, is a mansion at 1009 Fifth Avenue, at the southeast corner with 82nd Street, on the Upper East Side of Manhattan in New York City. It was built between 1899 and 1901 and was designed by the firm of Welch, Smith & Provot. The house, along with three other mansions on the same block, was built speculatively by developers William W. Hall and Thomas M. Hall. The Benjamin N. Duke House is one of a few remaining private mansions along Fifth Avenue. It is a New York City designated landmark and is listed on the National Register of Historic Places.

The house, located across from the Metropolitan Museum of Art's Fifth Avenue building, consists of seven stories and a basement. The exterior of the house is built in the Beaux-Arts style, while the interior was originally designed in the French Renaissance style. The ground floor is clad in limestone, while the facade of the upper floors is made of brick; the mansion is capped by a copper mansard roof. The facade is divided vertically into six bays on 82nd Street and three bays on Fifth Avenue. The main entrance on 82nd Street leads to a stairway that rises through the building. Originally, the dining room, music room, parlor and kitchen were on the second floor, while the other stories contained bedrooms. The house was divided into three apartments in the 1990s, and it had 12 bedrooms and 14 bathrooms by the 2010s.

American Tobacco Company director Benjamin N. Duke acquired the house in April 1901 and lived there until he moved to a new house at 2 East 89th Street in 1909. Benjamin's brother James lived with his brother and wife for several years and then leased the house from 1909 until he moved to the James B. Duke House at the corner of 78th Street and Fifth Avenue in 1912. The mansion then served as the residence of Benjamin Duke's son Angier Buchanan Duke until 1919, when Angier's sister Mary Lillian Duke and her husband A. J. Drexel Biddle Jr. moved in. After Mary's death in 1960, her daughter Mary Semans took over the house with her family. The building became a city landmark in 1974 after the Semans family refused to sell the building to developers; it was renovated in the 1980s and again in the 1990s. Semans sold the house in 2006 to businessman Tamir Sapir. Mexican telecom magnate Carlos Slim bought the house in 2010 and tried to resell it in 2015 and 2023.

== Site ==
The Benjamin N. Duke House is at 1009 Fifth Avenue on the Upper East Side of Manhattan in New York City. It is on the southeast corner of 82nd Street and Fifth Avenue. The rectangular land lot covers 2,717 ft^{2} (252.4 m^{2}), with a frontage of 27.17 ft (8.28 m) on Fifth Avenue to the west and 100 ft (30 m) on 82nd Street to the north.

Directly to the north, the building is adjacent to a 15-story apartment building at 1010 Fifth Avenue, which was completed in 1925. A townhouse at 2 East 82nd Street abuts the building to the east. To the south are two apartment buildings: 1001 Fifth Avenue, designed by Philip Johnson and John Burgee in 1979, as well as 998 Fifth Avenue, designed by McKim, Mead & White and opened in 1910. The main entrance of the Metropolitan Museum of Art's Fifth Avenue building is directly across Fifth Avenue to the west, adjoining Central Park. Historically, the house was part of Fifth Avenue's "Millionaires' Row", a grouping of mansions owned by some of the United States' wealthiest people.

Historically, the Benjamin N. Duke House was one of four adjacent mansions at 1006 through 1009 Fifth Avenue that were developed by William W. and Thomas M. Hall and completed in 1901. Welch, Smith & Provot was hired to design all four mansions, as well as the adjacent townhouse at 2 East 82nd Street. Among the notable occupants of the other houses was the National Audubon Society, which moved into 1006 Fifth Avenue in 1938. The houses at 1006 and 1007 Fifth Avenue were demolished in 1972 to make way for an apartment building, and the house at 1008 Fifth Avenue was also demolished in 1977.

== Architecture ==
The house was built between 1899 and 1901 to designs by the firm of Welch, Smith & Provot, composed of Alexander M. Welch, Bowen Bancroft Smith, and George Provot. (Note: The 1974 New York City landmark designation report speculates that the design was by Alexander McMillan Welch, who had worked with the Halls before founding the Welch, Smith & Provit firm with Bowen B. Smith and George Provot, but later sources list only the firm as architect.) Welch, Smith & Provot. who worked nearly exclusively for William W. and Thomas M. Hall, designed many buildings on the Upper East Side in the early 20th century. The house was built in the Beaux-Arts style with a French Renaissance interior, decorated mainly with Louis XV style furniture. P. A. Fiebiger created much of the house's metalwork.

=== Facade ===
The main portion of the house rises five stories from the street and is capped by a two-story mansard roof. The 82nd Street elevation of the facade, to the north, is vertically divided into six bays of openings; the facade is further split into a five-bay-wide main section and a one-bay-wide eastern wing. There are three bays of openings on the west, facing Fifth Avenue. Both the Fifth Avenue elevation and the third-westernmost bay on the 82nd Street elevation are curved outward in a manner resembling the Baroque style.

The house is separated from either street by a recessed areaway, which is delineated by a cast iron railing along the sidewalk. The basement and first floor are clad with rusticated blocks of limestone. The facade of the upper floors is made of brick, with limestone quoins at each corner, as well as large pieces of limestone trim. The roof is clad with red tile and is topped by copper cresting; metal finials extend from the top of the roof. The mansard roof may have been influenced by the Beaux-Arts style; the house is designed with further elements of the Beaux-Arts style, including cartouches on the facade and wrought-iron window guards. The copper cresting on the roof, which was mass-produced when the house was built, had to be replaced with a custom-made replica in the 1980s. The modern-day house has six metal finials, each weighing 250 lb (110 kg) and measuring 9 ft (2.7 m) tall. There are also two outdoor terraces, including one on the roof.

==== 82nd Street ====
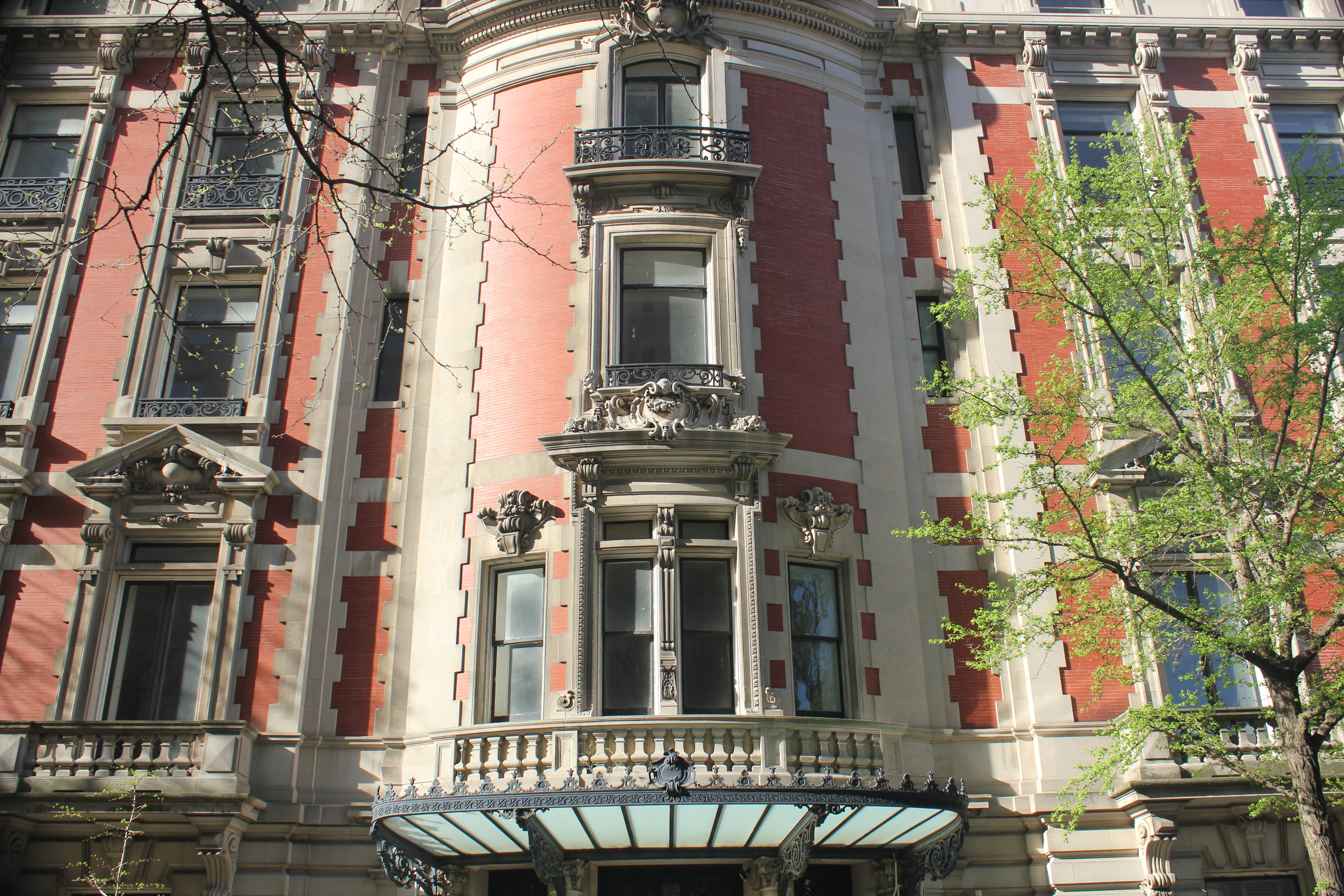
Part of the facade on 82nd Street

The main portion of the 82nd Street elevation consists of the westernmost five bays of that elevation. The third bay from the west, a curved central bay, is flanked by two-bay-wide pavilions that project slightly from the facade. The house's main entrance is in the center bay, underneath a metal-and-glass marquee at the ground story. The doors are made of wrought iron and glass and are flanked by engaged columns and narrow windows on either side. Above the first floor, the center bay consists of a three-story-high window frame made of limestone. On the second story, there are four windows in the center bay; there is a lintel and cartouche above the two center windows and a cartouche above each of the outer windows. The center bay has a rectangular window on the third floor and a segmentally-arched window with cartouche on the fourth floor. Both the third- and fourth-floor windows of the third bay have iron window guards. A balustrade runs above the fourth floor of the third bay.

On the ground story, the side pavilions (comprising the first, second, fourth, and fifth bays from west) have rectangular windows flanked by brackets. These brackets support balconies on the second floor, behind which are French windows; there are triangular pediments above each of the second-story French windows. Within the side pavilions, the windows on the third and fourth floor of each bay are connected by limestone frames, and there are iron window guards in front of the windows. Above the fourth story, brackets hold up a horizontal band course protruding from the facade. There are rectangular windows at the fifth story, as well as limestone belt courses that run across the facade. An ornate cornice, with modillions, runs across the facade just above the fifth floor, with a stone balustrade above the cornice. Dormers with segmentally-arched cartouches protrude from the mansard roof.

The wing at the eastern end of the 82nd Street facade is one bay wide and is clad with rusticated limestone blocks at its base. An oriel window, which resembles a conservatory, projects from the facade at the second story. There is a fluted corbel below the oriel window, as well as floral ornament around the window. Similarly to the other bays, the third floor contains a rectangular window, and the fourth floor includes a segmental arch with a cartouche just above it. Above the fourth floor, the facade of the eastern wing is recessed behind a balustrade.

==== Fifth Avenue ====
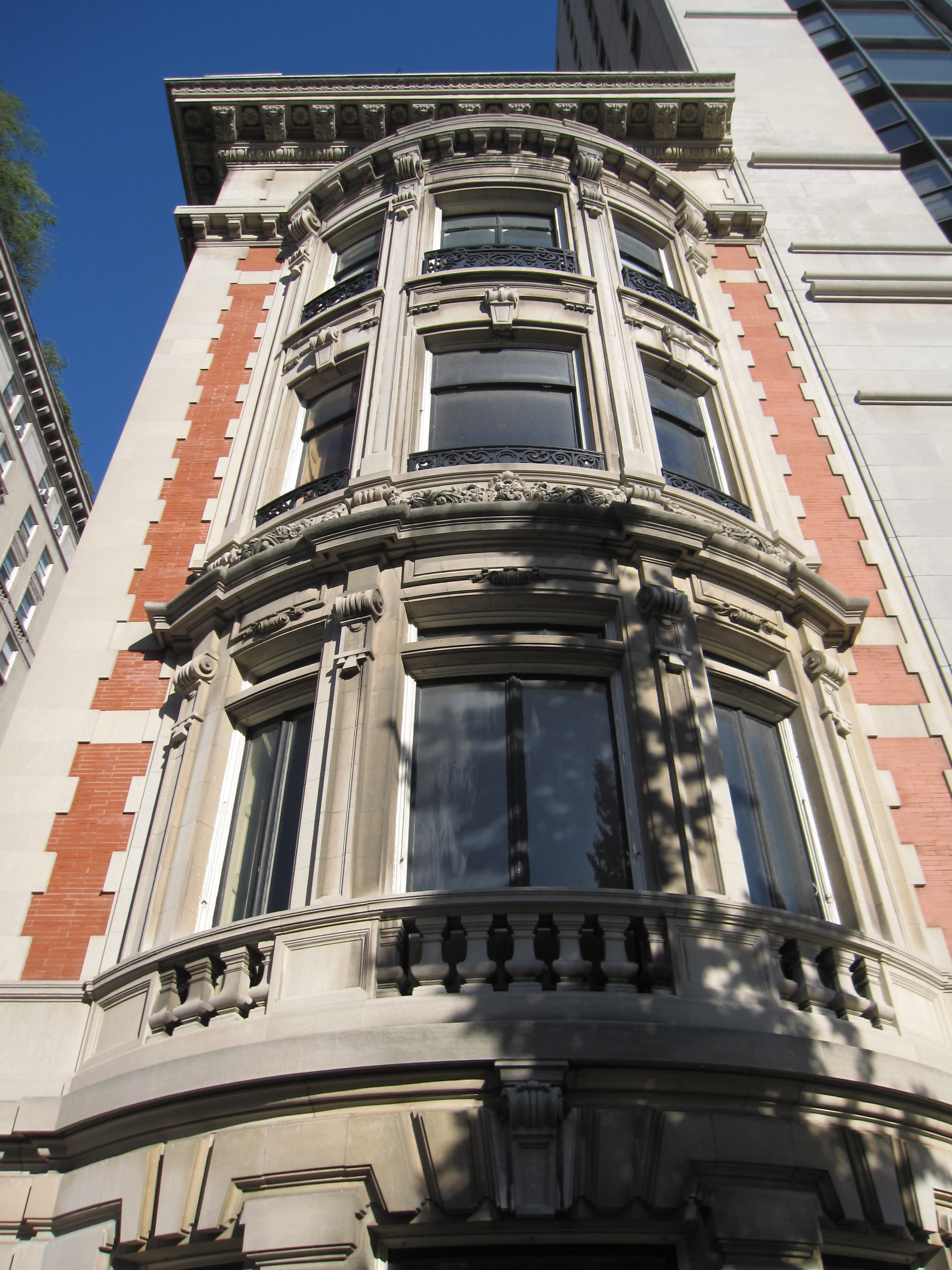
View of the Fifth Avenue facade from ground level

On Fifth Avenue, all three bays are curved outward and are placed within a limestone frame. As with the 82nd Street elevation, the basement and first floors are clad with rusticated limestone; the outer portions of the facade above the first floor are made of red brick. There are limestone balustrades in front of the second-floor windows, as well as garlands on the spandrel panel between the second- and third-story windows. The third- and fourth-story windows all have iron window guards, and the third-story windows are additionally topped by brackets. As with the center bay of the 82nd Street elevation, there is a balustrade above the fourth floor and a cornice above the fifth floor.

=== Features ===
The house is variously cited as covering 19,000 ft^{2} (1,800 m^{2}) or 20,000 ft^{2} (1,900 m^{2}); according to The Wall Street Journal, the house covers 19,628 ft^{2} (1,823.5 m^{2}). The space is split across eight levels, including a basement.

==== Original design ====
The structure originally had either seven or eight bedrooms, as well as ten bathrooms. There were also eleven fireplaces and three elevators. The interior of the house was originally decorated in the French Neoclassical style. The original decorations included sconces, moldings, and wood paneling, which were largely preserved in later years. The first through third floors largely retain their original layout. The main entrance on 82nd Street leads to an outer vestibule clad with marble; a set of doors leads to a stair hall and other ground-level spaces. Within the stair hall is a curved staircase to the second floor, which has an iron railing. The staircase runs the entire height of the building, linking with each story.

The staircase opens directly into a music room on the second floor. The music room has arched doorways on its west and east walls, which respectively lead to a parlor and a dining room. The music room's south wall contains an elevator and another doorway, both of which are topped by panels with motifs depicting musical instruments. The dining room, to the east of the music room, is decorated with roundels with putti; vines painted using a trompe-l'œil technique; simple paneling on the walls; and a marble fireplace mantel. There is a kitchen to the east of the dining room. The parlor, west of the music room has wall paneling ornamented by classical moldings, urns, and cartouches, as well as a white fireplace mantel topped by a frieze with guilloché moldings. In addition, the parlor windows facing Fifth Avenue feature ornate frames with brackets, which support entablatures above the windows.

On the upper floors, the stairway connects with a landing that is flanked by two main rooms to the west and the east. The master bedroom is to the east of the third-floor landing, while a library room is to the west. The doorways in the master bedroom are decorated with foliate and guilloché moldings, and the master bedroom also has a marble fireplace mantel. A plainly designed bedroom is to the east of the master bedroom, within the house's easternmost wing. The western part of the third floor is occupied by a rococo-style library with a red-marble mantel, as well as bookcase built into the walls.

==== Modifications ====
Karl Bock redesigned the house in the 1920s, when many of the original Victorian designs were simplified. Bock further renovated some of the spaces in the 1930s and 1940s. These included an oval bathroom with mirrors and black marble on the walls; another bathroom with blue glass tiles and a modern-style sink; and a dressing room with ribbon-striped sycamore. The modern-day interior also is decorated with "gold-leaf trimmed fixtures and intricate friezes".

By the mid-1980s, two offices occupied the western and eastern portions of the ground floor. The Dukes occupied an apartment on the second and third floors, while they rented out another apartment on the fourth and fifth floors; in addition, there were servants' rooms on the sixth floor. In 1995, the original residence was divided into three apartments, as well as a 250 ft^{2} (23 m^{2}) room for the Duke family on the ground floor. The first four stories became a four-story apartment, measuring 9,800 ft^{2} (910 m^{2}). Another apartment, spanning one story was on the fifth floor. An additional floor was created by raising the mansard roof, accommodating a third apartment on the sixth and seventh floors. By the 2010s, the house had 12 bedrooms and 14 bathrooms.

== History ==
Before William W. and Thomas M. Hall had developed the mansions at 1006–1009 Fifth Avenue, the site at the southeast corner of Fifth Avenue and 82nd Street was undeveloped. In July 1899, the Halls hired Welch, Smith & Provot to design three five-story mansions at the southeast corner of Fifth Avenue and 82nd Street at a cost of $255,000 (equivalent to $9,868,500 in 2025). The New York City Department of Buildings granted the developers a single work permit for the three houses, occupying the lots at 1007–1009 Fifth Avenue. All three houses were completed in 1901 and were speculative developments.

=== Duke ownership ===
==== Benjamin and James Duke ====
The Halls sold the houses at 1007 through 1009 Fifth Avenue in April 1901. Kate F. Timmerman and William A. Hall (Note: According to Landmarks Preservation Commission 1977, p. 93, William A. Hall of 1007 Fifth Avenue is not related to the developers.) had respectively acquired the adjacent houses at 1007 and 1008 Fifth Avenue, while William H. Gelshenen occupied 1006 Fifth Avenue. Contemporary sources initially reported that tobacco businessman James Buchanan Duke had acquired the house at 1009 Fifth Avenue, facing 82nd Street. In June 1901, William W. Hall finalized his sale of 1009 Fifth Avenue to James's brother Benjamin Newton Duke, the chairman of the American Tobacco Company, which Benjamin and James Duke had cofounded. Benjamin and his wife Sarah Duke are recorded as having owned the house during the early 1900s. It is not known why Benjamin Duke did not develop his own house, as he was worth $60 million at the time (equal to $2.32 billion in 2025). Nonetheless, the house was originally unoccupied; Benjamin is recorded as having lived at a hotel, Hoffman House, until 1907.

In late 1906, James met cotton heiress Nanaline Holt Inman at a party in his brother's house. James married Nanaline eight months later, in July 1907, and bought a plot at the northeast corner of Fifth Avenue and 78th Street, where he intended to build a mansion. That November, James acquired the house at 1009 Fifth Avenue from his brother. James is recorded as having lived in the house by early 1908, when he gave testimony from his bedroom as part of an antitrust lawsuit that the federal government had brought against the American Tobacco Company. Benjamin Duke moved to the Plaza Hotel in 1909. By the 1910 United States census, James and Nanaline lived there, along with Nanaline's mother Florence Holt and nine servants.

James's mansion at Fifth Avenue and 78th Street, the James B. Duke House, was completed in 1912. The same year, Benjamin built his own house at Fifth Avenue and 89th Street on the future site of the Solomon R. Guggenheim Museum. The banker Moses Taylor, who worked for the firm Kean, Taylor & Co., leased the house in December 1913 for $30,000 per year (equivalent to $977,273 in 2025). The mansion became the residence of one of Benjamin Duke's sons, Angier Buchanan Duke, and Angier's wife Cordelia Biddle, of the wealthy Biddle family. Angier and Cordelia's son Angier Biddle Duke was born at the house in 1915.

==== Biddle family ====
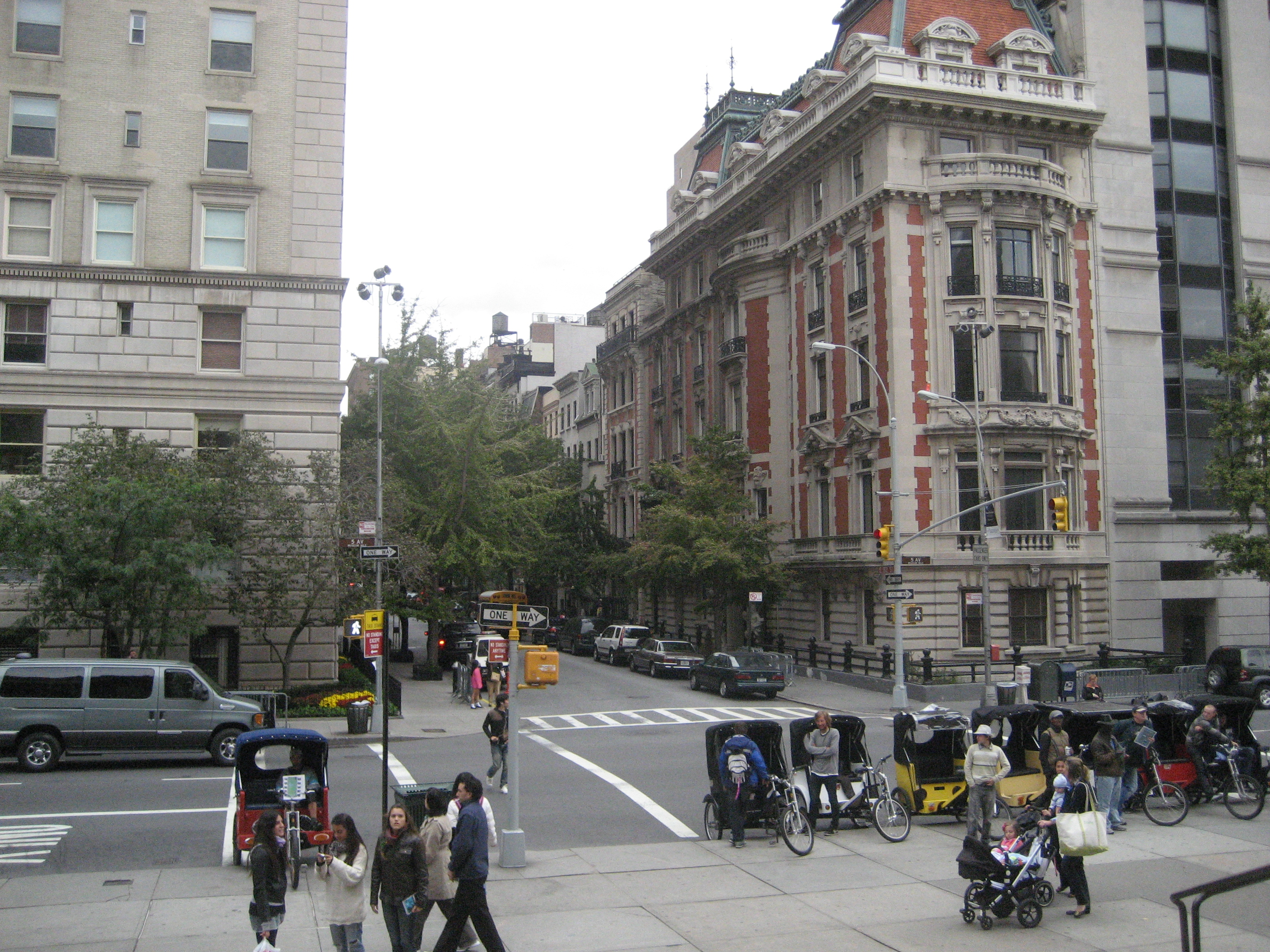
Viewed from the steps of The Met Fifth Avenue, across Fifth Avenue

By the early 1920s, the house was occupied by Angier's sister Mary Lillian Duke Biddle and her husband A. J. Drexel Biddle Jr. Sources disagree over whether the Biddles moved into the house in 1919 or 1922. The couple had two children: their daughter Mary Duke Biddle II (later Mary Semans) was born in 1920, while their son Nicholas B. D. Biddle was born in 1921. They split their time between 1009 Fifth Avenue and an estate in Irvington, New York. Mary Lillian Duke was responsible for renovating the house's interior, removing some plasterwork, adding black marble decorations in one bathroom, and adding brass and wrought-iron railings to one of the staircases. These decorations were designed by Karl Bock, whose additions were largely supplemented the original French-style decorations. By the mid-1920s, many of Fifth Avenue's former mansions were rapidly being replaced with apartment buildings, although the Biddles' mansion remained intact.

The Biddles divorced in 1931, upon which Mary Lillian Duke retained ownership of the house. The younger Mary and her brother Nicholas continued to live at 1009 Fifth Avenue with their mother. During the 1930s, the elder Mary hosted several events at the house, including a 1936 "musicale" with many high-society guests. Bock continued to make alterations to the house throughout the 1930s and 1940s. Mary Lillian Duke bought an estate in Durham, North Carolina, in 1935 and began spending increasing amounts of time there. By 1950, she lived in Durham for six months of the year, splitting her remaining time between 1009 Fifth Avenue and another estate in Florida. The facade was repainted gray in the 1950s. Mary Lillian Duke continued to own 1009 Fifth Avenue until her death in 1960.

Mary Duke Biddle II and her husband, doctor James Semans, assumed ownership of the house after the elder Mary had died. By then, 1009 Fifth Avenue was one of five remaining single-family mansions on the Millionaires' Row section of Fifth Avenue. During the early 1960s, the upper stories were split into a separate apartment.

==== Preservation ====
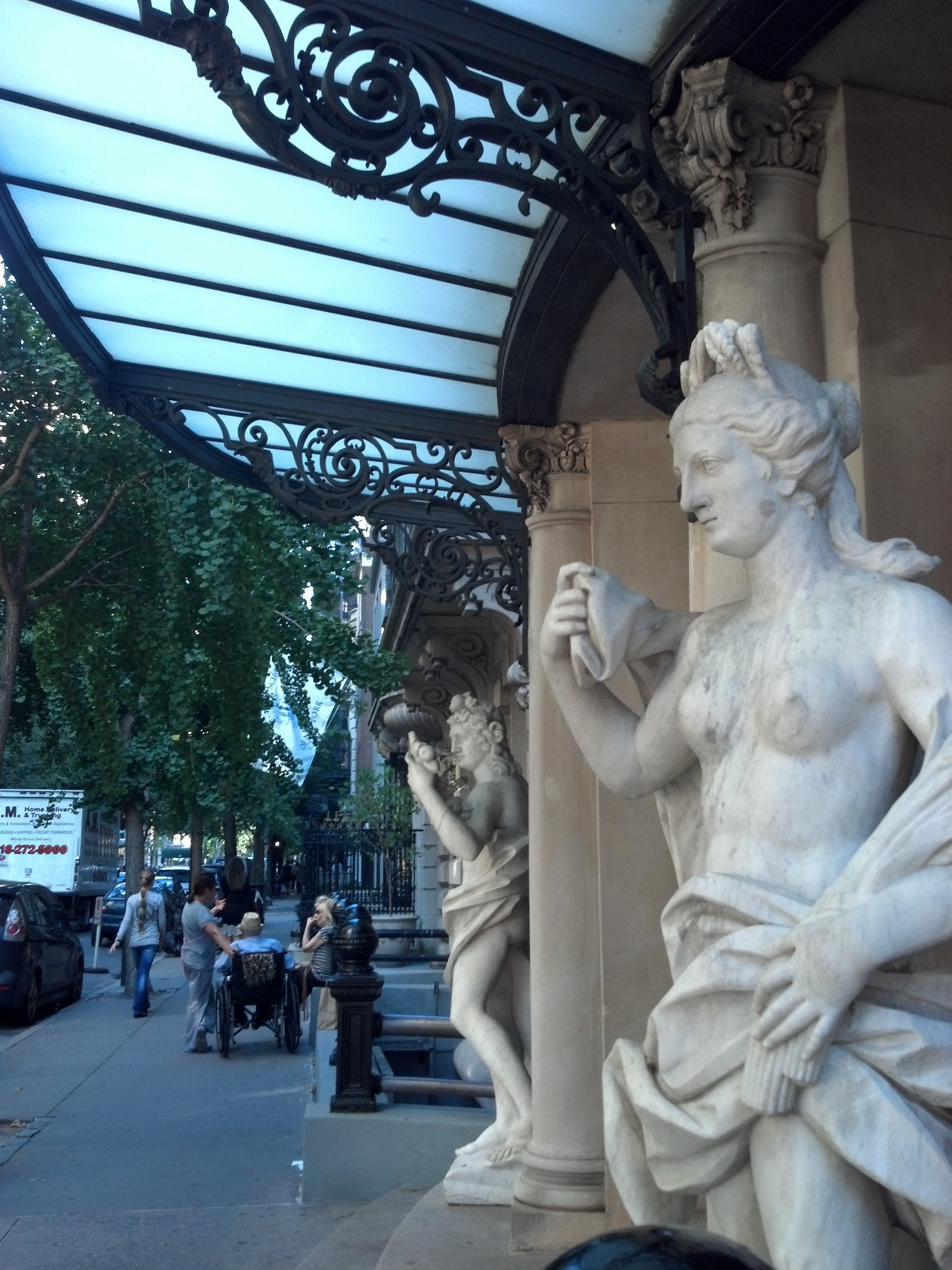
Side view of the entrance on 82nd Street

In the early 1970s, Sol Goldman and Donald Zucker announced plans to demolish the houses at 1006–1008 Fifth Avenue and 2 East 82nd Street, replacing them with a 25-story apartment house. Mary Semans not only refused to sell her family's house but was also petitioning the New York City Landmarks Preservation Commission (LPC) to designate the building as a landmark. At the time, Semans occupied two floors, while New York University's Hall of Fame occupied the ground story. Semans reportedly rejected sales offers of over $1 million for her family's house. A local group, the Neighborhood Association to Preserve Fifth Avenue Houses, received an injunction in September 1972, preventing 1006 and 1007 Fifth Avenue from being demolished. The New York Supreme Court overturned the injunction two days later, and the buildings were immediately razed.

By 1973, the LPC was considering designating 998, 1008, and 1009 Fifth Avenue and 2 East 82nd Street as city landmarks. Although the Neighborhood Association had wanted the LPC to host a public hearing for the entire city block, the LPC was only considering these four buildings as individual city landmarks. The American Institute of Architects and priest Louis Gigante were among those who supported the designations. The LPC designated 998 and 1009 Fifth Avenue as city landmarks on February 19, 1974, preventing major changes to these buildings without the LPC's permission. However, the LPC declined to designate the other two structures, which Goldman and Zucker owned; in particular, 1008 Fifth Avenue was ineligible for landmark designation because it had been heavily modified. Richard Peck of The New York Times wrote that the house's landmark designation only covered a single site and "has not preserved the block against a high-rise of two-and-a-half-room apartment units".

The Neighborhood Association sued the LPC in March 1975, claiming that the agency had refused to consider designating the stretch of 82nd Street between Fifth and Madison Avenues, including 1009 Fifth Avenue, as a New York City historic district. That year, a state judge ruled that the LPC was required to at least host public hearings for the proposed district. The LPC finally began considering designating 1009 Fifth Avenue as part of the Metropolitan Museum Historic District in early 1977; it was larger than the proposed 82nd Street historic district. As negotiations for the Metropolitan Museum district proceeded, the neighboring house at 1008 Fifth Avenue was demolished in March 1975. That September, the LPC designated 1009 Fifth Avenue as part of the Metropolitan Museum Historic District, a collection of 19th- and early 20th-century mansions around Fifth Avenue between 78th and 86th Streets. Ultimately, Goldman and Zucker's original plan fell through, and Peter Kalikow leased the apartment-house site.

==== Renovations ====
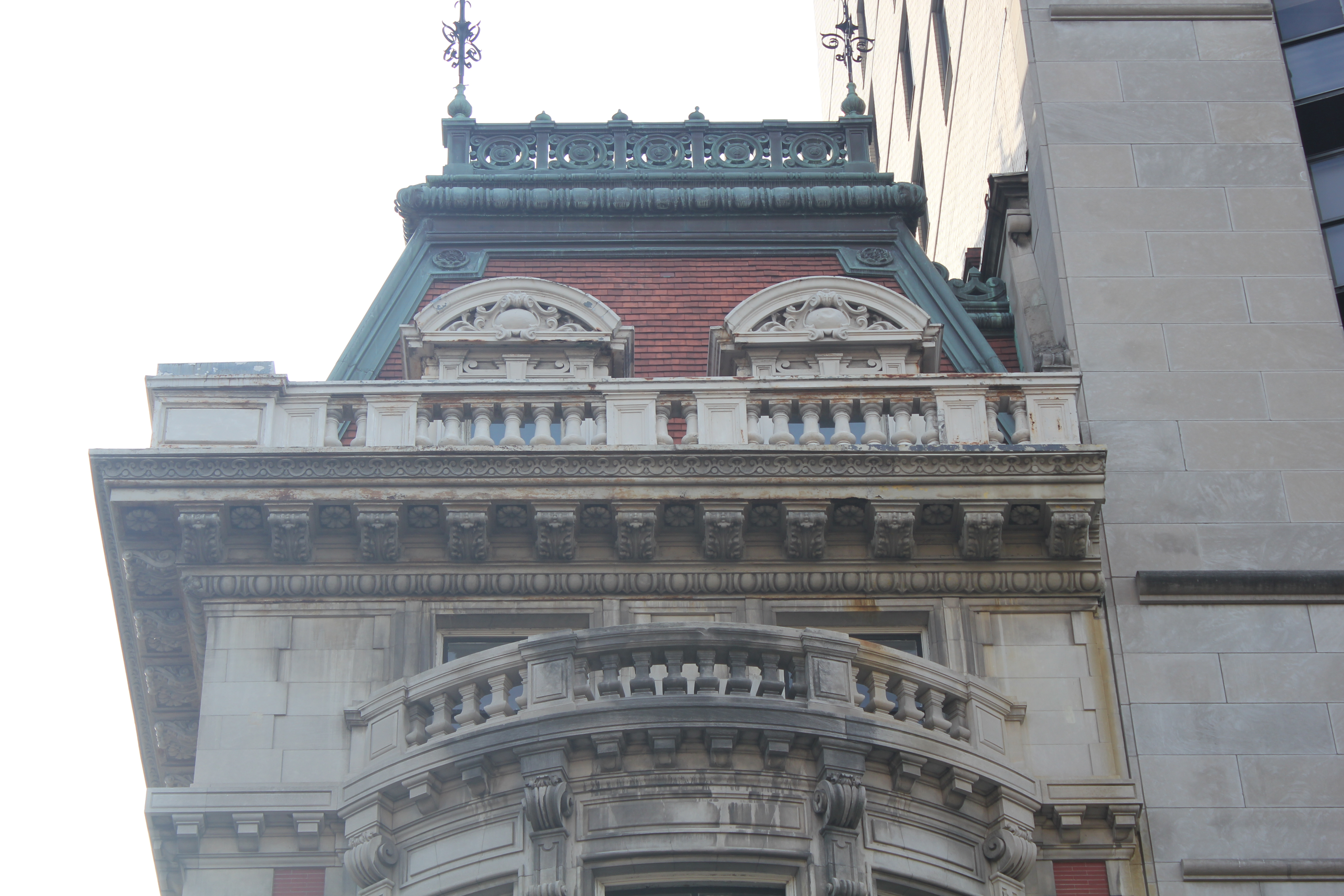
Upper stories and roof on Fifth Avenue

The house underwent a two-year restoration in the 1980s to designs by Gerald Allen, who restored the exterior based on drawings in the collection of Columbia University's Avery Architectural and Fine Arts Library. Joseph Fiebiger, whose grandfather had created the original wrought-iron decorations, was hired to rebuild the corroded copper roof. Between six and eight employees of the Fiebiger company worked on the project for two years. The firm created 48 molds of pieces on the existing roof, then manufactured custom replacement pieces in its workshop; it had to buy a custom hydraulic press to mold the copper pieces. The Fiebiger company also installed six wrought-iron finials as a gift to the Duke family. The balustrades on the facade were also replaced. The contractors used a biodegradable paint remover on the facade, and they treated the wrought-iron window guards with polyurethane, epoxy, and an organic zinc mixture to prevent the iron from rusting. The Semans family then restored the interiors using photographs that were stored in the attic of one of the Duke family's houses in North Carolina.

The house was added to the National Register of Historic Places in 1989. Mary Semans placed her family's house for sale in 1991 but wished to retain part of the house as a pied-à-terre. At this point, Semans mostly lived in North Carolina. Bradford Gannett of Coldwell Banker, who had been hired to sell the house, said he was negotiating with foundations or wealthy individuals involved with the arts, who could preserve the house if he could not find a seller. Semans also began negotiating to sell some of the house's unused air rights to Kalikow, who had been forced to seal up several apartments in the townhouse at 2 East 82nd Street to obtain 15,000 ft^{2} (1,400 m^{2}) of additional space in the apartment building at 1001 Fifth Avenue. The sale of the air rights would allow Kalikow to unseal the apartments at 2 East 82nd Street. Semans ultimately withdrew her offer to sell the house.

By 1995, the Duke family was renovating the house into luxury condominium apartments. At the time, the descendants of Benjamin Duke only occupied a single room in the house. The project also included renovating the basement into doctors' offices, raising the roof to create a seventh story, and splitting the interior into three floors. As part of this project, the plumbing and heating systems were also refurbished. Although the condominium conversion was ultimately canceled, some of the space was rented out. The four-story apartment was rented for $50,000 a month.

=== Sales ===
==== Sapir ownership ====
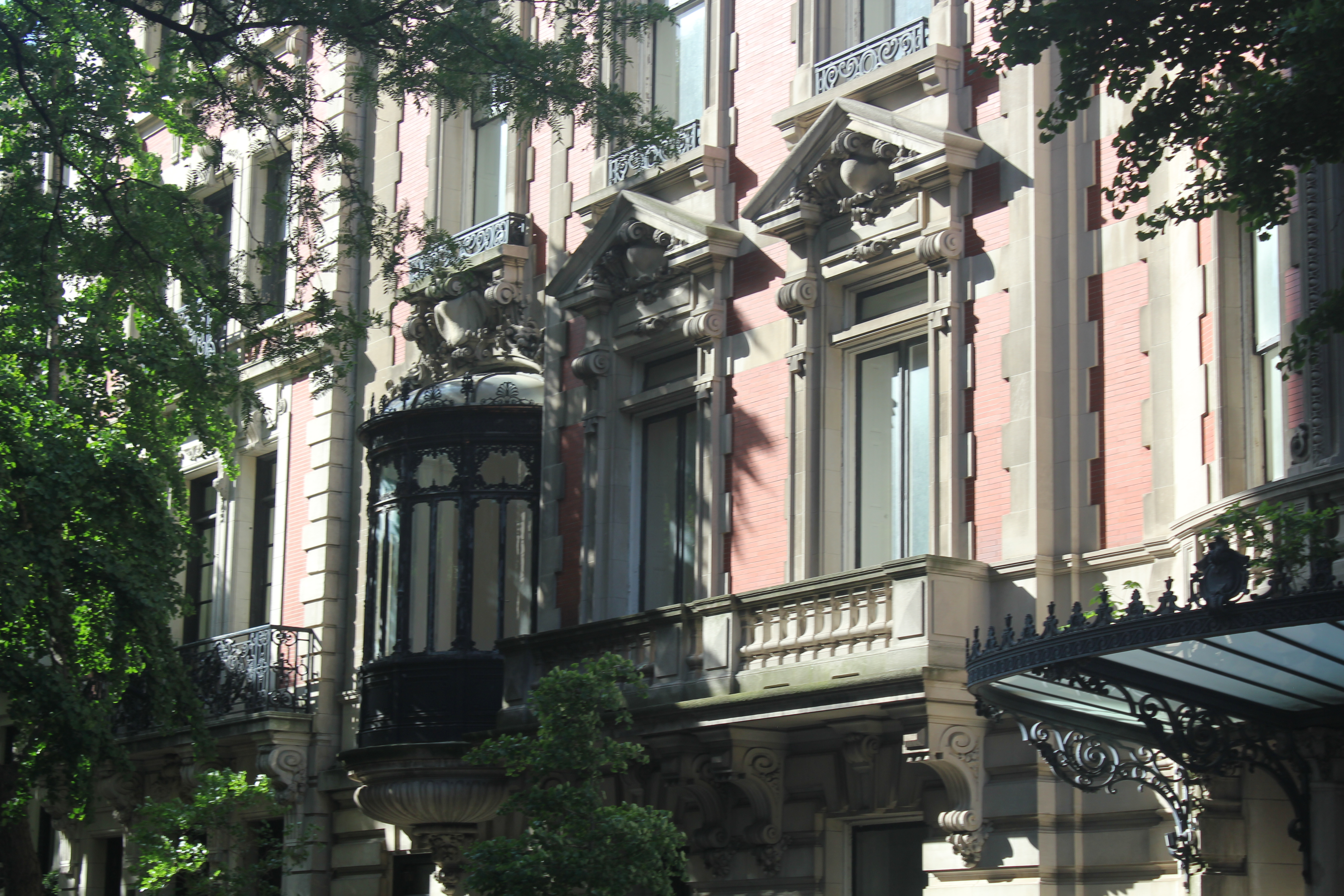
Windows at the far east end of the 82nd Street facade

Mary Semans placed the mansion for sale in 2005, as none of her descendants lived in the city. The mansion, which was described as the last intact mansion on Fifth Avenue, was listed for $50 million, making it the second most expensive residence in New York City at the time. Semans said of any potential buyer, "The only thing I would like is that they keep the house sort of the way it is now". One of the three brokers, Sharon Baum of the Corcoran Group, marketed the house as a single-family residence, though potential buyers could also divide the house into multiple condos. Because of its high asking price, the house's brokers only offered tours to potential buyers after checking their bank accounts. The brokers experienced difficulties in showing the house to prospective buyers, as the brokers needed permission from the two existing tenants, and they could not show the building when staff members were on vacation.

By August 2005, sixteen millionaires had visited the property, and three had made bids. Among the bidders were rock musician Lenny Kravitz, who wished to acquire the Duke–Semans Mansion as a headquarters for his company Kravitz Design. In total, 40 prospective buyers toured the house before it was sold. Tamir Sapir, an American businessman and former taxi driver, paid $40 million for the building in January 2006. This was the highest amount ever paid for a townhouse in Manhattan at the time. At the time, Sapir planned to move his collection of sculptures to the upper floors. He had also planned to live in the penthouse with his partner and their daughter, who was then two years old. Sapir ultimately never moved his sculpture collection to the house, and a proposal to convert the house to luxury apartments also failed.

==== Slim ownership ====
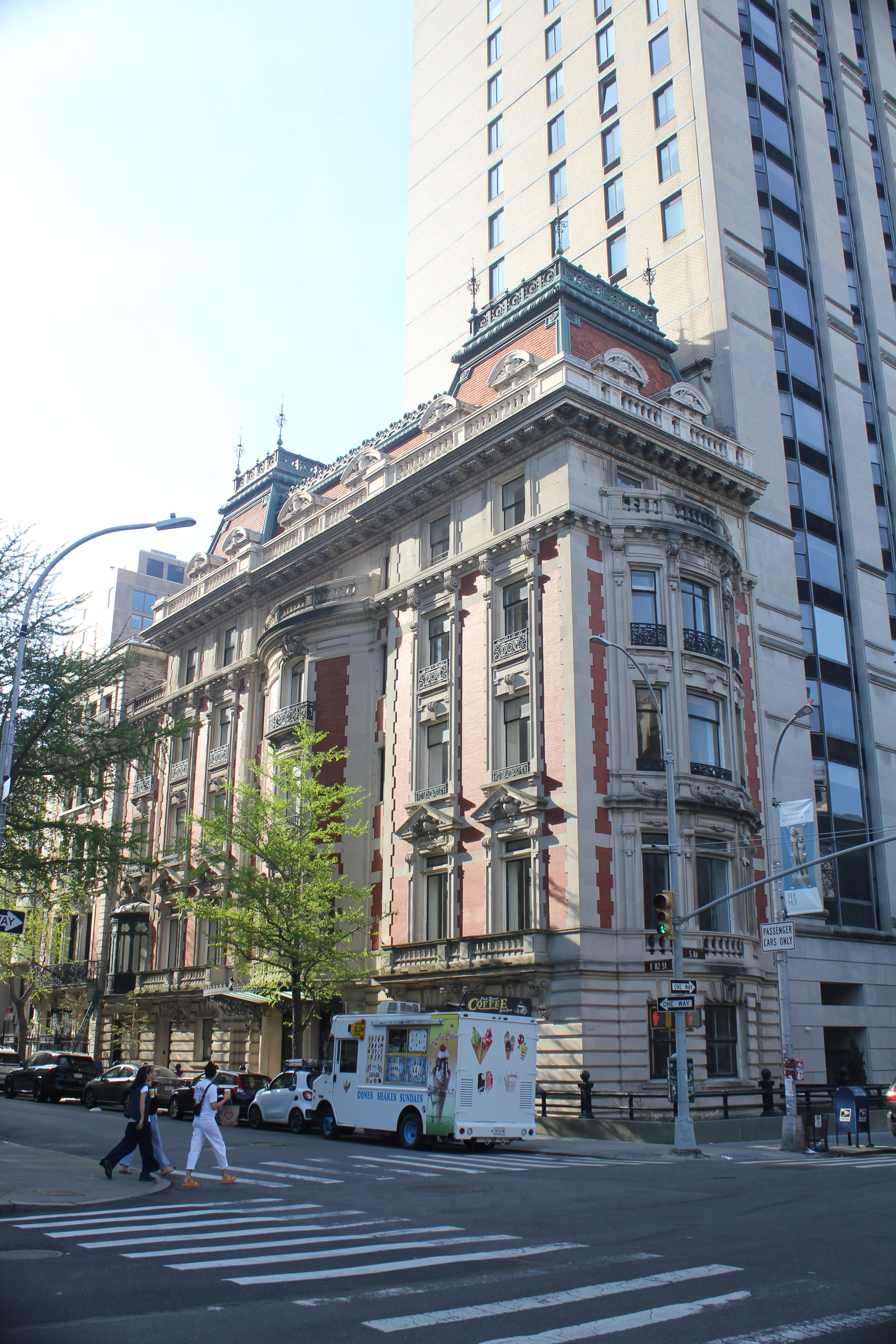
View from the western side of Fifth Avenue north of 82nd Street

Sapir placed the mansion for sale in January 2010 for $50 million, and Paula Del Nunzio of brokerage firm Brown Harris Stevens was hired to market the building under an exclusive listing agreement. Sapir finalized his sale of the building in July 2010; sources initially reported that a Russian businessman had bought the house. Mexican telecom magnate Carlos Slim, at the time the richest person in the world, was reported as the buyer, having paid $44 million. At the time, it was the fourth-most-expensive townhouse ever sold in New York City. Brown Harris Stevens sued Sapir for breach of contract in August 2010, claiming that Sapir had tried to avoid paying a broker's commission to Del Nunzio by secretly negotiating directly with Slim, then waiting until Del Nunzio's contract had expired before finalizing the sale. Brown Harris Stevens alleged that, when Sapir sold the house to Slim, he had already agreed to sell the house to a client of Del Nunzio for $37 million. The lawsuit was settled in December 2010.

In May 2015, Sotheby's placed 1009 Fifth Avenue for sale at an asking price of $80 million, nearly twice the amount Slim had paid for it. The house became one of the most expensive public listings in New York City. Slim canceled the sale in early 2016 after no one expressed interest in buying the house. He placed the house for sale again in January 2023.

== Critical reception ==
Soon after the house was completed, Montgomery Schuyler criticized mansions on Fifth Avenue in general, saying: "We hold these truths to be self-evident that, when a man goes into 'six figures' for his dwelling house, he ought not to make its upperworks of sheet metal. That is a cheap pretence which nothing can distinguish from vulgarity." By contrast, Richard Peck of The New York Times wrote in 1974 that 1009 Fifth Avenue was "quintessential Fifth Avenue Beaux Arts". Christopher Gray, writing for the same newspaper in 1995, said that the house's modern-style rooms were "among the most unusual interiors on Fifth Avenue". The New York Observer wrote in 2015 that the building was "a Beaux-Arts confection eight stories tall with a corner orientation that offers that most rare of townhouse qualities—good light".

== See also ==
- List of New York City Designated Landmarks in Manhattan from 59th to 110th Streets
- National Register of Historic Places listings in Manhattan from 59th to 110th Streets
