= Measurement Incorporated =

- Type: Employee-owned
- Founded: 1980; 46 years ago in Durham, North Carolina
- Founder: Henry H. Scherich
- Headquarters: Durham, North Carolina, United States
- Key people: Henry H. Scherich, Nelson Androes, Michael B. Bunch, Kirk Ridge, Alex A. Avila, Anthony Horton, Thomas Kelsh, Joe McClintock, Corey Palermo, Travis Wicker
- Products: PEG Writing, PEG Writing Scholar, Utah Compose
- Website: measurementinc.com

Measurement Incorporated is an educational testing company based in Durham, North Carolina. The company was founded in 1980 by Henry Scherich. Measurement Incorporated currently administers state-wide standardized tests for Arizona, California, Michigan, and Washington State. Measurement Incorporated also administers the Independent School Entrance Examination (ISEE) for the Educational Records Bureau.

== Products and services ==
Measurement Incorporated (MI) provides assessment services, automated essay scoring products, online testing and development, and professional services. MI also provides traditional paper and pencil assessments.

== Corporate affairs ==
=== Historic preservation ===
Measurement Incorporated has purchased and renovated three historic buildings in downtown Durham, North Carolina: the Brodie Duke Warehouse, the Imperial Tobacco Warehouse, and the BC Remedy Building.

Built around 1878, the Brodie Duke Warehouse is one of the oldest tobacco-related buildings in town. Brodie Duke was the oldest surviving child of Washington Duke, and was the first of the Duke family to move to Durham. He made a living by selling tobacco from the floor below his living space. After a while, the rest of Brodie's family followed in his footsteps, selling their farm and moving to Durham. Brodie and his father shared a warehouse at this time, and held an agreement by which each would sell the other's products. Eventually, Brodie built his own warehouse, the Brodie Duke Warehouse, and joined with his family to create W. Duke, Sons & Co.

The Imperial Tobacco Warehouse was built during the 1890s, and was originally owned and used by the Imperial Tobacco Company. In retaliation against James Buchanan Duke's expansion of the American Tobacco Company into Europe, the lead European tobacco companies combined to create the Imperial Tobacco Company, and expand to the United States' market. For a while, the two companies had a deal, by which neither would enter each other's market. However, in attempt to lower their prices in Europe, the Imperial Tobacco Company established their own organization in the United States. In 1965, the building was sold to the DC May decorating company, and in 1987, it was leased to the film crew of Bull Durham, starring Kevin Costner and Susan Sarandon. In 2005, it was sold to, and renovated by, MI.

The BC Remedy Building was formerly owned by Five Points Drug Company. Built in the early 1920s, it was used to produce BC Powder, an over-the-counter pain reliever, commonly used for headaches, that contains aspirin and caffeine. In the 1970s, the building was used as an operations center for Central Carolina Bank and Trust, and was later sold to MI, who renovated it into an office space.

== Criticism and controversies ==
=== Testing problems ===
In 2005, about 890 Ohio high school students thought they had failed a test, when they had actually passed. A scoring error was made by MI on the ISEE admission test for the 2010/2011 testing year, about 7000 (or 17%) of the testing students received incorrect scores because the wrong key had been used. In 2016, the state of Michigan fined the company $400,000 for not delivering test scores on time.

=== TNReady lawsuit ===
In 2016, the state of Tennessee terminated two contracts, worth a total of $165 million with the company after the failure of their online testing platform followed by a failure to deliver paper versions of the tests. In June 2017, Measurement Incorporated sued the State of Tennessee Department of Education for $25.3 million. The Department of Education responded in January 2018 with a counterclaim, saying the company did not fulfill its duties.

The case is currently pending with the Tennessee Claims Commission and is slated to go to trial in late 2019.

=== Religious discrimination ===
In 2011, the U.S. Equal Employment Opportunity Commission (EEOC) fined Measurement Incorporated $110,000 for discriminating against Jacqueline Dukes when she was fired for refusing to work on her Sabbath (EEOC v. Measurement, Inc., Civil Action No. 1:10-cv-00623 in U.S. District Court for the Middle District of North Carolina).
