= The Ark (Duke University) =

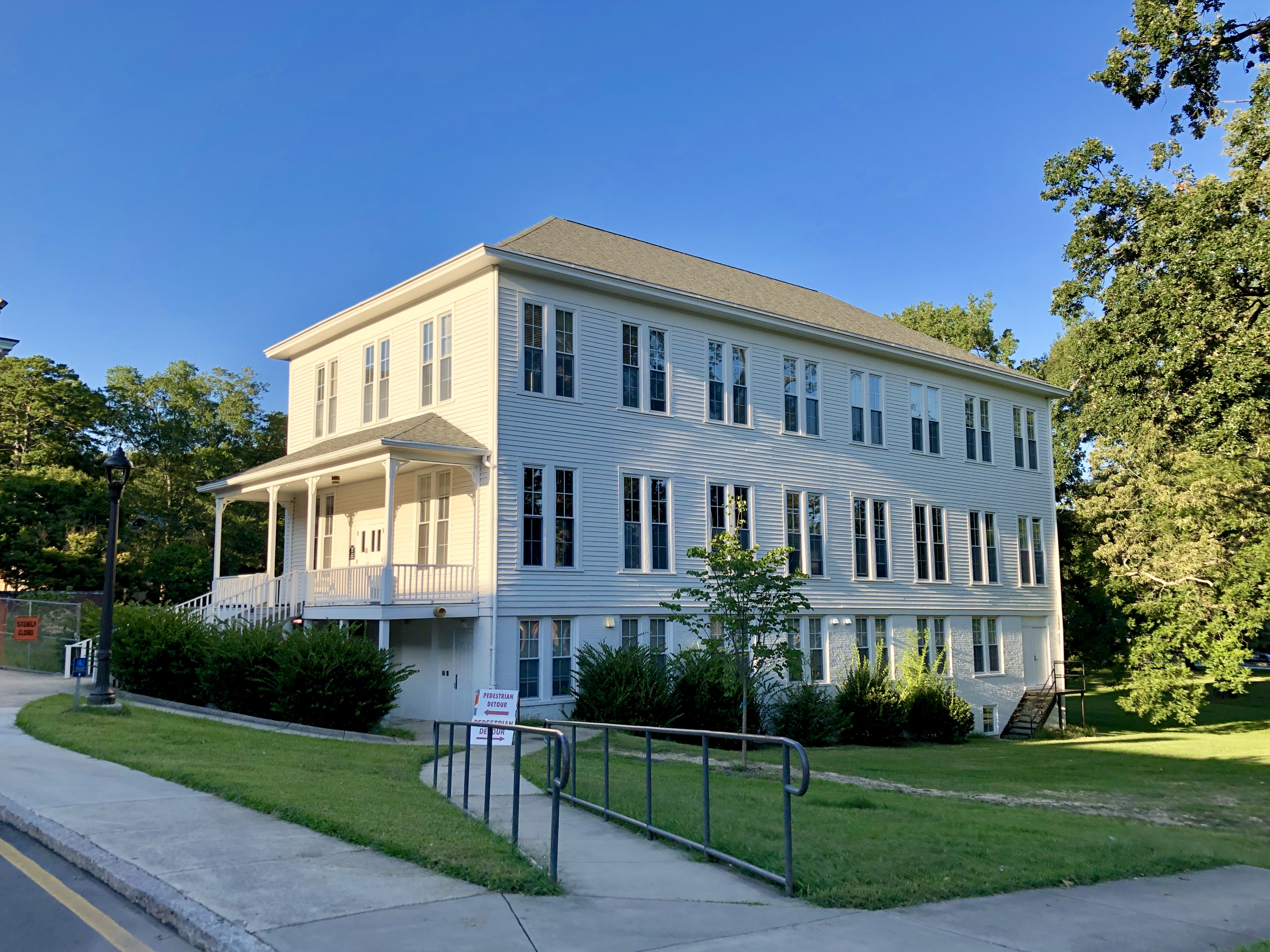
- The Ark in 2019
- Interactive map of The Ark
- Former names: Angier B. Duke Gymnasium
- Location: 14 Epworth Lane; Durham, NC 27708
- Coordinates: 36.007143°N 78.913558°W
- Owner: Duke University
- Operator: Duke University

Construction
- Built: 1898

Tenant
- Duke Blue Devils (NCAA) 1906–1923

The Ark is a building on the East Campus of Duke University in Durham, North Carolina. It serves as an instructional and rehearsal studio for the Duke Dance Program. Built in 1898 as Angier B. Duke Gymnasium, The Ark became the first home for the Duke Blue Devils men's basketball team, then known as Trinity College, in 1906. The team moved after the 1923 season, upon the completion of Alumni Memorial Gymnasium. The Ark's current name is derived from the narrow walkway that was originally used to reach the building, forcing people to enter "two-by-two".

== History ==
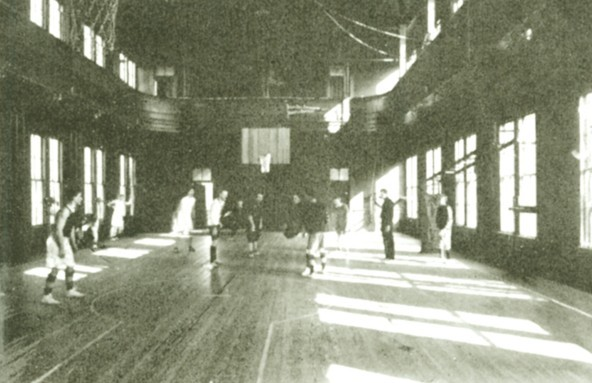
Basketball game at The Ark circa 1912

Angier B. Duke Gymnasium was constructed in 1898, funded by a donation from Benjamin N. Duke, who named it for his son, Angier. The gym served as the host for the second college basketball game in the State of North Carolina on March 2, 1906, with Wake Forest defeating Trinity by a score of 24–10. The playing surface measured just 50' x 32', much smaller than a modern court, which measures 94' x 50'. After the basketball team moved, the building was used in varying capacities over the next several decades, including as a laundry facility, a recreation center, and a coffeehouse/nightclub, before settling into its current use as a dance studio.
