= Angier B. Duke =

Angier B. Duke may refer to:

- Angier Buchanan Duke (1884–1923), trustee of Duke University and father of Angier Biddle Duke
- Angier Biddle Duke (1915–1995), American diplomat and son of Angier Buchanan Duke
