= Robin Chandler Duke =

American women's reproductive rights advocate and diplomat (1923–2016)

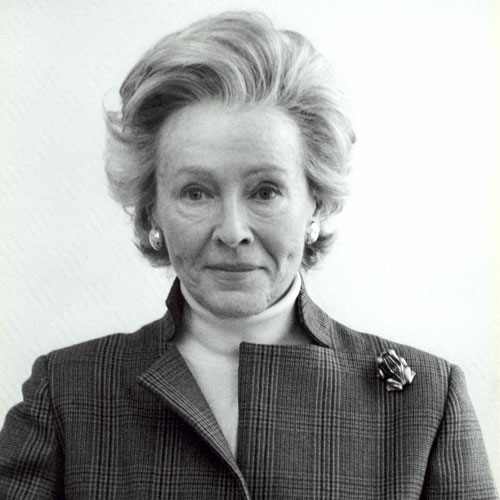

United States Ambassador to Norway
- In office September 12, 2000 – March 1, 2001
- President: Bill Clinton; George W. Bush
- Preceded by: David Hermelin
- Succeeded by: John D. Ong

Personal details
- Born: Grace Esther Tippett; October 13, 1923 Baltimore, Maryland, U.S.
- Died: February 6, 2016 (aged 92) Charleston, South Carolina, U.S.
- Spouse(s): Jeffrey Lynn (m. 1946; div. 1958) Angier Biddle Duke (m. 1962; died 1995)
- Children: 3

Robin Chandler Duke (born Grace Esther Tippett; October 13, 1923 – February 6, 2016) was an American women's reproductive rights advocate and diplomat. She was the United States Ambassador to Norway from 2000 to 2001.

== Early life ==
Born Grace Esther Tippett in Baltimore, Maryland, she was the daughter of Richard Edgar Tippett and Esther (Chandler) Tippett. After her parents separated, she got modeling jobs at Lord & Taylor and elsewhere to help support her mother and sister.

== Career ==
She began her journalism career in 1944 as a writer for the women's page of the New York Journal-American using the byline Robin Chandler.

Later, after marrying actor Jeffrey Lynn, with whom she had two children, she found work at NBC-affiliate WCAU-TV in Philadelphia as a news reader. In 1952 she became an anchor-reporter with Dave Garroway, and covered national political conventions and the marriage of Jacqueline Bouvier to John F. Kennedy in 1953.

From October 24, 1950, to November 1, 1951, she was host of the television program Meet Your Cover Girl, on which she interviewed models. The program was broadcast on CBS on Tuesdays and Wednesdays at 3:30 p.m. Eastern Time.

She was a broker at Orvis Brothers from 1953 to 1958. She was then vice-president for public relations at Pepsi-Cola until 1962.

Chandler Duke was active in organizations relating to women's rights, family planning, and population studies. In addition to serving as national co-chairwoman of the Population Crisis Committee/Draper Fund, which financed International Planned Parenthood, she was a founder of the United Nations Fund for Population Activities; chairwoman of Population Action International; president and later chairwoman of the National Abortion Rights Action League; and president of Naral Pro-Choice America. In 1997 she received the "Maggie" Award, highest honor of the Planned Parenthood Federation, in tribute to their founder, Margaret Sanger.

A co-founder of the United States-Japan Foundation and a trustee of the Institute of International Education, Chandler Duke was also a director of the David and Lucile Packard Foundation and the World Childhood Foundation. She served on other boards, including those of the Guggenheim Museum, Rockwell International, and Emigrant Savings Bank.

=== Ambassador to Norway ===
In 2000-2001, Chandler Duke was United States ambassador to Norway, appointed by Bill Clinton to serve for the final year of his administration. She was previously accorded ambassadorial rank when, in 1980, President Jimmy Carter asked her to lead the United States delegation to the 21st United Nations Educational, Scientific and Cultural Organization conference in Belgrade, Serbia.

== Personal life ==
In 1946, she married actor Jeffrey Lynn (1909–1995), with whom she had two children before their divorce in 1958:

- Jeffrey Lynn
- Letitia Lynn

In 1962, she married Angier Biddle Duke (1915–1995), son of Angier Buchanan Duke. Angier Biddle Duke was chief of protocol for the U.S. Department of State under President John F. Kennedy. After the assassination of President Kennedy, Angier Biddle Duke became Lyndon B. Johnson's chief of staff, and ambassador to Denmark, Spain and Morocco. Together, the couple had one son:

- Angier Biddle Duke, Jr. (b. 1962), who married Idoline A. Scheerer, the daughter of William Scheerer II, in 1990.

Angier Biddle Duke died in 1995. Robin Chandler Duke died on February 6, 2016, aged 92, in a retirement community in Charleston, South Carolina.

Diplomatic posts
| Preceded by David Hermelin | United States Ambassador to Norway; 2000–2001 | Succeeded by John D. Ong |
