= Erwin Mill =

Defunct textile mill in Durham, North Carolina

Coordinates: 36.008°N 78.923°W

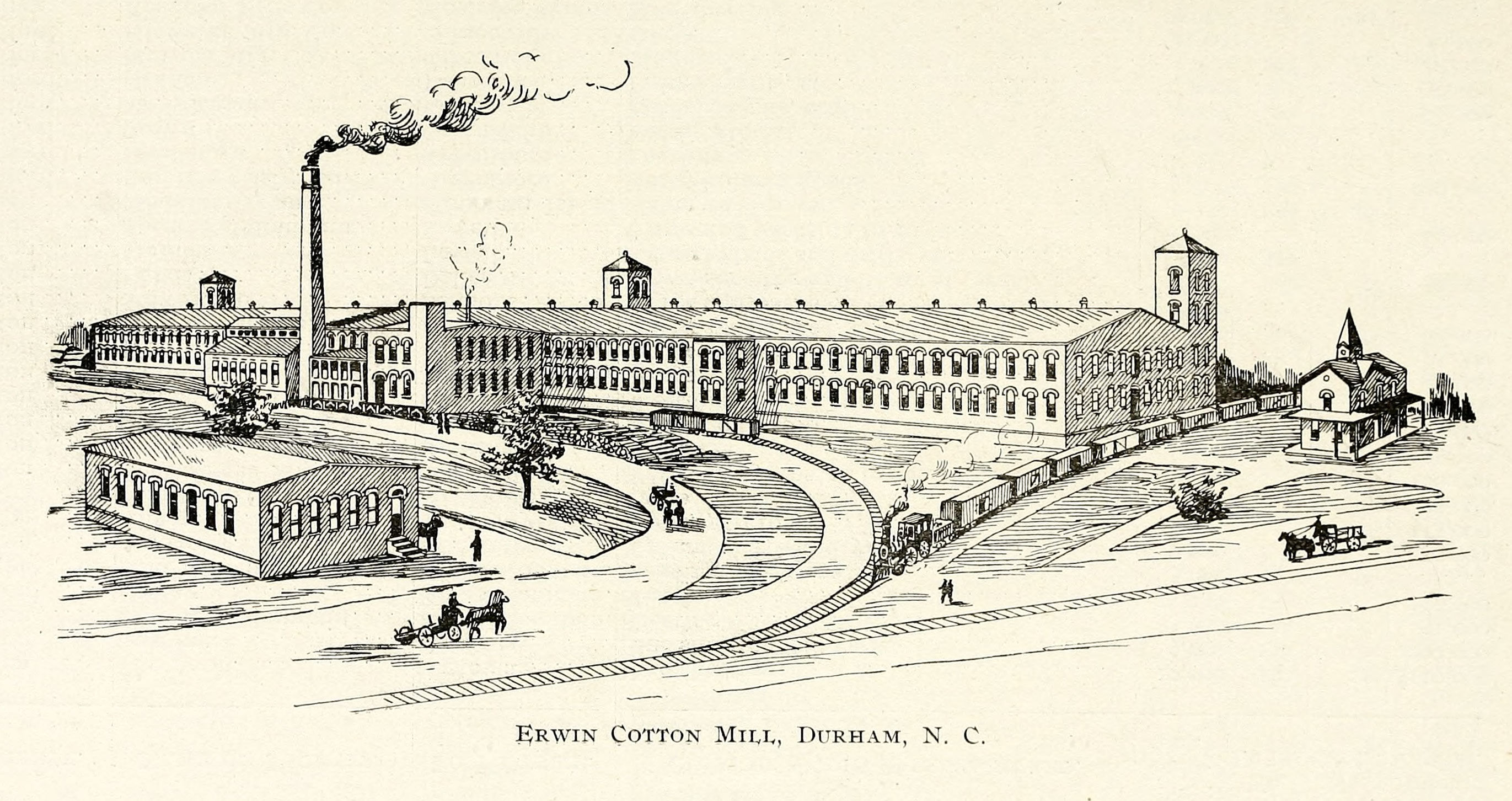
Erwin Cotton Mills, 1897 illustration

Erwin Mill was a textile mill in Durham, North Carolina that operated between the years of 1893 and 1986. After seeing the success of other cotton mills in the Northeast and locally in Durham, entrepreneur Benjamin N. Duke incorporated the mill in 1892 and recruited William H. Erwin to manage the enterprise. The mill's success in the late 19th and early 20th centuries was the result of Erwin's and his successors' exceptional management tactics, even when the factory hit obstacles such as the Great Depression and the unionization of its workers. The mill grew quickly in the late 19th century and early 20th century, became one of North Carolina's largest cotton mills. It originally produced muslin pouches for tobacco, but the mill would later expand its production to other fabrics, becoming one of the largest producers of denim in the world during the early 1900s. Workers at the mill enjoyed some of the best working conditions and highest wages in textile factories throughout the southern United States. Mill employees would later sign union-friendly labor agreements that were radical to the southern textile industry in the early to mid 20th century. The establishment of homes, businesses and recreation areas in the mill village was a significant factor in the development of the West Durham, especially the Ninth Street business district and the Old West Durham Neighborhood. Erwin Cotton Mills Company Mill No. 1 Headquarters Building is on the National Register of Historic Places and the mill village of West Durham is a National Historic District. An apartment complex, office building and shopping center of the same name that are built on the original site also commemorate the factory.

== Background ==
The idea of the Erwin Mill was rooted in the successful textile industry in New England and the Northeast. In the early 1800s, industrialists such as Samuel Slater brought the ideas behind cotton-spinning machines to the United States from England, which allowed the production of textiles on a mass scale. Even though northern cities such as Lowell, Massachusetts were home to the first large textile mills in the 1830s, industrialization and large textile mills reached Southern cities after the Civil War.

In the post-war South, subsistence agriculture and the plantation system yielded to more commercialized agriculture, which required less manpower, freeing labor to work in the mills. Many subsistence and yeoman farming families who faced hard times flocked to urban centers in search of work. The construction of complex railroad networks happened simultaneously to the growth of southern cities, making them prime candidates to become centers of industrialization. The growth of cities and infrastructure in the South allowed entrepreneurs open large factories, which took advantage of cheap labor that was rarely under the influence of a union. Many opened textile factories to manufacture the cotton crop that the Southern states had produced for years. By the turn of the century, much of the textile industry had shifted from the Northeastern United States to the South. In 1900, there were 177 mills in North Carolina alone. The industry reached Durham in the 1880s, when Durham businessman Julian Carr opened the Durham Cotton Manufacturing Company to manufacture cloth bags for tobacco. The mill's early success confirmed that a textile mill located in Durham or the surrounding area could be successful.

== Beginnings ==
The Duke family, which had been successful in starting the American Tobacco Company, looked to diversify their interests beyond the tobacco industry and raised $125,000 of start-up funds to build the factory. Benjamin Duke wanted to build the mill in North Carolina, offering that the central part of the state was "the most healthful locality in the South." Duke elected to construct the mills in West Durham, North Carolina, at the modern intersection of Main and Ninth Streets. Duke was traveling when his lawyers inquired about a name for the mills, so without any way to immediately contact Duke, the lawyers declared the mills to be named after the manager Duke had appointed to be in charge of the plant, William H. Erwin. In 1892, construction began on Mill No.1. Erwin Cotton Mills showcased its success when it made a profit soon after it opened, even during a recession in 1893. In fact, the mill was so successful in its first few years of operation that production expanded to include denims. In 1896, the mill became one of the state's largest textile mills, employing 1,000 workers and doubling its production in just four years.

== Growth ==
=== Early years ===
Erwin continued to diversify the mill's production and found new buyers across the world for the factory's finished products. The mill expanded its production to include sheets, muslins and denim, among other goods. Because the mill was producing more finished products, capital gains increased to more than seven million dollars of stock. With his operation and profits growing rapidly, Erwin decided to open additional mills, in Erwin, North Carolina and Cooleemee, North Carolina in 1902 and 1905.

=== Market expansion ===
At the beginning of the 20th century the mill faced growing pains and was forced to change its selling strategies and the way it handled its relations with employees to succeed. Although the market price of textiles rose in the early 1900s, demand was not as strong as it had been during the mill's infant years, but Duke and Erwin worked tirelessly to find buyers overseas, especially in Asia. Erwin and Duke worked together with the British-American Tobacco Company to break into the Asian market, however Erwin reported that the mill still was having "strenuous times." It is possible that the denims the mill sent to China were the first to reach the country, which had practiced isolationism for much of the 1800s. One of the reasons why the mill was so successful in its early years was because it employed poor workers in the post-war south who worked for extremely low wages in the recession years of the 1890s. Most men earned a maximum of $2.50 per day, while women and children earned even less. This helped the mill keep costs down and profits up, even while production increased. But, at the turn of the century, when the country emerged from the Panic of 1893, workers began to expect higher pay and fewer hours. Thus, Erwin and his management team decided to change conditions at the factory in order to create a better atmosphere for current and future employees. For example, Erwin Mills gave its employees a 40-hour workweek, which decreased the number of hours worked per week by almost 35 percent. Favorable economic conditions during the 1910s allowed the mill to have its most successful decade since its inception. Stock rose to more than $150 a share and Erwin wrote to Duke in 1913 that he was aspiring to reach a profit of $2,000,000 that year. Duke was so pleased with Erwin's management that he authorized Erwin's salary to be increased by $5,000 the same year. Economists and entrepreneurs from all over the United States recognized the mill's renowned prosperity. Economist Frederick L. Baily said, "of all the mills in the south, the Erwin Cotton Mills Company has a place entirely by itself." Combined with the mills in Erwin and Coleemee, Erwin's Durham operation had become a major textile producer in North Carolina and the southern United States.

=== Physical expansion ===
A second mill was constructed at the West Durham plant in 1925, which expanded and deepened Erwin Mills' impact and presence in Durham. Durham leaders wanted to prevent West Durham from incorporating into its own city, to leave open the possibility expanding city limits to include prosperous mill town. However, Erwin wanted West Durham to maintain its hegemony as its own village, separate from the city of Durham. When Durham leaders and Erwin came to an agreement that allowed West Durham to remain an independent mill village, Erwin began construction of a second mill. The 35,000 square foot mill cost $2,500,000 to build and had 35,000 spindles and 1,200 looms. The mill was named Mill No. 4 because two other mills were already operating outside of Durham County.

=== Great Depression and World War II ===
Although the plant's growth was staggered in the mid-20th century, the management of Erwin Mills continued profit and expand, even through the Great Depression. The mill was largely unaffected compared to other businesses in the country because of an established system that had produced a consistent profit prior to the Great Depression. The mill did not do particularly well when the country faced hard times from 1929 to 1938, but thousands of workers kept their jobs and were paid at least 25 cents an hour. Erwin became ill and died in 1932 and was succeeded by KP Lewis. Lewis steered the mill through the Depression and the looming threat of unionization, without damaging the mill's profitability. Some reports indicate that 1938 was the final year that the mills had an annual loss until 1975. Lewis oversaw the acquisition of other mills in the south that were brought under the Erwin name, including mills in Stonewall, Mississippi and Wake County, North Carolina. World War II allowed the mill to fully emerge from the Depression, as it produced textiles in support of the war overseas and in return received government money for its products. However, the mill was losing control over the surrounding village. In the 1930s, it was incorporated into the city of Durham and in the early 1940s, Erwin Mills began selling the houses it had built north of the factory. This hinted at the mill's decline as other employers in the city grew, such as Watts Hospital and Duke University.

== Effects on the development of West Durham ==
The mill did not only serve as a workplace for its employees, it also led the development of the surrounding land, which was used to house and entertain employees and their families. When textile mills opened in the South in the late 1800s and early 1900s, mill towns sprouted up around the growing textile mills. They were tight-knit communities made up of textile workers, their families and sometimes management. Mill village residents usually did not leave the area around the factory, because textile companies provided food, goods and other necessities. The village at Erwin Mill was no different. The company built houses alongside the mill in the early 1890s and by the end of the 19th century hundreds of workers lived in single-family homes around the mill.

=== Construction of the Mill Village ===
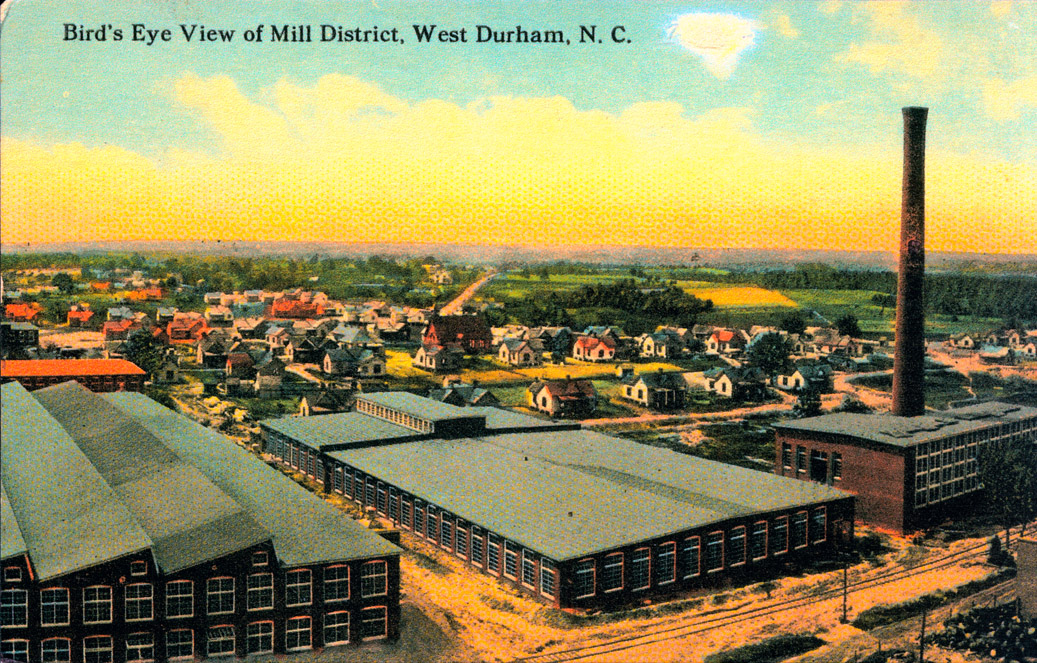
Erwin Mill No.1 and the mill village of West Durham in the 1910s.

Historian William Kenneth Boyd attributes the rise of West Durham to the mill, as the village began to grow within the first few years of operation when there were 375 employees in late mid-1890s. This number grew proportionately when the number of employees at the plant rose in the 1900s. Erwin Mills constructed houses for its employees, which at one point included women and children. Housing needs continued to grow in the 20th century and additional houses were built in the area south of the mill that is now the Central Campus of Duke University. E.K Powe, a manager of the mill, even purchased houses directly from Duke located along Yearby Avenue in the 1920s. Today, the neighborhoods to the west and north of the former mill are mainly residential, harboring the former homes of mill workers.

=== Company control of the mill ===
The mill village also provided entertainment, education and recreation to the workers and their families. The Erwin Auditorium was built in 1922 for performances and other events. A zoo and playground were built in the early 20th century to entertain the children of the mill workers after child labor was outlawed in 1913. A small library opened during the 1900s on the corner of Ninth and Main streets. Erwin also provided a limited education to mill employees and donated money a number of local charities. The company store, a staple of Southern cotton mills, provided residents with food, medicine and other basic goods. When mill workers died, most were buried in the nearby Cedar Hill Cemetery. Erwin's rule over the mill town earned him the name "Pa Erwin," as he was very involved in the lives of his workers. But, in addition to keeping a close eye on his workers, he encouraged them to follow his Christian views, supporting local churches to presumably increase their popularity among the mill's workers and banning alcohol in the mill village. Erwin and the mill's first employees formed the West Durham Episcopal Mission in 1894, but as the mill village grew, Erwin saw the need for an official Episcopalian church. In 1908, Erwin funded the construction of a new church along Main Street that would become St. Joseph's Episcopal Church, which today is one of Durham's oldest Episcopalian congregations. He donated all proceeds that would have gone toward tobacco, alcohol and soft drinks to the church. Other area churches served workers who belonged to other denominations. Former worker Zeb Stone told Duke history student Richard C. Franck in 1975 that, "everything up here, just about, was run and controlled by the company." The influx in population in West Durham led to the development of the Ninth Street business district, with stores such as McDonald's Drug store and lunch counter serving as a place of gathering for mill workers in the evenings. Eventually, the left side of the street opposite the mill was dotted with other shops and eateries. The addition of these services and amenities to the houses surrounding the mill transformed the village into a coherent community of workers and their families that was the foundation for what would become the Old West End neighborhood in Durham. When Erwin Mills began to sell houses to its workers and to the public, a new population of non-mill workers moved into the area, which diversified the Old West Durham neighborhood and allowed it to grow into its present state.

== Working conditions ==
Working conditions at the mill improved with time, because of experienced management and federal worker's rights legislation. Erwin and Duke originally elected to operate the mill in the South even though most textile mills in the late 1800s were located in the Northeast, because labor in the post-war South was relatively cheap. Employees were originally paid 30 cents an hour, but that number fell to 25 cents shortly after, prompting the mill's first strike. Child labor was also present, as boys as young as ten years old toiled at the mill until the practice was banned in 1913. In the early 20th century, O.C. Crabtree worked 66 hours a week at the age of 12. A 40-hour workweek was instated for all workers at the turn of the century and would remain a staple at the mill until its closure in the 1980s. Workers only worked limited hours at night and Federal legislation in 1913 limited night work to only two hours. Additionally, Erwin instituted a profit sharing and bonus program for all mill workers, something that was rare at a textile mill, especially in the South. Employees at the mill approved of Erwin's supervision and many knew him on a personal level, as he visited all areas of the factory on a daily or weekly basis. He also funded and threw huge celebrations for the workers on holidays, particularly on July 4. The ability of mill's management to keep workers happy was a major factor in holding the community of West Durham together because it ensured that workers had long careers at the mill, with their families residing in the mill town for many years.

== Unionization ==
New Deal legislation during the Great Depression not only improved worker's rights even further, but also gave mill workers the right to organize. The legislation set forth a 25-cent minimum wage and put the 40-hour workweek into law. While this federal legislation "was something new for the textile industry," it had been a company policy for years. Even though conditions and pay at the factory were fairly better than other factories, the Great Depression inspired workers to fight for better wages and conditions. Erwin Mills' workers followed suit of other industries, which had organized during the past 15 years. But President KP Lewis, who had replaced Erwin in 1932, furiously refused to recognize the union. He was worried about the effects it would have on profits and shareholders. Tensions began to boil between management and employees. Erwin Mills workers participated in a large strike that took place throughout the south in September 1934, joining more than 5000 other Durham area factory workers to protest in the center of town. This strike was the first of a series of protests and walkouts that would at times paralyze the plant and pit management against thousands of workers.

=== The union movement grows ===
Eventually Lewis and the other management team members became open to the idea of a union at the mill, which was aided by the creation National Labor Relations Board and the passing of the Wagner Act. The Wagner Act prevented management at workplaces around the United States interfering with unions. The Textile Workers Organizing Committee was the most prominent union at the West Durham mills and had a presence at the other mill locations in North Carolina. This was the first union at mill in its more than 40 years of existence. The organization of workers led to friction between workers and management in the early 1940s. A new labor agreement was signed just prior to World War II on August 22, 1941, that officially recognized the union and stabilized wages for employees. But, the agreement expired in 1943 and the two sides were unable to come to an agreement in 1945 after the union workers released a set of demands that "no [other] southern cotton mill grant[ed]" at the time. Management originally refused to agree to the demands, which included paid holidays, a lunch break and having a person independent of the mill devise the labor agreement. It claimed that the mill could not maintain its profitability if it met the demands of workers and cited the fair treatment it had given them in the past, denying that they violated labor laws. Former Duke University economics professor Frank DeVyver joined management in 1943 specifically to deal with labor disputes and worked out a compromise that satisfied the workers, giving them benefits such as vacation time, lunch breaks and an hourly wage of 65 cents. This was a radical and new type of labor agreement, as few other southern textile mills granted these rights to their workers, especially a 40-minute lunch break. Conditions at the mill had come a long way from the handful of small children who were toiling in the mill 40 years prior.

== Later years ==
The dynasty Erwin established in 1893 began to crumble in 1953 when Abney Mills acquired the Erwin Mill No. 1 and Erwin Mill No. 2 from the Duke family. Production and life at the mill remained the same as the city of Durham and Duke University sprouted up around aging factory. Employees continued to emerge victorious in the labor battle, signing new labor agreements in both 1956 and 1957, which prolonged the generous rights granted to workers in the prior decade. In 1962, the mill changed hands once again after Burlington Industries of Greensboro, North Carolina bought the mill and cut production in half. Working conditions, which had historically been above average, deteriorated during this period and were highlighted in a Duke Chronicle article that went as far as comparing the mill to a "concentration camp." Burlington Industries had done little to spur production at the mill, and there was little reason to, as modern factories in Asia and Central America were cheaper to operate and therefore stole business than traditional textile mills. Burlington did, however, spend millions of dollars to make improvements to both of the mills. The final year of textile production at the original Erwin Mill was in 1986, after 103 years of operation.
