= Angier Biddle Duke =

American diplomat (1915–1995)

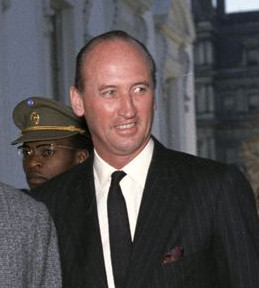
- Duke in 1962

10th and 13th Chief of Protocol of the United States
- In office January 24, 1961 – January 20, 1965
- President: John F. Kennedy; Lyndon B. Johnson
- Preceded by: Wiley T. Buchanan, Jr.
- Succeeded by: Lloyd Nelson Hand
- In office April 1, 1968 – September 26, 1968
- President: Lyndon B. Johnson
- Preceded by: James W. Symington
- Succeeded by: Tyler Abell

United States Ambassador to Morocco
- In office December 20, 1979 – February 28, 1981
- Preceded by: Richard B. Parker
- Succeeded by: Joseph Verner Reed, Jr.

United States Ambassador to Denmark
- In office October 3, 1968 – May 1, 1969
- Preceded by: Katharine Elkus White
- Succeeded by: Guilford Dudley Jr.

51st United States Ambassador to Spain
- In office April 1, 1965 – March 30, 1968
- Preceded by: Robert F. Woodward
- Succeeded by: Robert F. Wagner

United States Ambassador to El Salvador
- In office June 5, 1952 – May 21, 1953
- Preceded by: George P. Shaw
- Succeeded by: Michael J. McDermott

Personal details
- Born: November 30, 1915 New York City, U.S.
- Died: April 29, 1995 (aged 79) Southampton, New York, U.S.
- Resting place: Maplewood Cemetery
- Party: Democratic Party
- Spouses: Priscilla St. George (m. 1936; div. 1940) Margaret Screven White (m. 1940; div. 1952) Maria-Luisa de Arana (m. 1952; died 1961) Robin Chandler Lynn (m. 1962)
- Parents: Angier Buchanan Duke; Cordelia Drexel Biddle
- Education: St. Paul's School; Yale University
- Occupation: Diplomat

Military service
- Branch/service: United States Army Air Forces
- Years of service: 1940-1945
- Rank: Major
- Battles/wars: World War II

Angier Biddle Duke (November 30, 1915 – April 29, 1995) was an American diplomat who served as Chief of Protocol of the United States in the 1960s. Before that, at the age of 36, he became the youngest American ambassador in history when he was appointed to be the U.S. Ambassador to El Salvador.

== Early life ==
Duke was born in New York City. His father was Angier Buchanan Duke (1884–1923) and his mother was Cordelia Drexel Biddle, later Cordelia Biddle Robertson. Angier Buchanan Duke was an heir to the American Tobacco Company fortune while Cordelia Drexel Biddle was a member of the Biddle family who were prominent in business, political and cultural affairs in Philadelphia. Angier Biddle Duke's only sibling was Anthony Drexel Duke (1918–2014). After separating in 1918, Duke's parents divorced in 1921.

His paternal grandfather was Benjamin Newton Duke (1855–1929), a major benefactor of Duke University and brother of James Buchanan Duke, himself the father of Doris Duke, Angier's cousin. His maternal grandfather was Anthony Joseph Drexel Biddle, Sr. Through his mother, he was a great-great-grandson of banker Anthony Joseph Drexel.

Duke attended St. Paul's School in Concord, New Hampshire. He dropped out of Yale University in 1936. While at Yale, he became a member of Delta Kappa Epsilon Phi Chapter.

== Career ==
In the late 1930s, Duke became skiing editor for a sports magazine and, by 1940, he enlisted as a private in the United States Army Air Forces. Upon his discharge in 1945, Duke was a major serving in North Africa and Europe. His uncle, Anthony Joseph Drexel Biddle, Jr., was serving as ambassador to most of the governments-in-exile that were occupied by Germany during World War II.

=== Diplomatic career ===
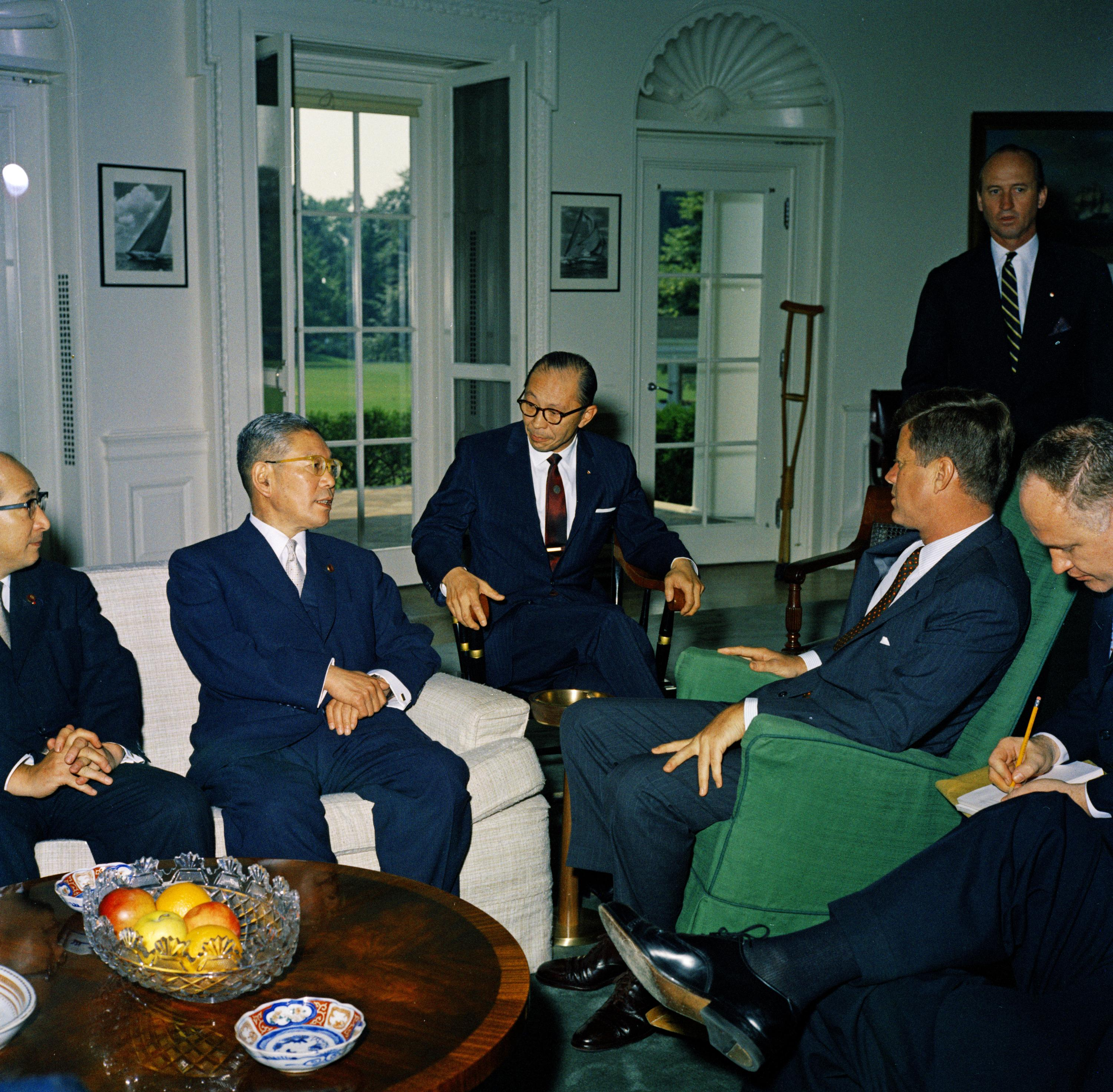
Meeting with the Prime Minister of Japan, Hayato Ikeda. (L-R) Japanese Minister of Foreign Affairs Zentaro Kosaka, Prime Minister Ikeda, Counselor of the Ministry of Foreign Affairs (Interpreter) Toshiro Shimanouchi, President John F. Kennedy, State Department Chief of Protocol Angier Biddle Duke (standing), and interpreter James J. Wickel. Oval Office, White House, Washington, D.C.

In 1949, Duke joined the United States Foreign Service as an assistant in Buenos Aires and subsequently Madrid. From 1952 to 1953, he served as the U.S. Ambassador to El Salvador during the Truman administration and was, aged 36, the youngest ever U.S. Ambassador up to that time.

People thought Angie was just a rich playboy when President Truman appointed him Ambassador to El Salvador. He was 36 years old, the youngest ambassador in United States history, and the Duke name represented entrenched, giant capitalists.

With the Democratic Party out of power in 1953, he left the foreign service and returned to private life. During much of this time he served as President of the International Rescue Commission. Originally a Republican, he later became a Democrat.

In 1960, Duke, a personal friend of Kennedy, was asked to serve as chief of protocol for the U.S. State Department with the rank of ambassador. He held this position until 1965. As a vocal supporter of equal rights, "he resigned from the Metropolitan Club of Washington after it refused to admit black diplomats" in 1961. His most visible task during his term as chief was to supervise the protocol for world leaders who attended the funeral of John F. Kennedy on November 25, 1963.

At the end of his term as chief of protocol, the Johnson administration asked him to serve as U.S. Ambassador to Spain, which he did from 1965 to 1968. He then served as Chief of Protocol a second time, for less than six months, until he was appointed to become the U.S. Ambassador to Denmark. He served in that position for seven months. In 1969, he was awarded an honorary LL.D. degree from Duke University. Following Vice President Hubert Humphrey's defeat by Richard Nixon, and with the Democratic Party again out of power, he was again out of the U.S. Foreign Service. In the early 1970s, he was appointed by Mayor Abraham Beame to serve as Commissioner of the New York City Department of Civic Affairs and Public Events with a staff of 17 until he resigned in 1976 to work for Jimmy Carter's campaign for the presidency.

When Carter defeated Gerald Ford in the 1976 presidential election, the Democrats were again in power, and in 1979 the administration brought him back again to serve as the U.S. Ambassador to Morocco, a position he held until 1981, when he was succeeded by Joseph Verner Reed, Jr. following Ronald Reagan's election to president.

=== Later years ===
Upon his return to the United States, the National Committee on American Foreign Policy awarded him with the inaugural Hans J. Morgenthau Memorial Award "in recognition of his exemplary foreign policy contributions to the United States". From 1992 to 1995, Duke served as the elected president of the Council of American Ambassadors. He was a member of the Sons of the American Revolution. He also served as the chancellor of the Long Island University, Southampton Campus.

After his death, his papers were archived by Duke University in North Carolina.

== Personal life ==
In 1937, he married Priscilla Avenal St. George (1919–1995) at St. Mary's-in-Tuxedo Episcopal Church. She was the daughter of George Baker Bligh St. George and Katharine St. George, a member of the U.S. House of Representatives from New York. Her maternal grandmother, Catherine Delano Collier, was the younger sister of Sara Delano Roosevelt, the mother of President Franklin Delano Roosevelt and her great-grandfather was George Fisher Baker, the financier and philanthropist. Her father was the grandson of Robert St George, himself the son of Sir Richard Bligh St George, 2nd Baronet. Before their divorce in August 1940, they were the parents of:

- Angier "Pony" St. George Duke (1937–2014), who married Mary Ellen Haga in 1973. He was known for infecting Margaret Housen with gonorrhea in 1970. His son, Benjamin Buchanan Duke, married the poker player Annie Duke.

Following their divorce, Priscilla married State Senator Allan A. Ryan, Jr. (1903–1981) in 1941. In November 1940, the 26-year-old Duke married the 34-year-old Margaret Screven White immediately after her divorce from J. M. Tuck. Margaret had also been married to Fitzhugh White and was the daughter of Franklin Buchanan Screven, great-granddaughter of Admiral Franklin Screven, commander of the Confederate USS Merrimack, and a descendant of Thomas McKean, a signer of the Declaration of Independence.

They divorced in 1952, the same year Duke married Maria-Luisa de Arana of Spain. She was the daughter of Isabella de Zurita and Dario de Arana, and the granddaughter of the 10th Marquis de Campo Real, members of the Basque nobility of Bilbao. His third wife died in a plane crash in 1961.

- Maria-Luisa Duke (b. 1954),
- Drexel Dario Duke (b. 1957).

In 1962, he married Robin Chandler Lynn (1923–2016), who served as the United States Ambassador to Norway during the Clinton administration. She had previously been married to Jeffrey Lynn, the actor and film producer, and was the daughter of Richard Edgar and Esther Chandler Tippett. They lived together at The River House on 52nd Street in New York City. Robin and Angier remained married until his death in 1995.

- Angier Biddle Duke, Jr. (b. 1963)

Duke died at the age of 79, from being struck by a car while rollerblading.

Diplomatic posts
Preceded by George P. Shaw	United States Ambassador to El Salvador; 1952–1953	Succeeded by Michael J. McDermott
Preceded by Robert F. Woodward	United States Ambassador to Spain; 1965–1968	Succeeded by Frank E. McKinney
Preceded by Katharine Elkus White	United States Ambassador to Denmark; 1968–1969	Succeeded by Guilford Dudley Jr.
Preceded by Richard B. Parker	United States Ambassador to Morocco; 1979–1981	Succeeded by Joseph Verner Reed, Jr.
