= Brodie Duke =

American tobacco entrepreneur

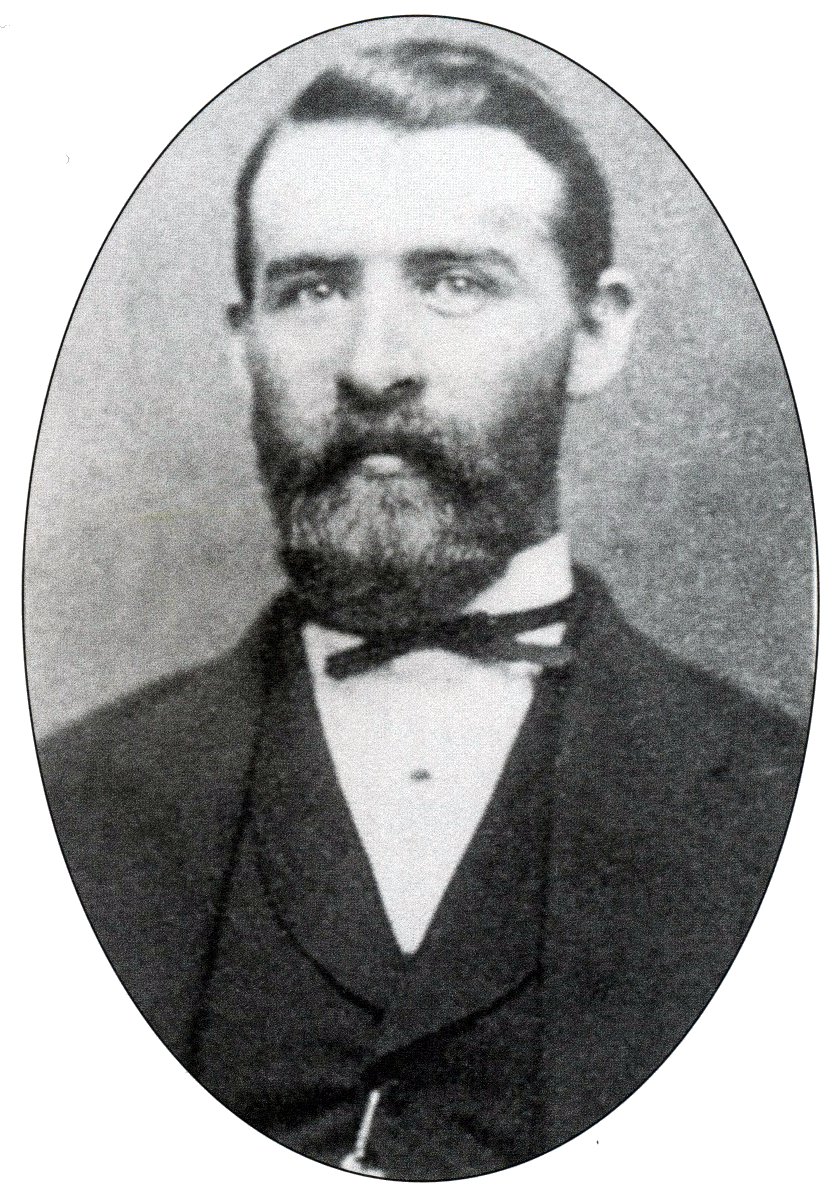
- Born: Brodie Leonidas Duke; September 17, 1846; Orange County, North Carolina, U.S.
- Died: February 2, 1919 (aged 72); Durham, North Carolina, U.S.
- Occupation: Tobacco entrepreneur
- Years active: 1869–1893
- Known for: Semper Idem; Duke of Durham; W. Duke, Sons & Co.
- Parents: Washington Duke (father); Mary Caroline Clinton (mother)
- Relatives: James Buchanan Duke (half-brother); Benjamin Newton Duke (half-brother)

Brodie Leonidas Duke (September 17, 1846 – February 2, 1919) was an American entrepreneur, often credited with starting the tobacco manufacturing industry in Durham, North Carolina. Founder of Semper Idem, and co-founder of W. Duke, Sons & Co., Brodie produced and sold tobacco products across North Carolina for over 20 years. He mainly worked out of his property around Downtown Durham, including from his famous warehouse, the Brodie Duke Warehouse.

== Early life ==
Brodie Duke was born in 1846, to Washington Duke and Mary Caroline Clinton two years after their first child, Sidney Taylor Duke. Just one year after Brodie's birth, his mother died. Five years later, his father remarried to Artelia Roney, from Alamance County, North Carolina. Washington and Artelia had three children, Mary Elizabeth Duke, Benjamin Newton Duke, and James Buchanan Duke. In 1858, Sidney caught typhoid fever and died at age 14. Days later, Artelia, who had been caring for Sidney, fell ill and died as well.

Along with his father, Brodie volunteered for military service in the Civil War, and served as a guard.

== Career ==
The Duke family owned and ran a 72-acre farm in what is Durham County today. Brodie was the first of the family to move away, relocating to Durham. He purchased a two-level space, living on the upper level while selling tobacco from the lower level. After a few years, the rest of the Dukes moved to Durham. At this time, Washington Duke built a split warehouse to share with Brodie, and the two held an agreement by which each would sell the other's products.

Eventually, Brodie built his warehouse and co-founded W. Duke, Sons & Co. with his father, half-brothers, and a family business partner, George Washington Watts. Despite the rest of the Duke family's affection towards Watts, Brodie despised him. So much so, that he bought three pieces of land in Durham, and named the streets so that they read "Washington, Hated, Watts" from East to West. In 1902, however, Hated Street was renamed Gregson Street after Amos Gregson, a Durham minister.

Built around 1878, the Brodie Duke Warehouse is one of the oldest tobacco-related buildings in Durham. It remained operational through the mid-twentieth century. In 2000, educational testing company, Measurement Incorporated purchased the warehouse and renovated it.

== Alcoholism ==
When he first moved away from his family and started his business in Durham, Brodie developed an addiction to alcohol. In the early 1890s, he traveled to Illinois to receive the Keeley Cure for his alcoholism. He returned to North Carolina completely sober, but less than three years later he declared bankruptcy. The mills were taken over by Benjamin, and Brodie returned to his alcoholic tendencies.
