= Washington Duke =

Confederate Navy officer, businessman, philanthropist and tobacco industry executive

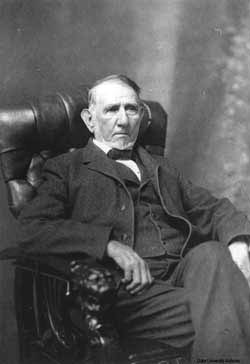
- Born: Washington Duke; December 18, 1820; Orange County, North Carolina, U.S.
- Died: May 8, 1905 (aged 84); Durham, North Carolina, U.S.
- Occupations: Farmer, entrepreneur
- Known for: Namesake of Duke University; Founder of the tobacco manufacturer W. Duke, Sons & Co.
- Spouses: Mary Caroline Clinton (1842–1847) Artelia Roney (1852–1858)
- Children: Sidney Taylor (1844–1858); Brodie Leonidas (1846–1919); Mary Elizabeth (1853–1893); Benjamin Newton (1855–1929); James Buchanan (1856–1925)
- Parent(s): Taylor Duke (1770-1847); Dicey Jones Duke (1786-1860)
- Military career
- Allegiance: Confederate States
- Branch: Confederate States Navy
- Service years: 1862–1865

Signature
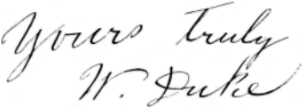

Washington Duke (December 18, 1820 – May 8, 1905) was an American tobacco industrialist and philanthropist. During the American Civil War he enlisted in the Confederate States Navy. In 1865, Duke founded the W. Duke, Sons & Co., a tobacco manufacturer that would be merged with other companies to form conglomerate American Tobacco Company in 1890.

== Early life and Civil War ==
Washington Duke was born on December 18, 1820, in eastern Orange County, North Carolina, in what is today the township of Bahama in Durham County. The eighth of ten children of Taylor Duke (c. 1770 – 1830) and Dicey Jones (born c. 1780), Washington worked as a tenant farmer until he married Mary Caroline Clinton (1825–1847) in 1842. When they married, his father-in-law gave the couple 72 acres of land in present-day Durham County, where he began his career as a subsistence farmer. The couple had two sons: Sidney Taylor Duke (1844–1858), and Brodie Leonidas Duke (1846–1919). Mary Duke died in 1847 at the age of 22.

In 1852, Duke built a homestead for his second wife, Artelia Roney (1829–1858), who was from Alamance County, North Carolina. It still exists. Artelia gave birth to three children between 1853 and 1856: daughter Mary Elizabeth Duke (1853–1899), and sons Benjamin Newton Duke and James Buchanan Duke (the latter more commonly known as "Buck"). In 1858, oldest son Sidney caught typhoid fever and died. Artelia, who had been caring for Sidney, also succumbed to the illness ten days later.

Very little is known about Duke's antebellum views on politics. It is known that Duke kept one woman, named Caroline, as a slave, and that he hired out the labor of another slave from his neighbors to work on his farm.

At the outbreak of the American Civil War, Duke was 40 years old, too old for the initial conscription into service for the Confederacy. However, the second Confederate Conscription Act passed in September 1862 increased the draft-eligible age to 45. Duke, aware that he would soon be called into military service, held a sale at his home on October 20, 1863, to sell the entirety of his farm equipment. He enlisted in the Confederate navy, and served in Charleston, South Carolina, and Richmond, Virginia, until his capture by Union forces in April 1865. After a brief stint in a Federal prison, he was paroled and was sent by ship to New Bern, North Carolina, and from there, walked 134 miles (216 km) back to his homestead.

== Tobacco career ==
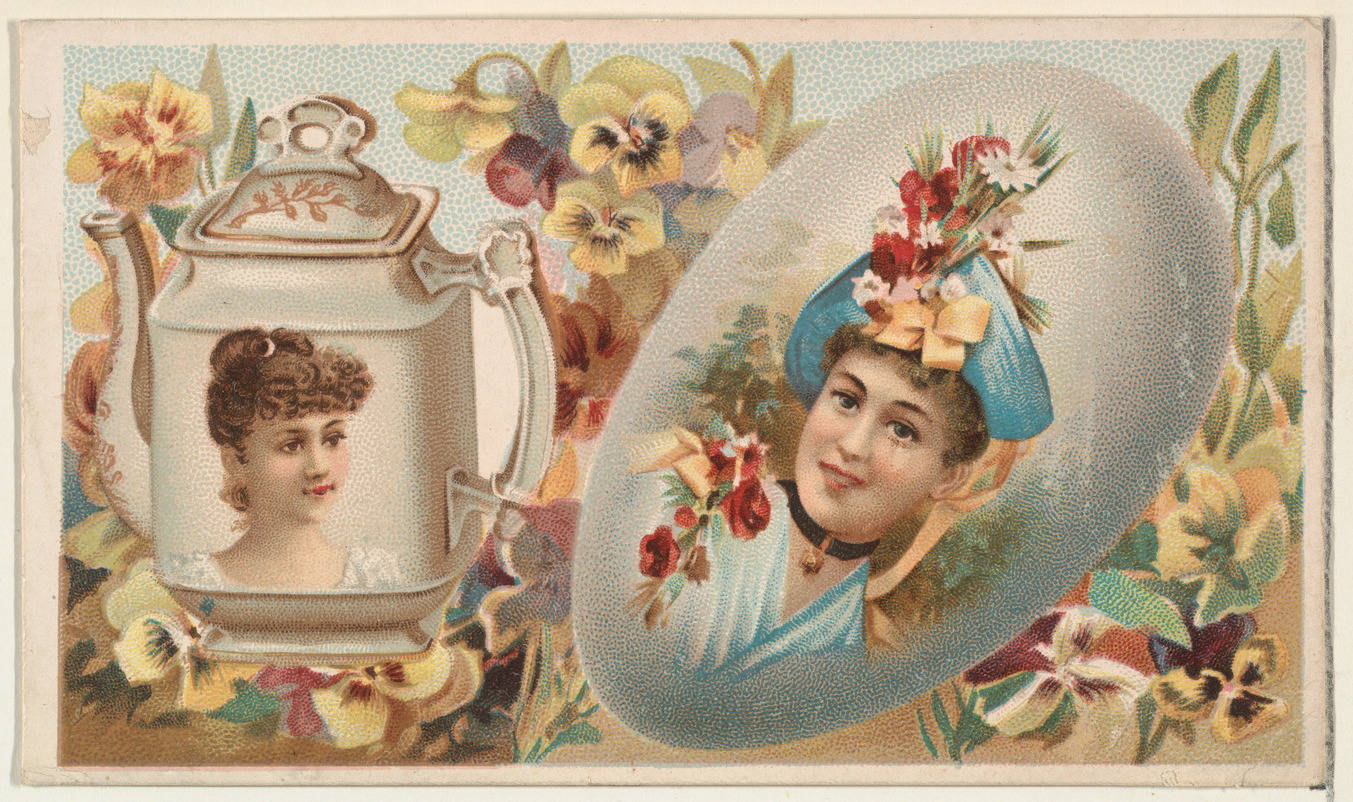
Card created by Donaldson Brothers, from the Miniature Novelties series issued by Duke Sons & Co. to promote Honest Long Cut Tobacco (c. 1890)

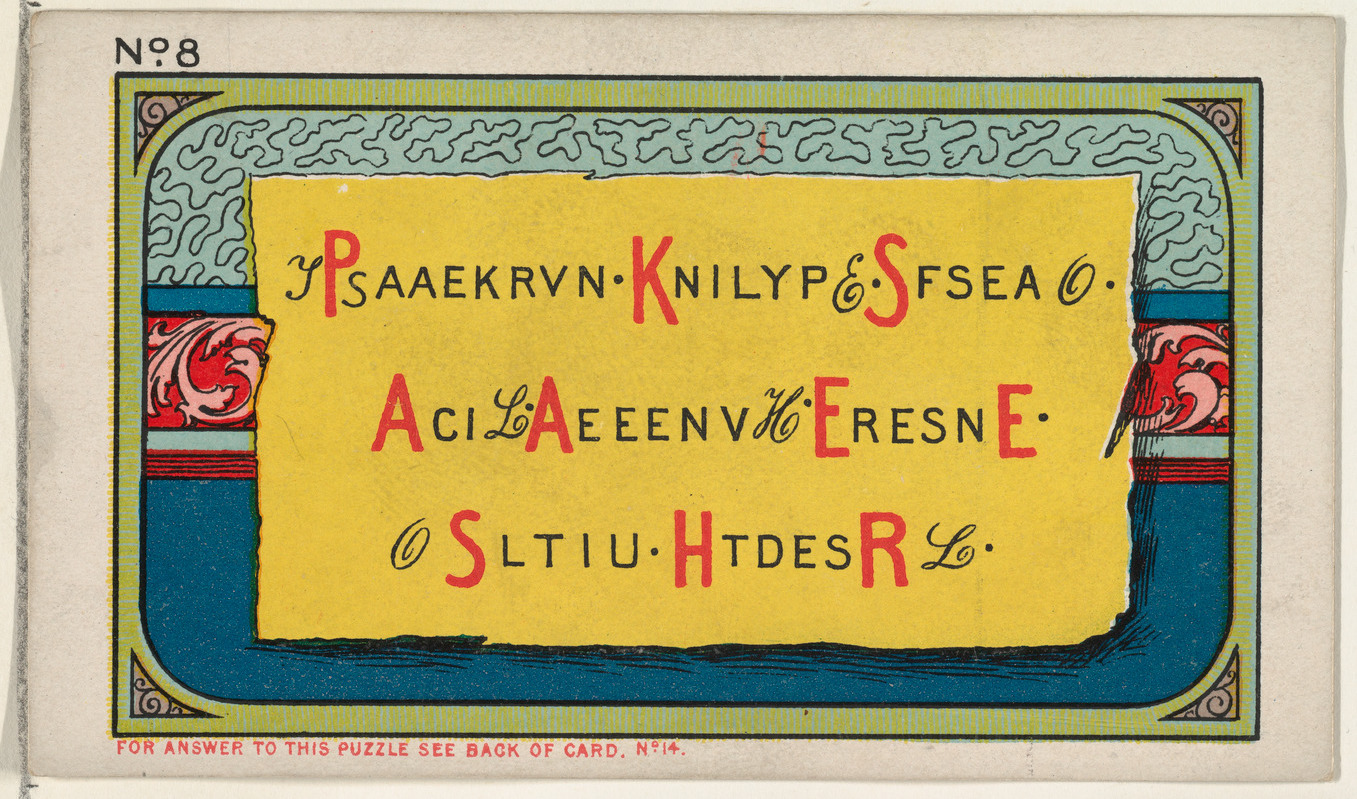
Puzzle Card Number 8, The Cryptogram Puzzle, from the Jokes series (N118) issued by Duke Sons & Co. to promote Honest Long Cut Tobacco (c. 1890)

After the war, Duke stopped farming in order to focus on manufacturing tobacco products. In 1865, using a converted corn crib as a factory, Duke started his first company, W. Duke and Sons, and began production of pipe tobacco under the brand name Pro Bono Publico (For the Public Good). According to Duke, he, along with his sons Ben and Buck, produced between 400 and 500 pounds of pipe tobacco per day. As their company prospered, they built a two-story factory on the homestead in 1869. In 1874, Washington Duke sold his farm and moved his family into the rapidly growing city of Durham. He and his sons built a factory on Main Street, and Washington spent the rest of the decade as a traveling salesman for Pro Bono Publico.

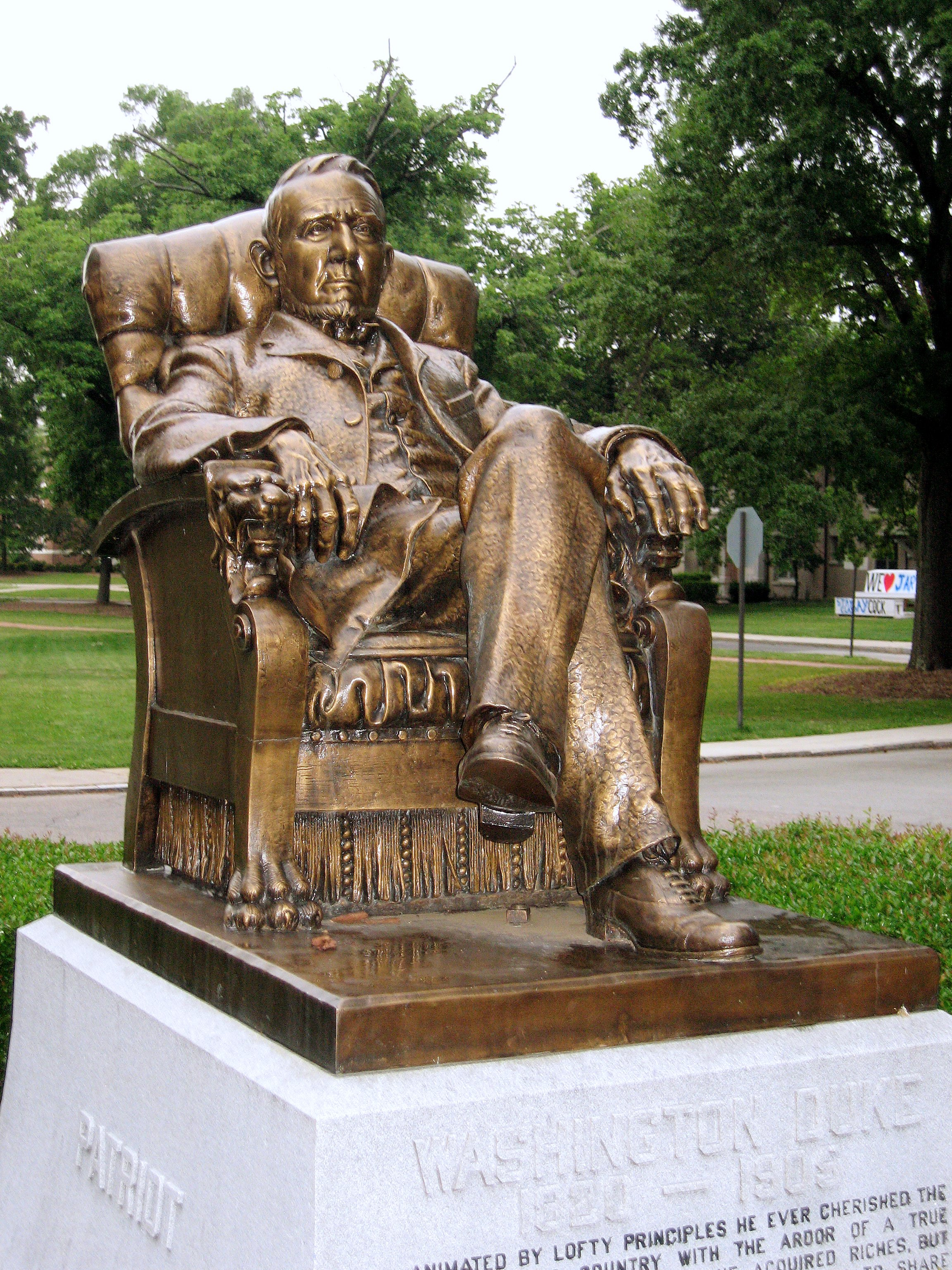
Statue of Washington Duke at Duke University's East Campus, photographed in June 2006

In 1880, at the age of 60, Washington Duke sold his share in the business to Richard Harvey Wright, a farmer from nearby Franklin County. W. Duke, Sons & Co., led by Washington Duke's son Buck as president, eventually achieved great success as a manufacturer of cigarettes. This business became the American Tobacco Company around 1890. Through merging multiple partners and through floating stock, the company became the largest tobacco manufacturer in the world.

After selling his share in the company, Washington Duke became more involved with local politics as a member of the Republican Party, and devoted more time to charitable and philanthropic works. A lifelong member and supporter of the Methodist church, Duke began to support local churches financially, as well as institutions of higher learning. Duke helped to bring Trinity College, a Methodist college, to Durham from Randolph County in 1890. In 1896 while Trinity College was struggling financially, Duke donated $100,000 to the institution on the condition that it "open its doors to women, placing them on equal footing with men." In appreciation, the school offered to rename itself after Duke, which he declined.

Washington Duke died at his home in Durham on May 8, 1905, at the age of 84. Originally interred at Maplewood Cemetery in Durham, he was later re-interred in the Memorial Chapel within the Duke University Chapel. In the 1910s, members of the Duke family began to plan what would become the Duke Endowment of Trinity College. After the indenture for the $40,000,000 was signed in December 1924 by Washington's youngest son, James B. Duke, Trinity College renamed itself Duke University in honor of Washington Duke, in accordance with the terms of the indenture. Today, a statue of Washington Duke sits on Duke University's East Campus.

== Bibliography ==
- Durden, Robert Franklin, The Dukes of Durham: 1865–1929, Duke University Press, 1975. ISBN 0-8223-0330-2.
- North Carolina historic sites.. North Carolina Department of Cultural Resources Office of Archives & History.
