= Benjamin Newton Duke =

American industrialist and philanthropist

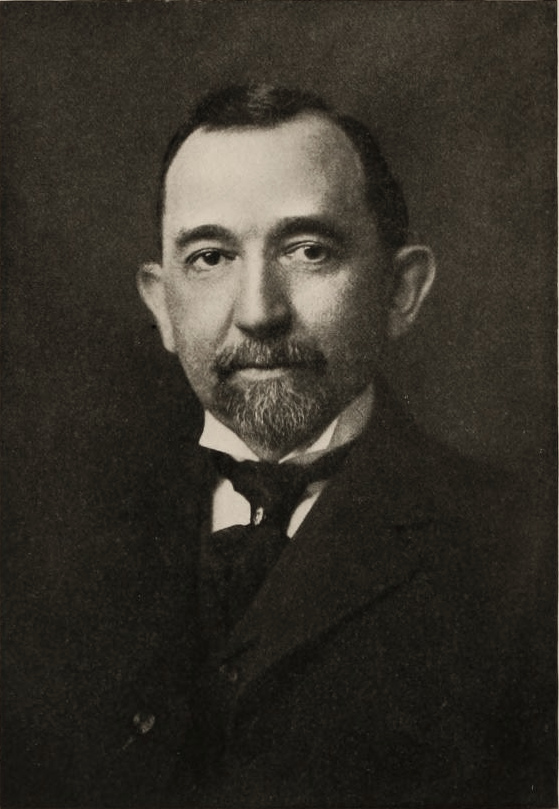
- Born: April 27, 1855; Durham, North Carolina, U.S.
- Died: January 8, 1929 (aged 73); New York City, U.S.
- Occupation: Tobacco entrepreneur
- Known for: American Tobacco Company; Duke Energy
- Spouse: Sarah Pearson Angier
- Children: Mary Lillian Duke; Angier Buchanan Duke
- Parents: Washington Duke (father); Artelia Roney (mother)
- Relatives: James Buchanan Duke (brother); Brodie Duke (half-brother)

Benjamin Newton Duke (April 27, 1855 – January 8, 1929) was an American tobacco, textile and energy industrialist and philanthropist. He served as vice-president at American Tobacco Company, being also founder of Duke Energy.

== Life and career ==
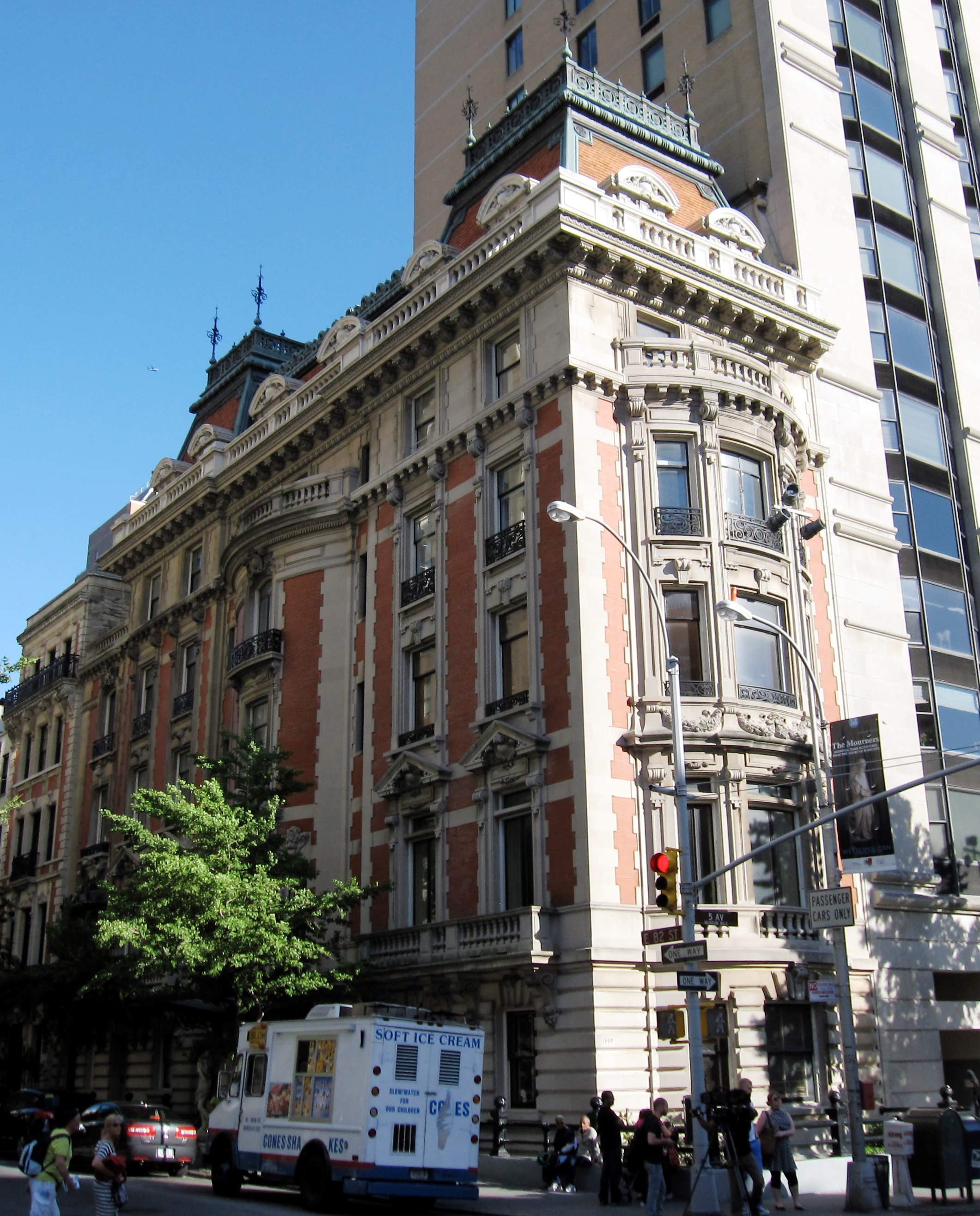
Benjamin N. Duke House in New York City

He was the son of industrialist Washington Duke and his second wife Artelia Roney. His older half-brother was Brodie Leonidas Duke (1846–1919) and his full brother was James Buchanan Duke (1856–1925).

On February 21, 1875, Benjamin Duke married Sarah Pearson Angier, with whom he had a daughter, Mary Lillian Duke, and a son, Angier Buchanan Duke. Portraits of all four members of the family were commissioned from the Spanish painter Joaquín Sorolla in 1911.

He entered his father's tobacco business, and in 1890 became vice-president of the American Tobacco Company. In 1892, the Duke family opened their first textile business in Durham, North Carolina, with Benjamin Duke at its head.

In 1905, he and his brother James founded the Southern Power Company, which later became known as Duke Energy. The company initially supplied electrical power to the Duke textile factory. Within two decades, their power facilities had been greatly expanded, and they were supplying electricity to more than 300 cotton mills and other industrial companies through an electrical grid that supplied cities and towns in the Piedmont Region of North and South Carolina.

In 1908, he had his half brother Brodie declared incompetent and taken to a sanitarium.

Benjamin Duke and his brother were major contributors to the economic growth of the North Carolina economy and would expand into other areas with sizable investments in railroads and banks.

Benjamin was a primary benefactor of Trinity College after it relocated to Durham in 1892. Over the years, he donated substantial funds for improvements, additions, and scholarships. Between 1926 and 1929, he donated approximately $3,000,000 (more than $30,000,000 in 2005 dollars) to twenty-seven different southern institutions of higher learning. Trinity College was eventually renamed Duke University in honor of his family's contributions.

Following his death at his mansion in New York City in 1929, Benjamin Duke's remains were brought back to North Carolina for interment with his father and brother James in Memorial Chapel in the Duke University Chapel on the campus of Duke University.

== Benjamin Newton Duke Scholarship ==
Today, Duke University offers the Benjamin Newton Duke Scholars program in honor of Benjamin Duke's life and philanthropy. "The B.N.," as it is known on Duke's campus, is a full-ride scholarship to Duke University. The B.N. is awarded to students who excel academically and are committed to service and civic engagement. "BNs" must also display empathy, intentionality, imagination, and a commitment to building community. All applying students are considered for the scholarship. In addition to a full scholarship to Duke University and programs within their time at Duke, B.N. Duke Scholars also complete two "summers of service" in which they complete community service projects. One Summer of Service must take place in a low-income community in the Carolinas, and one is carried out in an international location of the scholars' choice.
