= James Buchanan Duke =

Founder of the American Tobacco Company (1856–1925)

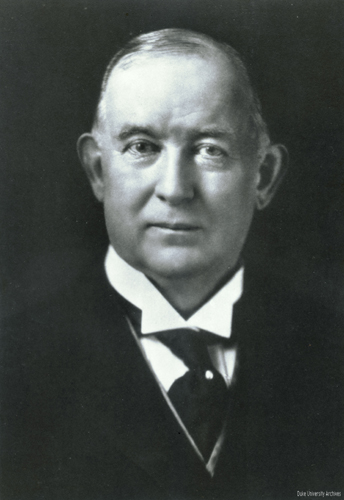
- Born: December 23, 1856; Durham, North Carolina, U.S.
- Died: October 10, 1925 (aged 68); New York City, U.S.
- Resting place: Duke University
- Occupation: Tobacco entrepreneur
- Known for: American Tobacco Company; British American Tobacco; Duke University
- Spouses: Lillian Fletcher McCredy (m. 1904; div. 1906) Nanaline Holt Inman (m. 1907)
- Children: Doris Duke
- Parents: Washington Duke (father); Artelia Roney (mother)
- Relatives: Benjamin Newton Duke (brother); Mary Duke Lyons (sister); Brodie Duke (half-brother)

James Buchanan Duke (December 23, 1856 – October 10, 1925) was an American tobacco and electric power industrialist best known for the invention of modern cigarette manufacture and marketing techniques, and his involvement with Duke University. He was the founder of the American Tobacco Company in 1890.

== Early life ==
James Buchanan Duke, known by the nickname "Buck", was born on December 23, 1856, near Durham, North Carolina, to tobacco manufacturer, philanthropist, and benefactor of Duke University, Washington Duke (1820–1905), and his second wife, Artelia Roney.

== Business career ==
Duke's father, Washington, had owned a tobacco company that his sons James and Benjamin (1855–1929) took over in the 1880s. In 1885, James Buchanan Duke acquired a license to use the first automated cigarette making machine (invented by James Albert Bonsack), and by 1890, Duke supplied 40 percent of the American cigarette market (then known as pre-rolled tobacco). In that year, Duke consolidated control of his four major competitors under one corporate entity, the American Tobacco Company, which was a monopoly as he controlled over 90 percent of the American cigarette market. His aggressive business tactics in cutting prices paid to tobacco farmers directly led to the Black Patch Tobacco Wars in 1906–1908.

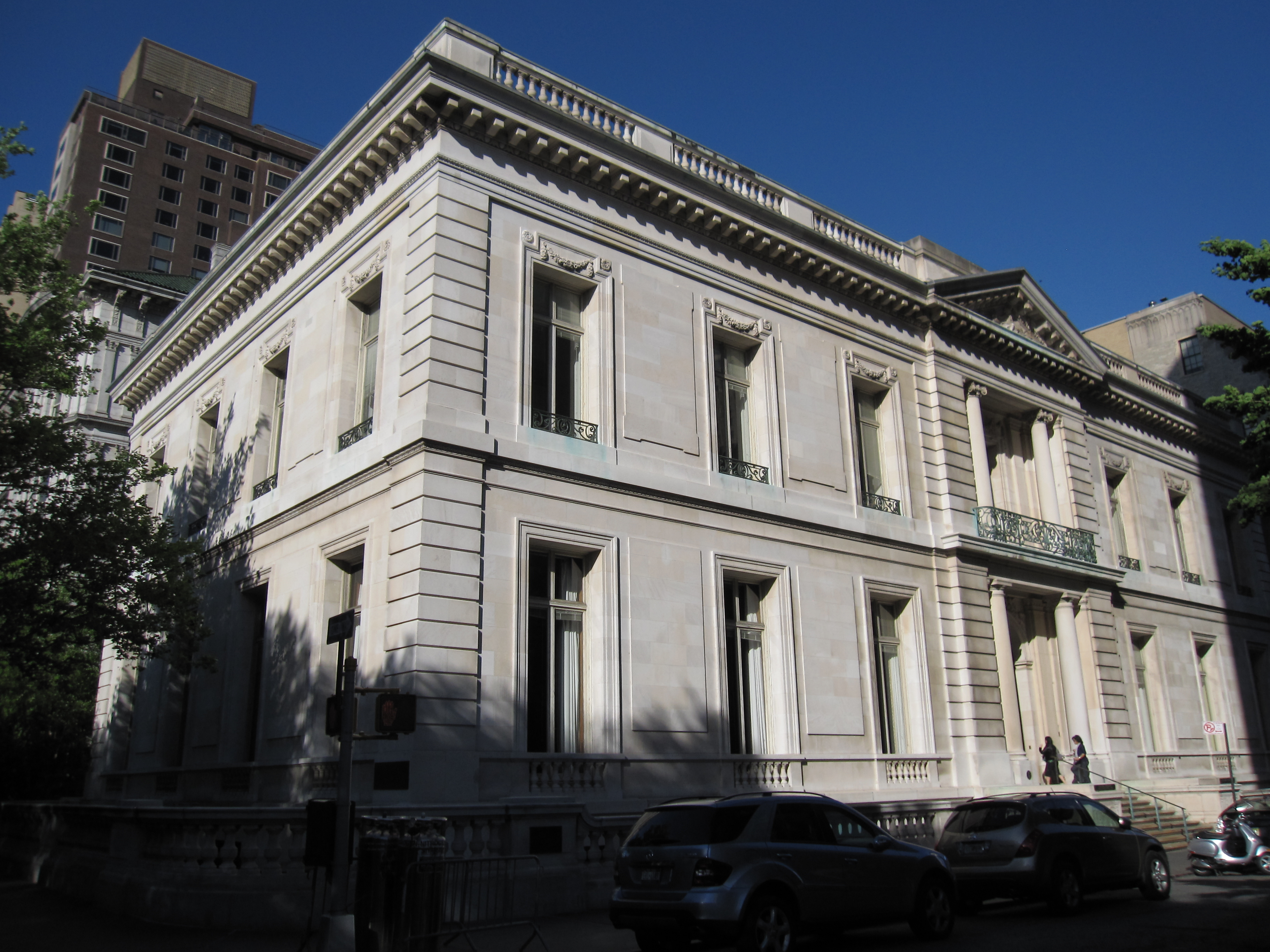
James B. Duke House on Fifth Avenue, New York, as seen in 2010

At the start of the 1900s, Duke tried to conquer the British market as he had done the American, eventually forcing the then divided British manufacturers to merge into the Imperial Tobacco Company of Great Britain and Ireland, Ltd (Imperial Tobacco). After two years of intense competition in Great Britain, Imperial Tobacco took the fight to the U.S. market, forcing American Tobacco to look for a settlement. This resulted in an agreement whereby American Tobacco controlled the American trade, Imperial Tobacco controlled the trade in the British territories, and a third, cooperative venture named the British-American Tobacco Company was set up between the two to control the sale of tobacco in the rest of the world.

During this time, Duke was repeatedly sued by business partners and shareholders. In 1906, the American Tobacco Company was found guilty of antitrust violations, and was ordered to be split into four separate companies: American Tobacco Company, Liggett & Myers, R. J. Reynolds, and the P. Lorillard Company. In 1911, in United States v. American Tobacco Co., the U.S. Supreme Court upheld the order breaking up the American Tobacco Company's monopoly. The company was then divided into several smaller enterprises, of which only the British-American Tobacco Company remained in Duke's control.

In 1892, the Dukes opened their first textile firm in Durham, North Carolina, which was run by Buck's brother Benjamin. At the turn of the century, Buck organized the American Development Company to acquire land and water rights on the Catawba River. In 1904, he established the Catawba Power Company and the following year he and his brother founded the Southern Power Company, which became known as Duke Power, the precursor to the Duke Energy conglomerate. The company supplied electrical power to the Dukes' textile factory and within two decades, their power facilities had been greatly expanded and they were supplying electricity to more than 300 cotton mills and other industrial companies. Duke Power established an electrical grid that supplied cities and towns in the Piedmont Region of North and South Carolina. Buck Steam Station in Rowan County, North Carolina, built in 1926, was named for Duke. Lake James, a power-generating reservoir in Western North Carolina, was created by the company in 1928 and also named in Duke's honor.

== Personal life ==
Duke was married twice, first in 1904 to Lillian Fletcher McCredy (also known as Lillian Nanette Duke). They divorced in 1906 and had no children. In 1907 he married the widow Nanaline Holt Inman, with whom he had his only child, a daughter, Doris, born November 22, 1912. Doris was raised at Duke Farms located in Hillsborough, New Jersey, where her father had worked with landscapers such as James Leal Greenleaf (a member of the firm of Frederick Law Olmsted), and Horatio Buckenham to transform more than 2,000 acres (8 km^{2}) of farmland and woodlots into a landscape containing two conservatories, nine lakes, 35 fountains, 45 buildings, many pieces of sculpture, over 2 miles (3 km) of stone walls and more than 18 miles (29 km) of roadway.

Duke died in New York City on October 10, 1925, and is interred with his father and brother in the Memorial Chapel on the campus of Duke University. He resided at his home, Lynnwood in Charlotte, North Carolina during the last five years of his life. It was listed on the National Register of Historic Places in 1978.

=== Philanthropy and will ===
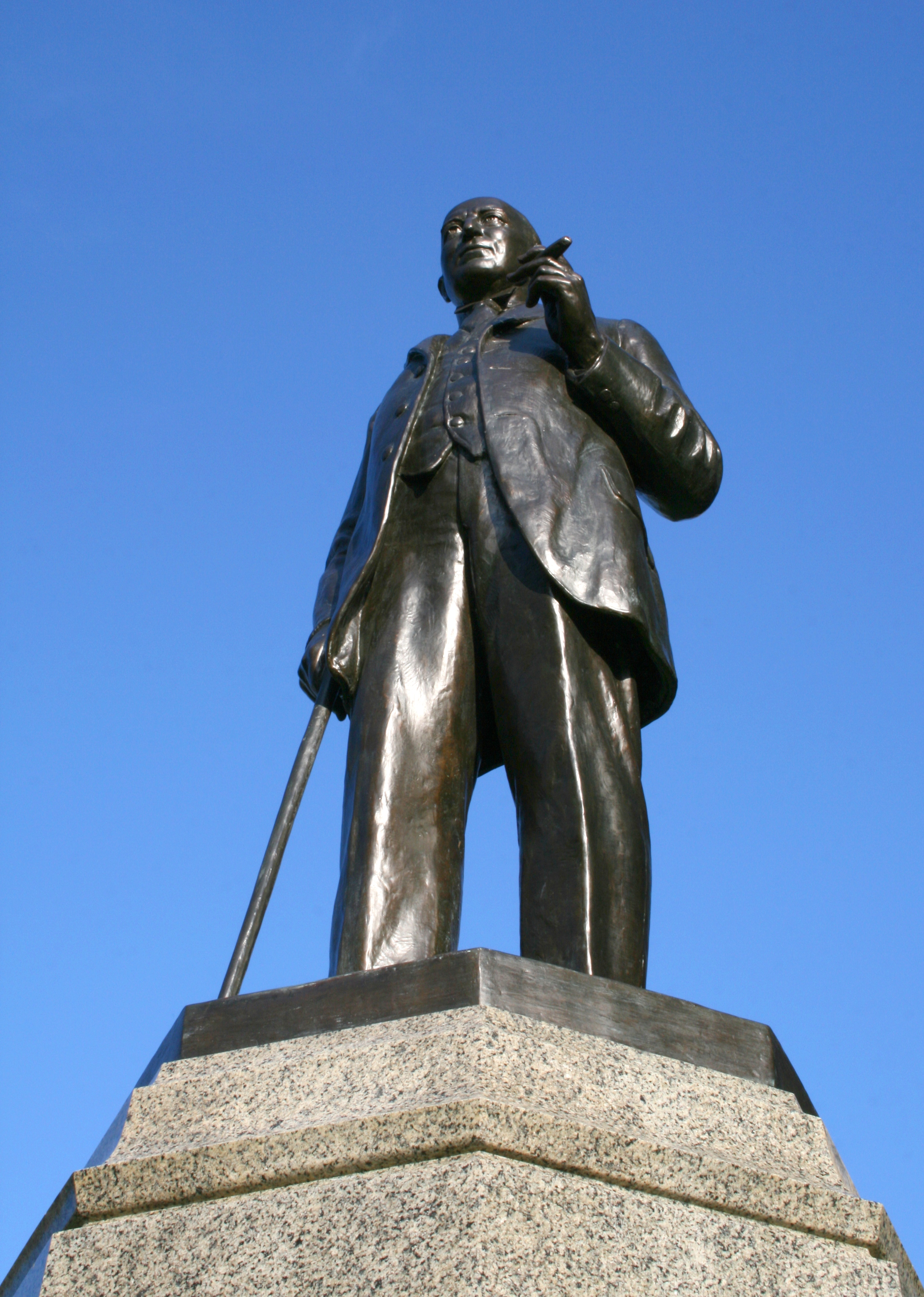
Statue of James B. Duke in front of the West Campus Quad, pictured in July 2008

In December 1924, Duke established The Duke Endowment, a $40 million trust fund (equivalent to $751 million in 2025), some of which was to go to Trinity College, which was renamed Duke University in honor of his father. The James B. Duke Library, the main campus library at Furman University, is also named for him because of his philanthropic relationship with the university.

On his death, he left approximately half of his estate to the Duke Endowment, adding another $67 million (equivalent to $1.23 billion in 2025) to the trust fund. In the indenture of trust, Duke specified that he wanted the endowment to support Duke University, Davidson College, Furman University, and Johnson C. Smith University; non-profit hospitals and children's homes in the two Carolinas; and rural Methodist churches in North Carolina, retired pastors, and their surviving families.

Much of the remainder of Duke's approximately $100 million (equivalent to $1.84 billion in 2025) estate went to his daughter Doris Duke, who became "the richest girl in the world". In 1927, Doris sued her mother for control of the family house in Manhattan and won. Doris also successfully sued for control of the Duke Farms estate. Associating Duke Farms with fond memories of her father, Doris Duke made few major changes to the property other than the adaptation of her father's Conservatory to create Display Gardens in his honor. These gardens showcased her father's extensive sculpture collection and were open to the public from 1964 until closed by her foundation trustees in May 2008.

== See also ==
- List of tobacco-related topics
- James B. Duke House
- James Buchanan Duke House
- Duke Farms
- Rough Point
