= Angier Buchanan Duke =

American socialite (1884–1923)

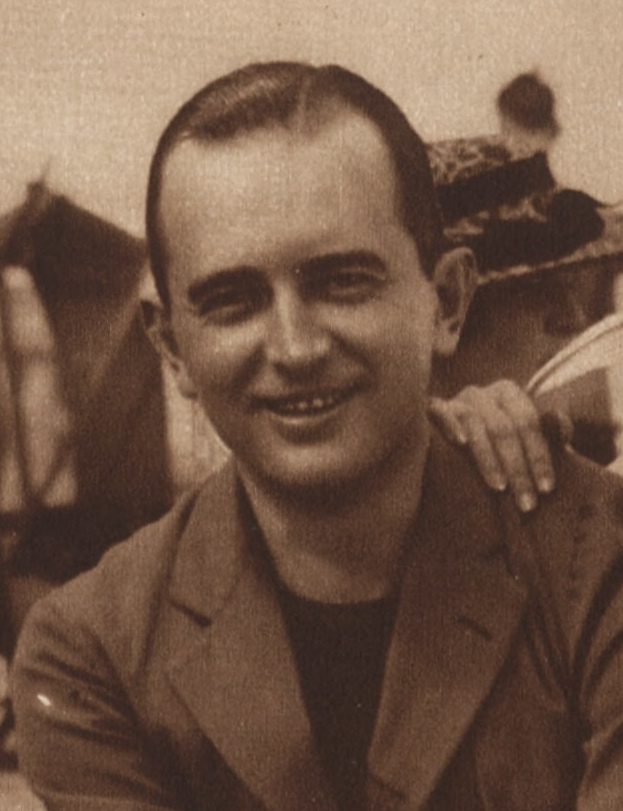
- Duke in 1915
- Born: December 8, 1884; Durham, North Carolina
- Died: September 3, 1923 (aged 38); Greenwich, Connecticut
- Resting place: Maplewood Cemetery
- Education: Duke University
- Spouse: Cordelia Drexel Biddle (m. 1915; div. 1921)
- Children: Angier Biddle Duke; Anthony Drexel Duke
- Parent(s): Benjamin Newton Duke; Sarah Pearson Angier
- Relatives: Mary Lillian Duke (sister); Doris Duke (cousin)

Angier Buchanan Duke (December 8, 1884 – September 3, 1923) was a trustee of Duke University from 1914–1923, as well as vice president and president of its Alumni Association.

== Early life ==
Duke was born on December 8, 1884, in Durham, North Carolina. He was the only son of Sarah Pearson (née Angier) Duke (1856–1936) and Benjamin Newton Duke, and an heir to the American Tobacco Company fortune. He was the brother of Mary Lillian Duke (who married his wife's brother, Anthony Joseph Drexel Biddle Jr.), and first cousin to the flamboyant heiress Doris Duke.

Duke attended Durham's Trinity College, the institutional predecessor of Duke University.

== Career ==
After his graduation from Trinity, he went into the family business with his father. He was a member of the Racquet and Tennis Club and the Calumet Club, as well as the Ardsley and Sleepy Hollow Country Clubs.

== Personal life ==
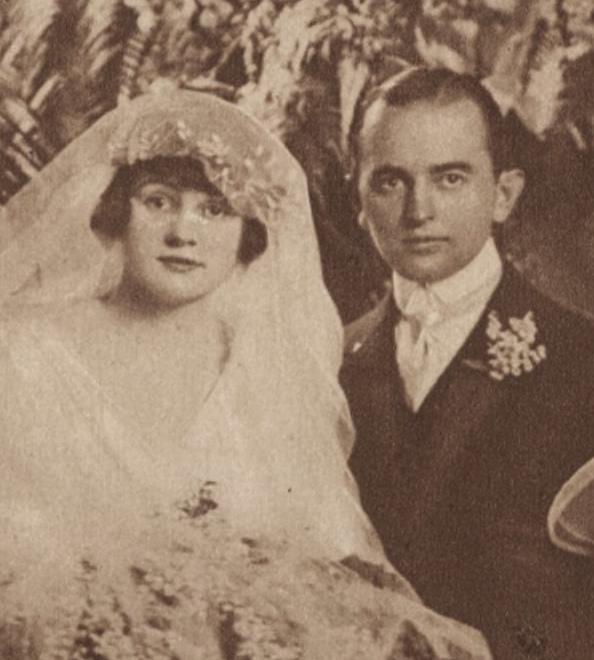
Duke and Cordelia Biddle at their wedding

In 1915, he was married to seventeen year-old Cordelia Drexel Biddle of the Biddle family who were prominent in business, political and cultural affairs in Philadelphia. By this marriage, which took place at Holy Trinity Church in Philadelphia, "one of the oldest and richest Philadelphia families was united with one of the richest families of the South." Cordelia was a daughter of bank heir Anthony Joseph Drexel Biddle, Sr. Together, Angier and Cordelia were the parents of two children:

- Angier Biddle Duke (1915–1995), the U.S. Ambassador to El Salvador, Spain, Denmark, and Morocco. He married four times.
- Anthony Drexel Duke (1918–2014), who became a prominent philanthropist. He married four times.

After separating in December 1918, they divorced in 1921. After their divorce, Cordelia remarried to Thomas Markoe Robertson in 1924.

Following the accidental discharge of his gun in 1905 during a hunting trip, his left arm was amputated below the elbow. In 1923, he drowned at Indian Harbor Yacht Club on Long Island Sound (near his summer residence in Port Jefferson), when a boat overturned and he was unable to get back into the boat because of his missing hand. After a funeral at the Duke family home in Durham, he was interred in the Duke Mausoleum in Maplewood Cemetery in Durham.

== Legacy ==
The A.B. Duke scholarship program, the oldest merit scholarship program at Duke University, was established in 1925 by his parents to honor Angier Buchanan Duke.

== In popular culture ==
John Davidson portrayed Duke in the 1967 musical film The Happiest Millionaire.
