= Marine Detachment =

US Marine Corps unit stationed on large naval ships

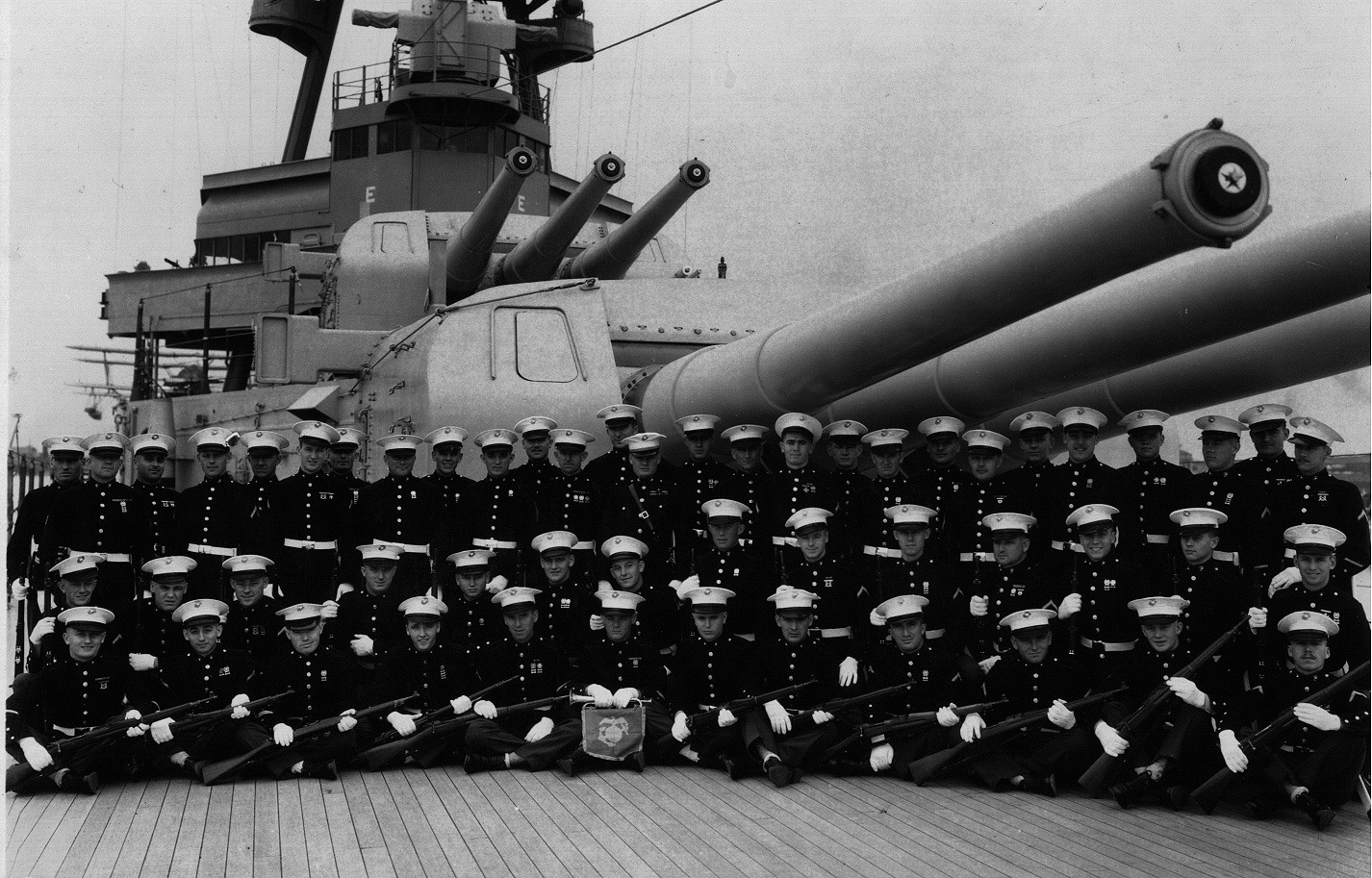
Marine Detachment aboard USS Augusta in the 1930s

A Marine Detachment, or MarDet, was a unit of United States Marines permanently embarked on large warships including cruisers, battleships, and aircraft carriers, typically consisting of anywhere between 35 and 85 men. They were a regular component of a ship's company from the formation of the United States Marine Corps until 1998. Missions of shipboard Marine Detachments evolved, and included protecting the ship's captain, security and defense of the ship, firing anti-aircraft artillary, operating the brig, limited action ashore, securing nuclear weapons and ceremonial details. The Marines' successful command structure for dispersed detachments aboard warships encouraged detachments for other purposes.

== History of shipboard Marine detachments ==
1959 documentary about Marine Detachments

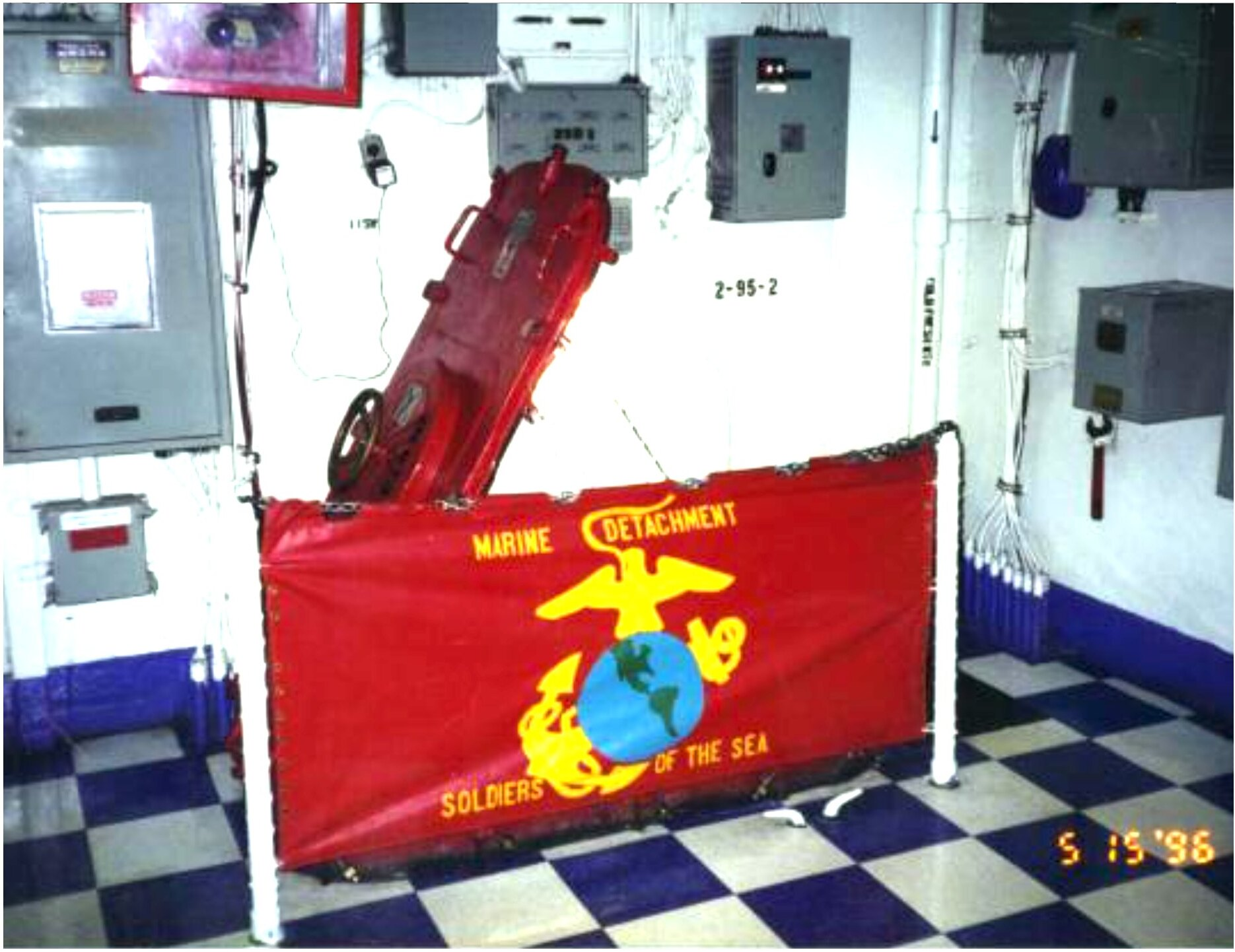
MarDet banner aboard USS Nimitz in 1996, with the slogan "Soldiers of the Sea"

The Continental Congress established a Marine Corps of two battalions on 10 November 1775. Marines were detached from these battalions to serve aboard individual warships. Although these battalions were temporarily disbanded following the American Revolutionary War, the United States Marine Corps was created on 11 July 1798 to serve under the United States Secretary of the Navy. The 1834 Act for the Better Organization of the United States Marine Corps clarified the Marines chain of command through the United States Navy. Marines served aboard sailing ships as a small amphibious force able to capture and hold minor port facilities as required for protection of American interests, such as in the Battle of Hatteras Inlet Batteries and the First Battle of Fort Fisher during the American Civil War. Marine sharpshooters were often stationed in the rigging during ship-to-ship combat to fire at officers and helmsmen aboard enemy warships. Marines often operated naval artillery during general quarters when the distances of gunnery engagements exceeded the range of small arms.

As modern Navy tactics evolved away from traditional ship-to-ship combat to fighting over the horizon threats with guided missiles and computer controlled weapons systems, the shipboard responsibilities requiring an independent Marine Detachment aboard ships became more of an anachronism better suited to be absorbed by Navy Master-at-arms.

The individual seaborne landing parties became Fleet Anti-terrorism Security Teams (FAST), able to rapidly deploy where and as needed instead of scattered across the fleet. By 1998, only 11 officers and 275 enlisted Marines remained assigned to individual Marine Detachments when ALMARS 24/98 announced all Marine ships' detachments were to be disestablished. USMC 1stLt Grant Goodrich would be the last commander of a MarDet when he stood down his unit aboard USS George Washington (CVN-73) on 1 May 1998, at a ceremony following their return home from their deployment.

== Officers ==
Each shipboard MarDet included a Marine Corps commanding officer who reported to the Commandant of the Marine Corps through the ship's captain. When more than one Marine officer was assigned to a ship, United States Navy Regulations required one Marine officer to be aboard ship at all times unless excused by the ship's captain. Marine officers below the rank of major sometimes served as officer of the deck.

== Other Marine detachments ==
The State Department relied upon the Navy's ability to transport shipboard Marine detachments overseas for rescue, escort, and defense of United States diplomatic missions before air travel was available. Since 1948, detachments of Marine Security Guards have been stationed at United States embassies and consulates around the world. There have been a few mounted detachments. An executive flight detachment was created in 1958 to transport the President of the United States and other key government officials.
