= Anthony Biddle =

Anthony Biddle may refer to:

- Anthony Joseph Drexel Biddle Sr. (1876–1948), American philanthropist; person on whom the film The Happiest Millionaire was based
- Anthony Joseph Drexel Biddle Jr. (1897–1961), American diplomat
- Anthony Biddle (Paralympian) (born 1975), Australian Paralympic athlete and cyclist
