= Mamie Dowd Walker =

American judge

Judge for the Durham, North Carolina, city and county juvenile court
- In office December 3, 1934 – 1941; 1942 – December 5, 1949
- Appointed by: City and county of Durham

Personal details
- Born: Mary Rebecca Dowd; May 11, 1880 Durham, North Carolina, U.S.
- Died: July 12, 1960 (aged 80) Durham, North Carolina, U.S.
- Resting place: Maplewood Cemetery
- Spouse: Fielding Walker Jr. (m. 1904; died 1934)
- Children: 2

Mary Rebecca "Mamie" Dowd Walker (May 11, 1880 – July 12, 1960) was a jurist and civil leader in Durham, North Carolina, United States. She became North Carolina's first female judge when in 1934 she was appointed to preside over Durham's juvenile court. Working with other public servants, Walker introduced countywide reforms to combat delinquency pushing alternatives to incarceration, including prevention and rehabilitation. Her methods were adopted by other United States courts.

== Education and personal life ==
Walker was born on May 11, 1880, north of Durham. Her parents, who practiced Methodism, were tobacconist John Watson and Susan Lipscombe Dowd. They had one other child, William Lipscombe Dowd. Mamie grew up in Durham and graduated from Durham High School as well as from the Greensboro Female Seminary in Greensboro.

Walker got married on October 26, 1904, to Fielding Lewis Walker Jr. (1877–1934), who worked as a manager for the Liggett and Myers Tobacco Company in Durham. They had two children, Fielding Lewis III and Mary Lipscombe.

== Career ==
Walker was a longtime member of Durham's City Recreation Commission (and its first chair) and served the Durham Board of Education. In both roles she worked with juveniles and developed a record of public service. Though she never received formal law training, she was appointed to be the first judge for Durham's city and county juvenile court. The city and county government created that court to be body independent from the region's superior court, a change advocated by the American Association of University Women. Walker was sworn in on December 3, 1934; this gave Walker the distinction of being the first woman judge in North Carolina.

In her fourteen years of juvenile-court service, Walker—informed by her contact with the National Probation and Parole Association, which developed juvenile and domestic court benchmarks—made reforms to prevent and deal with juvenile delinquency using alternatives to incarceration. She also set up two racially segregated coordinating councils to supplement the juvenile court in preventing criminal offense and promoting rehabilitation.

Walker enlisted extrajudicial help to tackle delinquency, working with churches, schools, police, health and recreation departments and nearby Duke University. She contributed to the formation of a guard patrol for schoolchildren and in 1945 formed the Durham County Youth Home, providing housing for delinquents while their cases went through the legal system. She touted supervised playtime for children as a solution to anti-social behavior, launching some of Durham's first playgrounds, and she helped start several youth groups, including the John Avery Boys and Girls Club. For over 25 years she was an active member of the National Recreation Association and was a cosignatory on many of its publications. During her tenure she gave over 450 speeches, usually about the Durham juvenile court, its projects and how it could be supported.

== Death and legacy ==
Walker served almost continuously as judge until she retired on December 5, 1949, although she had not been reappointed for the 1941–42 term, when the seat was given to G. Frank Warner, and Durham citizens white and black rallied behind Walker until she was restored the next year. In her retirement Walker stayed out of the public eye but remained close to her friends. She died on July 12, 1960, one month after her 80th birthday, and was interred in Maplewood Cemetery, near St. Philip's Episcopal Church.

Some of Walker's reforms were adopted by courts around the United States. Her grandson Milo Pyne said in 2014 that she had "understood the disparities [among] different segments of the community and confronted the inequalities as a result of segregation." The scope of the Durham juvenile court was in 1968 absorbed into the juvenile division of North Carolina's 14th district court.
