= Flag of Durham, North Carolina =

City of Durham
- Proportion: 3:5
- Adopted: 1989
- Design: Two halves arranged horizontally; the first with two even vertical bars of red and gold; the second with a blue field defaced by seven white stars
- Designed by: Al Nichols

The flag of Durham, North Carolina was adopted in 1989 as part of a city-wide contest, won by artist Al Nichols. The flag is evenly divided into two halves; the half on the side of the hoist features two vertical, evenly divided bars of red and gold, and the second half features a blue field with seven stars. The logo of the City of Durham is based on the flag.

== Design and symbolism ==
The intention of the flag design contest was to create a flag representing the "New Spirit" of Durham, intending to tie the city's history with its future. Blue was chosen to represent courage, red to represent action and progress, gold to represent high quality and effort in growth, and white to represent high ideals.

The seven stars on the flag represent a group known as the Pleiades, found in the Taurus constellation. The stars are said to reflect Durham's spirit and history in the following ways:

- The arts
- Commerce and industry
- Education
- Medicine
- Human relations
- Sports and recreation
- Preservation of heritage

The seven stars in the Taurus constellation additionally represent the city's namesake, Bartlett S. Durham, through his zodiac sign, Taurus, and birthday, April 26. Durham was a physician and entrepreneur, and his professions can be found in the symbolism of the stars.

=== Reception ===
In a 2022 flag survey conducted by the North American Vexillological Association, the flag of Durham ranked 36th out of 312 city flags in the United States, at a rating of 6.93 out of 10. It was not included in their 2004 city flag survey.

=== City logo ===
The city of Durham released its current logo in 2017, and was designed and revised at a cost of US$20,000. Two versions exist, both similar to the flag. One version is stretched vertically, and one is horizontally oriented; both feature narrower red and gold bars and a larger blue field. The logo is said to symbolize the messaging in the original flag in addition to cultural identity, diversity, and inclusivity.
