= Miss Mary Lillian Duke =

1911 painting by Joaquín Sorolla

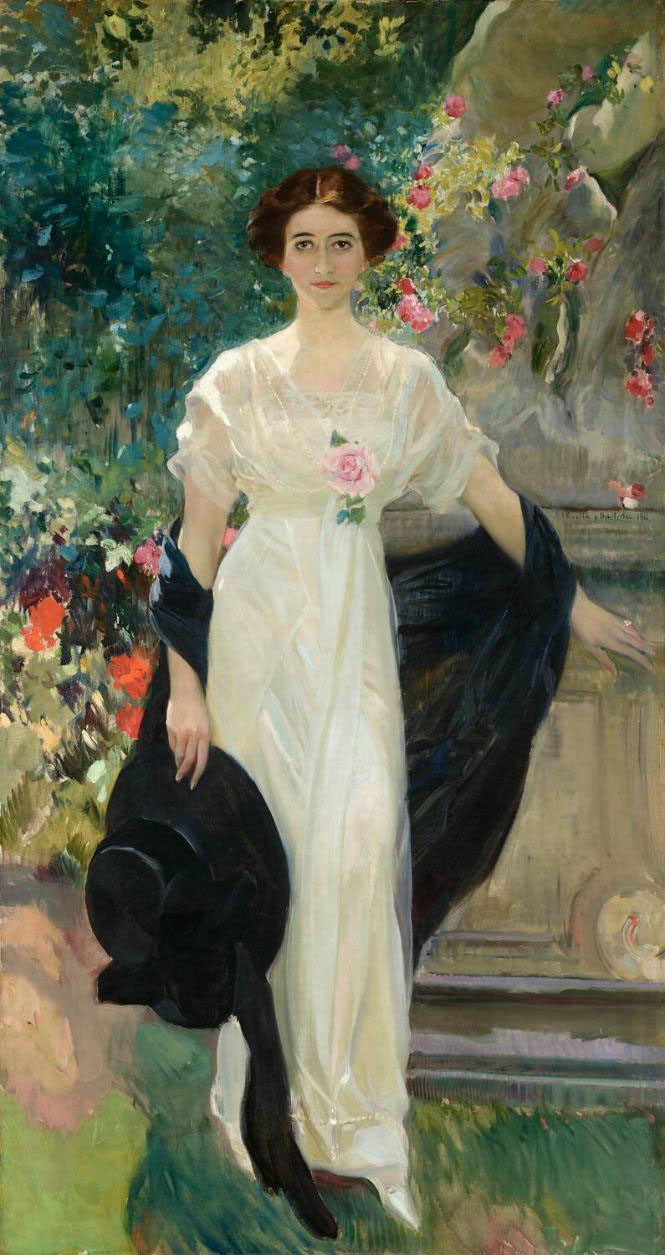
- Artist: Joaquín Sorolla
- Year: 1911
- Medium: oil on canvas
- Dimensions: 211.5 cm × 113.7 cm (83.3 in × 44.8 in)
- Location: Nasher Museum of Art, Durham

Miss Mary Lillian Duke is a 1911 oil-on-canvas painting by the Spanish painter Joaquín Sorolla.

== Description ==
The painting is part of the collection of the Nasher Museum of Art in Durham. It is a portrait of the 24-year old woman who commissioned it, Mary Lillian Duke (1887–1960). It was painted in a park. It depicts Mary in a white dress, standing with one hand resting on the pedestal of a statue while the other holds a black hat. She wears a scarf of the same color that falls on her arms, resembling the color of her hair and creating a strong contrast with the light colors that she was wearing. To make the portrait more graceful, Mary had a rose pinned on her dress near her chest and the pink colour of the flower stands out above everything.

== Provenance ==
The painting was one of the four paintings sent by Benjamin Duke to Sorolla, for his residence in New York, which was then under construction. Nicholas Duke Biddle, a relative of Mary Lillian Duke Biddle, donated the painting to Duke University. Since that time, it has belonged to the collection of the Nasher Museum of Art in Durham.
