= Anthony Joseph Drexel Biddle Jr. =

United States diplomat (1897–1961)

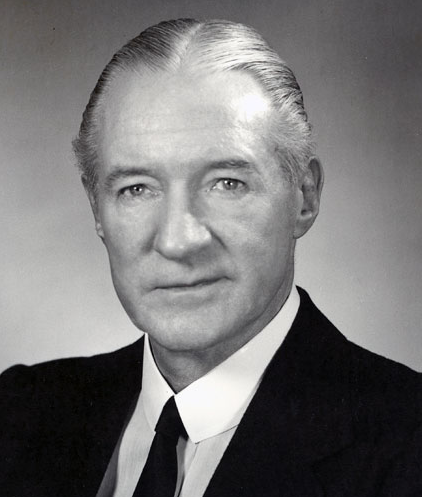

49th United States Ambassador to Spain
- In office May 25, 1961 – October 12, 1961
- President: John F. Kennedy
- Preceded by: John Davis Lodge
- Succeeded by: Robert F. Woodward

1st United States Ambassador to Czechoslovakia
- In office July 12, 1943 – December 1, 1943
- President: Franklin D. Roosevelt
- Preceded by: Himself (as Minister)
- Succeeded by: Laurence A. Steinhardt

1st United States Ambassador to Yugoslavia
- In office November 3, 1942 – September 28, 1943
- President: Franklin D. Roosevelt
- Preceded by: Himself (as Minister)
- Succeeded by: Lincoln MacVeagh

1st United States Ambassador to Greece
- In office October 30, 1942 – March 16, 1943
- President: Franklin D. Roosevelt
- Preceded by: Himself (as Minister)
- Succeeded by: Alexander Comstock Kirk

1st United States Ambassador to Norway
- In office May 13, 1942 – December 1, 1943
- President: Franklin D. Roosevelt
- Preceded by: Himself (as Minister)
- Succeeded by: Lithgow Osborne

1st United States Ambassador to the Netherlands
- In office May 8, 1942 – December 1, 1943
- President: Franklin D. Roosevelt
- Preceded by: Himself (as Minister)
- Succeeded by: Stanley Hornbeck

22nd United States Minister to Greece
- In office November 28, 1941 – October 30, 1942
- President: Franklin D. Roosevelt
- Preceded by: Lincoln MacVeagh
- Succeeded by: Himself (as Ambassador)

7th United States Minister to Czechoslovakia
- In office October 28, 1941 – July 12, 1943
- President: Franklin D. Roosevelt
- Preceded by: Wilbur J. Carr
- Succeeded by: Himself (as Ambassador)

5th United States Minister to Yugoslavia
- In office October 3, 1941 – October 3, 1942
- President: Franklin D. Roosevelt
- Preceded by: Arthur Bliss Lane
- Succeeded by: Himself (as Ambassador)

30th United States Minister to the Netherlands
- In office March 27, 1941 – May 8, 1942
- President: Franklin D. Roosevelt
- Preceded by: George A. Gordon
- Succeeded by: Himself (as Ambassador)

9th United States Ambassador to Belgium
- In office March 24, 1941 – December 1, 1943
- President: Franklin D. Roosevelt
- Preceded by: John Cudahy
- Succeeded by: Charles W. Sawyer

7th and 9th United States Minister to Norway
- In office March 20, 1941 – May 13, 1942
- President: Franklin D. Roosevelt
- Preceded by: Florence Harriman
- Succeeded by: Himself (as Ambassador)
- In office September 7, 1935 – May 21, 1937
- Preceded by: Hoffman Philip
- Succeeded by: Florence Harriman

5th United States Ambassador to Poland
- In office June 2, 1937 – December 1, 1943
- President: Franklin D. Roosevelt
- Preceded by: John Cudahy
- Succeeded by: Arthur Bliss Lane

Personal details
- Born: December 17, 1897 Philadelphia, Pennsylvania, U.S.
- Died: November 13, 1961 (aged 63) Washington, D.C., U.S.
- Resting place: Arlington National Cemetery
- Spouses: Mary Lillian Duke (m. 1915; div. 1931) Margaret Thompson Schulze (m. 1931; div. 1945) Margaret Atkinson Loughborough (m. 1946–1961)
- Children: 4, including Mary
- Parent: Anthony Joseph Drexel Biddle Sr. (father)

Military service
- Allegiance: United States
- Branch/service: United States Army
- Years of service: 1917–1919; 1944–1955
- Rank: Major General
- Battles/wars: World War I World War II

Anthony Joseph Drexel Biddle Jr. (December 17, 1897 – November 13, 1961) was an American diplomat who served as ambassador to several countries between the 1930s and 1961. He served in the United States Army during World Wars I and II, continuing after the war and rising from an enlisted Private to a commissioned major general.

== Early life ==
Biddle was the son of millionaire Anthony Joseph Drexel Biddle Sr. (1874–1948), and Cordelia Rundell Bradley (1873–1947). A member of the Biddle family, he was born in Philadelphia, on December 17, 1897. His father, grandson of banker Anthony Joseph Drexel and great-grandson of banker Nicholas Biddle, was an eccentric boxing fan. When he was ten years old, the younger Biddle was in an exhibition match with Bob Fitzsimmons, who knocked him into a wall with a punch traveling about two inches.

He graduated from St. Paul's School in Concord, New Hampshire, but never attended college.

== Career ==
In World War I, he first enlisted as a private, and was promoted to rank of captain. In the 1920s he engaged in several business ventures, which were known as social successes but financial failures. For example, he managed Belgian boxer René deVos, and invested in the St. Regis Hotel. A party he held for the boxer at the hotel was marked by the loss of many bottles of fine champagne (at great expense due to prohibition in the United States). "Guests" even tried to wheel out the piano before it was retrieved.

Biddle also made a deal to rent part of Central Park in New York City and open an expensive nightclub called Central Park Casino. After the Wall Street crash of 1929 many of his investments failed. The Casino was raided and shut down.

In 1931 he and other directors of the bankrupt Sonora Products Corporation of America (formerly Acoustic Products Company, in the phonograph and radio business) were sued by the Irving Trust Company. The directors were accused of diverting profits from stock sales into their own accounts. A district court dismissed the claims against the defendants, but the dismissal of Biddle and several others was reversed on appeal.

=== Diplomatic career ===
After Biddle was appointed Envoy Extraordinary and Minister Plenipotentiary to Norway on July 22, 1935, he settled the Irving case out of court to avoid a bond required before leaving the country to assume the post. He presented his credentials on September 7, 1935. It was widely suspected he was a political appointee resulting from his support of the Democratic Party and George Howard Earle III, its 1934 successful candidate for Governor of Pennsylvania. However, his social skills made him and his wife ideally suited to being a diplomat.

On May 4, 1937, he was promoted to Ambassador to Poland and presented his credentials in Warsaw, Poland, on June 2, 1937. In September 1939 Germany invaded Poland, which was a major cause of World War II. After Biddle's house was hit with bomb fragments, his family and embassy staff fled to various temporary quarters. After the escape, he joined the Polish government in exile in France until June 1940, when he and his wife Margaret received transit visas from the Portuguese consul Aristides de Sousa Mendes, in Bordeaux, and crossed into Portugal. They stayed in Estoril, at the Hotel Palácio, between 19 July and 31 July 1940. On 1 August 1940, they boarded the S.S. Excalibur headed for New York City, arriving on 10 August.

On February 11, 1941, he also commissioned to the governments-in-exile of Belgium, Czechoslovakia, Greece, Luxembourg, the Netherlands, Norway, and Yugoslavia. Biddle arrived in London on March 14, 1941, and continued as ambassador through 1943. During the period, he owned Saint Hill Manor in West Sussex, a country estate which was later sold to Church of Scientology founder L. Ron Hubbard.

=== Later career ===
In January 1944, Biddle resigned from the State Department and joined the Army as lieutenant colonel to serve on the staff of Dwight Eisenhower. His contacts with "underground" movements and free military units in occupied nations provided intelligence for the planning of Operation Overlord, the Allied invasion of France. He continued on Eisenhower's staff supervising European reconstruction after the war ended. In March 1951 he was promoted to brigadier general. At his promotion ceremony, Eisenhower pinned on one of Biddle's stars.

In April 1955, he resigned from the Army to become Adjutant General of the Pennsylvania National Guard. Nevertheless, as a member of the Army Reserve, he was promoted to major general in August.

In 1961, Biddle became the United States Ambassador to Spain, though he did not speak Spanish fluently; in which he served until shortly before his death.

== Personal life ==
On June 16, 1915, Biddle married Mary Lillian Duke (1887–1960), a tobacco heiress who was the daughter of Benjamin Newton Duke. They divorced in 1931 after having two children:

- Mary Duke Biddle (1920–2012), who married Josiah Charles Trent. After his death, she married James Semans.
- Nicholas Duke Biddle (1921–2004), who was initially named Anthony Joseph Drexel Biddle III, only to have his mother change his name following the divorce.

His second wife, whom he married in 1931, was Margaret Thompson Schulze (d. 1956), the only child of mining magnate William Boyce Thompson and recent divorcee of Theodore M. Schulze, a New York banker. Through this marriage he had two stepchildren, (Margaret) Boyce Schulze and Theodore Schulze Jr, as well as a son before their divorce in 1945:

- Anthony Joseph Drexel Biddle III, who died at birth.

He married as his third wife, in 1946, Margaret Atkinson Loughborough (1915–2013), the former wife of William Ellery Loughborough and had two more children:

- Margaret Biddle
- Anthony Joseph Drexel Biddle III (b. 1948)

He died November 13, 1961, in Washington, D.C., at the Walter Reed Army Hospital. He was interred at Arlington National Cemetery. His cenotaph is at The Woodlands Cemetery in Philadelphia. After Biddle's death, she married, as her third husband, Colonel Edwinston Robbins.

=== Personal style ===
A wealthy socialite, Biddle was known for being elegantly dressed. On October 4, 1943, he appeared on the cover of Life magazine. The one published picture of Biddle without his impeccable suit was when he had to pack in a hurry to escape German bombers in Poland via Romania. He was recognized in 1960 by George Frazier as one of the best dressed men in the US, on a short list with such stars as Fred Astaire. He was noted for his small number of fine custom-made suits and his starched, horizontally-striped Charvet shirts.

=== Legacy ===
His sister Cordelia Drexel Biddle wrote a book with Kyle Crichton about the family, focusing on her marriage with Angier Buchanan Duke, who was the brother of Anthony's first wife. It was made into a play and the 1967 musical film The Happiest Millionaire. He was portrayed by Paul Petersen in the film.

His nephew Angier Biddle Duke (1915–1995) also became a diplomat.

== Diplomatic posts ==
- U.S. Minister to:
  - Norway, 1935–37, 20 March 1941 – 1 December 1943
  - Netherlands, 27 March 1941 – 1 December 1943
  - Yugoslavia, 30 July 1941 – 28 September 1943
  - Czechoslovakia, 28 October 1941 – 1 December 1943
  - Greece, 28 November 1941 – 16 March 1943
- U.S. Ambassador to:
  - Poland, 1937–1 December 1943
  - Belgium, 24 March 1941 – 1 December 1943
  - Netherlands, 1942–43
  - Norway, 20 March 1941 – 1 December 1943
  - Yugoslavia, 1942
  - Greece, 1942–43
  - Czechoslovakia, 1943
  - Spain, 1961

His multiple appointments from 1941 to 1943 were to governments-in-exile in London.

== Orders, decorations and medals ==
- Distinguished Service Medal
- Legion of Merit
- World War I Victory Medal
- European-African-Middle Eastern Campaign Medal
- World War II Victory Medal
- Army of Occupation Medal
- National Defense Service Medal
- Armed Forces Reserve Medal

Note – Ambassador Drexel also received numerous foreign orders and decorations.

== Lawsuit ==
- Irving Trust Co. v. Deutsch, 73 F.2d 121 (2d. Cir. 1934), cert. denied, Biddle v. Irving Trust Company, 294 U.S. 708, 55 S.Ct. 405, 79 L.Ed. 1243 (1935)

Diplomatic posts
| Preceded by Hoffman Philip | U.S. Ambassador to Norway; 1935–1937 | Succeeded by Florence Jaffray Harriman |
| Preceded by John Cudahy | U.S. Ambassador to Poland; 1937–1943 | Succeeded by Arthur Bliss Lane |
| Preceded by Florence Jaffray Harriman | U.S. Ambassador; 1941–1943; To the governments-in-exile in England. Commissioned also to Belgium, Czechoslovakia, Greece, Luxembourg, the Netherlands, Norway, Poland, and Yugoslavia; resident at London. | Succeeded by Lithgow Osborne |
| Preceded by John Lodge | U.S. Ambassador to Spain; 1961 | Succeeded by Robert F. Woodward |
