= Durham School of the Arts =

American government secondary school in North Carolina

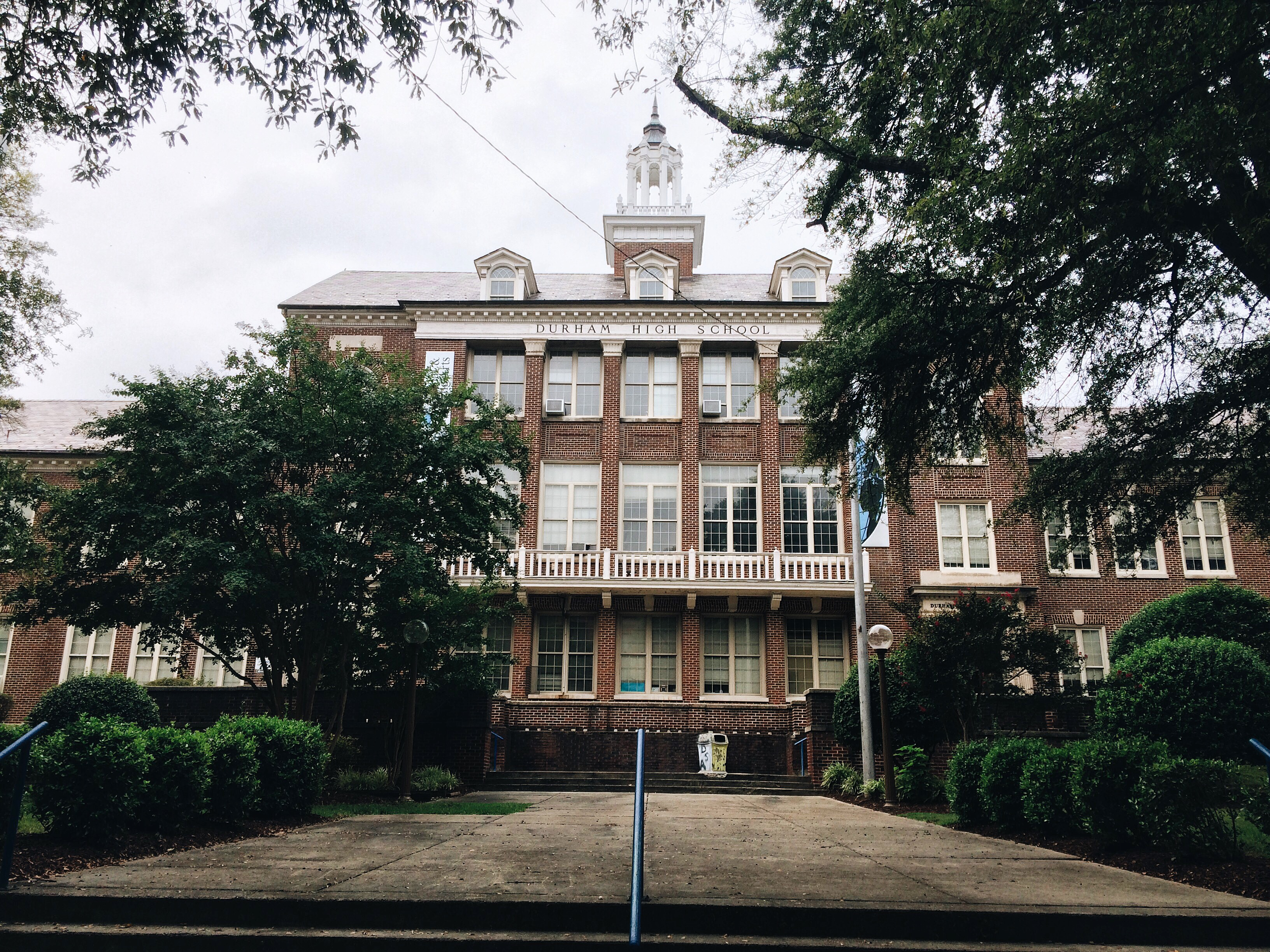

Location
- 400 North Duke Street; Durham, North Carolina 27701; United States; 36°0′12″N 78°54′23″W

Information
- Type: Government secondary school
- Established: 1903 (123 years ago)
- School district: Durham Public Schools
- Category: Magnet school
- CEEB code: 341050
- Principal: Don Jones
- Teaching staff: 110.98 (FTE)
- Grades: 6–12
- Enrollment: 1,767 (2023-2024)
- Student to teacher ratio: 15.92
- Campus type: Urban
- Colors: Blue, black, and white
- Athletics: Fall: Cross-Country, Men's Soccer, Women's Tennis, Volleyball; Winter: Basketball, Swimming, Indoor Track, Wrestling; Spring: Baseball, Women's Soccer, Softball, Men's Tennis, Track & Field, Ultimate Frisbee
- Mascot: Bulldog
- EOG average: Reading 88.4, Math 65.0
- Yearbook: "Flashback"
- Website: www.dpsnc.net/o/durhamschoolofthearts
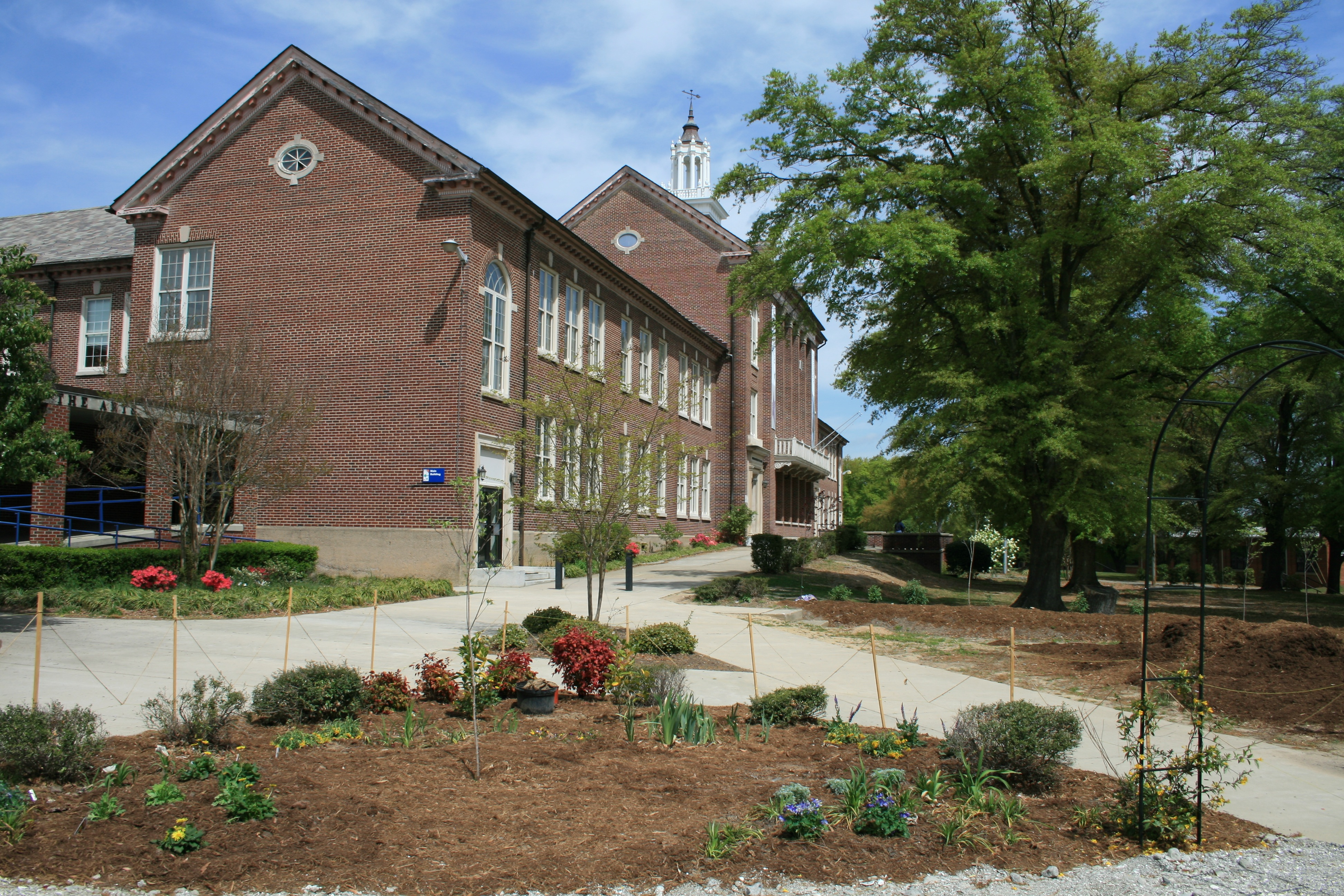

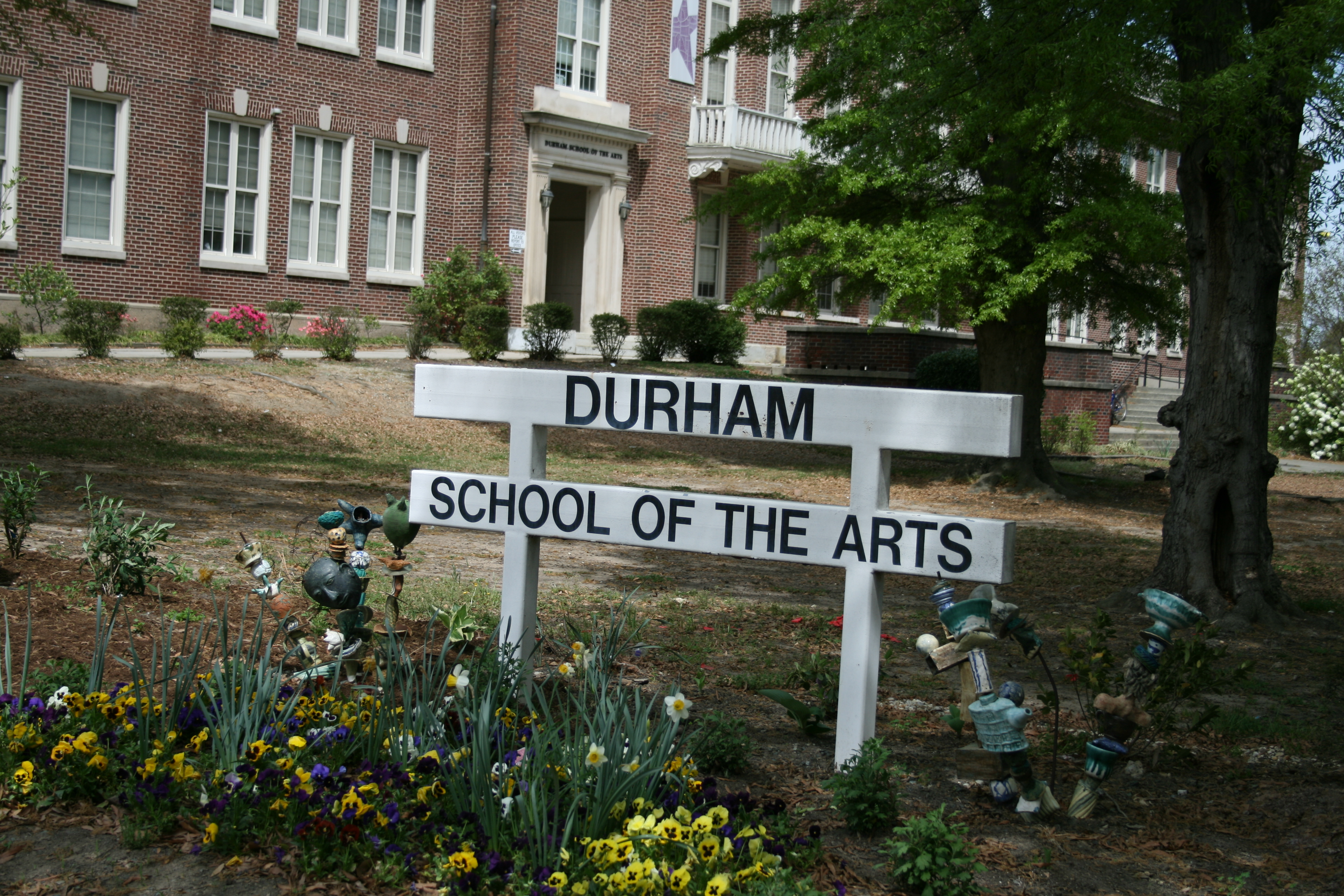
- The entrance of the Durham School of the Arts Main Building

Durham School of the Arts (DSA) is a secondary magnet school located in downtown Durham, North Carolina, United States, housing 1,890 students. Its focus is on the visual and performing arts.

Arts offerings include 3D and 2D art, chorus, dance, guitar, strings, band, piano, acting, technical theatre, writing, digital media, game art design, and photography. Teachers of all subjects are encouraged to incorporate the arts into their teaching to maximize student engagement. Composite test scores from 2009 are in the top 25% in the district among high schools, and exceed the state average. Approximately 200 students are enrolled in each grade.

Students enroll through a lottery system and can be entered into this lottery as early as the sixth grade. The only way to get into DSA is through the school lottery. Students living near the school do not automatically gain enrollment, although many have made it into the school through the official lottery. Most students are admitted in 6th grade, though there are no rules prohibiting entrance after that age, as there is some turnover in higher grades. The primary year for turnover is 9th grade, when many students transfer to other area high schools.

== History ==
=== 1903 to 1995: Durham High School ===
Durham School of the Arts is housed in the former Durham High School building near the Trinity Historic District. During racial segregation Durham High School primarily served the white community of Durham, whereas Hillside High School served the black community.

Opening in 1906, Central High School, which was located on Morris Street, educated Durham's white high school students until 1922. The building was then converted to Durham's City Hall and is now the home of the Durham Arts Council (also known as Royall Center for the Arts).

In 1922, A new building (now known as the "Main Building") was built on property that once belonged to Brodie L. Duke. This became Durham High School.

In 1926, Central Junior High School opened in a building on property adjacent to Durham High School. The school was renamed Julian S. Carr Junior High School in 1945. In the 1950s, Weaver Auditorium was built adjacent to the Main Building, replacing the smaller Auditorium inside the Main Building, which was split into two floors. In 1975, the Julian S. Carr Junior High School merged into Durham High School, and was simply known as the Julian S. Carr Building.

By the 1970s the population of Durham High School had changed from largely white to mostly black. Durham High School closed as a traditional high school in 1993, the principal at the time was Mr. Anthony D. Jackson. Mr. Jackson led the initial planning of the programming for what would eventually become the new magnet program at Durham High School (Durham Magnet Center, later Durham School of the Arts).

=== 1995 to 2007: Durham School of the Arts ===
Durham School of the Arts first opened in 1995 as Durham Magnet Center, a middle school. The school added a grade each year for until the school reached grades six through twelve. DSA graduated its first high school class in 2000.

==== The Laramie Project ====
In May 2005, Durham School of the Arts performed The Laramie Project, a controversial play depicting the murder of Mathew Shepard. Ten members of Fred Phelps' Westboro Baptist Church came from Topeka, Kansas to protest the show, the actors, and director, Douglas J. Graves. Although Fred Phelps wasn't present, relatives were including his son, Jonathan Phelps, and his twelve-year-old granddaughter, Grace Phelps-Roger. Phelps did describe the school as "the fag-infested Durham School of the Arts" and said that the Laramie Project was a "propaganda play". Signs held by the group included ones that said "Thank God for Sept. 11.", "The Pope is in Hell", and "God Hates Fags". The Christian group also protested in front of various area churches. However the Westboro Baptist Church did not gain much support and was met by over 200 counter-protesters.

==== Past principals ====
Since opening in 1995, Durham School of the Arts has had six principals:

- Ed Forsyth (1995–2003)
- Chris Bennett (2003–2005)
- Lee Vrana [2005]
- Ronald Roukema (2005–2007)
- David Hawks (2007–2021)
- Jackie Tobias (2021-2025)

== Campus ==
The campus consists of six semi-connected buildings: the Middle School Building (formerly the Julian S. Carr Building), the Black Box Theater (formerly the Durham High School auto shop), the Media Center, the Weaver Auditorium, the Main Building, the Gymnasium, and the Science Academy Building (often called the Science or Academy Building), as well as the recently completed New Building, housing 8th and 9th grade classes, along with the high school English department. The new building uses the letter "T" in front of its classroom numbers for "Transition" Building (as in the transition from middle to high school).

=== Middle School Building ===
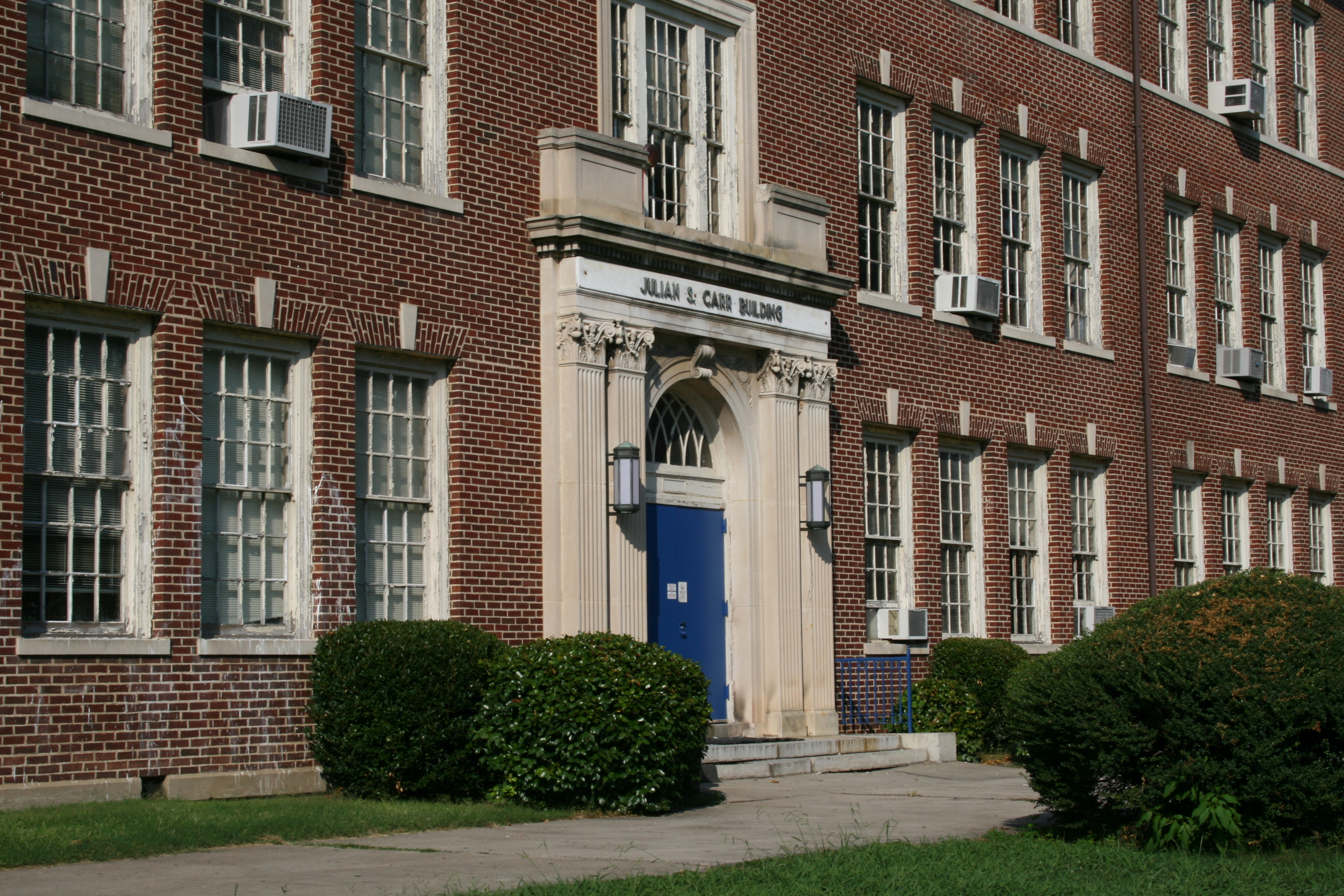
Middle School Building before renovations

The Julian S. Carr Building or Carr Building, named in honor of Julian Shakespeare Carr, originally housed students at the whites-only Carr Middle School. It merged with Durham High School in 1975; Durham High School closed in 1993. Classes in the Carr Building were usually Language Arts or Social Studies as opposed to those in the Science Academy building, which houses more mathematics and science. The building has three stories and a basement. The building has its own gym, dance room, and cafeteria. The building was built in the 1920s. A $194.2 million bond was proposed to put $15,141,636 towards repairs on the building, which showed signs of aging. In the 2007–2008 school year, the third floor and basement were sealed off, leaving just the first and second floors occupied; in the 2010–2011 school year, the building was closed completely for repairs. In the fall of 2011, the building was reopened after renovations were completed. The basement, which now holds electives for all students (including high schoolers at the school), and the third floor, which is now a cafeteria for the 6th and 7th graders, were reopened as well. It currently holds 6th and 7th grade classes.

On August 24, 2017, in addition to prohibiting the Confederate flag, the Board of the Durham Public Schools voted unanimously to remove Carr's name from the building. Students on campus began to call it the Middle School Building.

=== Main building ===
Durham School of the Arts's main building is the biggest building on the campus. It holds a wide variety of classes in it every day. The building has three stories and a basement. The first floor contains classrooms mostly used by the Piano, Chorus, and Visual Art departments, the main cafeteria, and the central and guidance offices. The second floor consists of the History and Foreign Language departments, as well as some middle-level classes. The third floor consists of a computer laboratory, which teachers can reserve for some class periods for their class to use, and the Guitar department. The basement houses the Exceptional Children department for students with autism and other cognitive disabilities.

In summer of 2020, the building went under repairs, which included making the roof metal and repairing the bell tower that sits on top of the building. Some of the structural issues with the building were also repaired during the renovation.

=== Black Box Theater ===
The Black Box Theater is home to the Theater department. Because of this, the building is where most of the theater classes are taught, with some of them being taught in the basement of the Middle School Building. There is a large open space used for theater shows. The Black Box Theater is two stories high and the home to almost all of Durham School of the Arts's theater productions. Originally the Black Box was the auto shop when the school was Durham High.

=== Science-Academy Building ===
The Science-Academy Building (or the Academy Building) is a two-story building located behind the main building. Classes taught there are mostly science and mathematics, as both the Science and Math departments are housed there. The Academy building is on the direct opposite end of the school from the Middle School Building and is located right next to the bus parking lot.

=== Weaver Auditorium ===
The Weaver Auditorium is a building used for speeches, presentations, and open houses. It also hosts school award ceremonies, school concerts/recitals, and some larger-scale theater presentations. Every year, on the last day before winter break for students, the school holds a winter showcase for all of the different departments in the school to show off their best students to the entire school. The departments that participate include all of the music departments, the Theater, Creative Writing, Dance, Visual and Digital Arts, and Exceptional Children departments. Weaver Auditorium has 1,600 seats. It was named for L. Stacy Weaver, Superintendent of Durham County Schools, who later founded Methodist College in Fayetteville, N.C., and served as its inaugural president.

=== Gymnasium ===
Although there is a gymnasium in the Middle School Building, Durham School of the Arts also has a semi-connected building as a gymnasium for high school physical education classes. This building has three stories, including a basement, the basketball courts, coach offices and changing areas, and audience seating. The basement holds a lot of classes for the Art department, including photography, 3D art (i.e. working with wood, metal, and other materials to create pieces), and 2D art (drawing/painting). It also holds the health classes that students have to take with their P.E. classes. The gymnasium holds most of the indoor athletic events like basketball games, wrestling matches, volleyball matches, and more. The gymnasium in the Middle School Building also holds some of these events in the case where there are two indoor events going on at the same time. Twice every school year (once at the end of the first quarter in October and once at the end of spirit week in February/March), the gymnasium also holds pep rallies, where some students from different departments would perform for the school. These pep rallies also honored different sports teams for representing the school. Cheerleading also performs at the pep rally, usually in a program with the Dance department.

=== New building ===
As part of the Durham Public School System 2003 Bond Project. $6,759,600 was donated for the construction of a new building. Construction for the building began in September 2007 and was completed in February 2008. The new building has two stories and a shared basement with Weaver Auditorium, and is 30,968 square feet (2,877.0 m^{2}). Some students and teachers on campus call it the T Building, as the room numbers for the building start with a T. The first floor holds 8th grade classes and 9th grade English classes. The second floor holds high-level English classes, Digital Arts classes, and Game Art and Design classes. The basement holds band classes and chorus classes for all grade levels. The basement also has many practice rooms for teachers and students to use.

=== Other ===
Besides Durham School of the Arts's main building there are several other points of interest at the school. In DSA's garden, called the Big Hearted Garden, there is a memorial in honor of three students, Aaron Morgan and Jonathan Henderson, who died in 2004 and 2006 of heart ailments, and Bennie Vanhook, who was shot and killed in December 2006. Morgan was fifteen years old, Henderson fourteen, and Vanhook seventeen. There are also two parking lots, one for cars in front of the Main Building and one for buses next to the Academy Building.

=== Future plans ===
The current campus does not have enough space for all the desired programs and cannot be expanded. A new campus estimated to cost $108.7 million is planned by 2025 on Duke Homestead Road.

== Classes ==
DSA is the only high school in the DPS system that does not operate on a block schedule. This means that while other high schools offer eight classes a year, four per semester or every other day throughout the year, DSA offers seven yearlong classes, along with semester-long classes for middle school and a limited selection for high school.

Unlike many other schools in the area, DSA follows the integrated math system, consisting of Integrated Algebra and Geometry (IAG) I through III, as well as IAG IV Social and Quantitative. IAG IV Quantitative (IAG IV Q) is pre-calculus.

DSA has the only Guitar and Game Art and Design departments in the district.

In February 2007, DSA was named and recognized as a national School of Excellence due to their curriculum, diversity, and high standards.

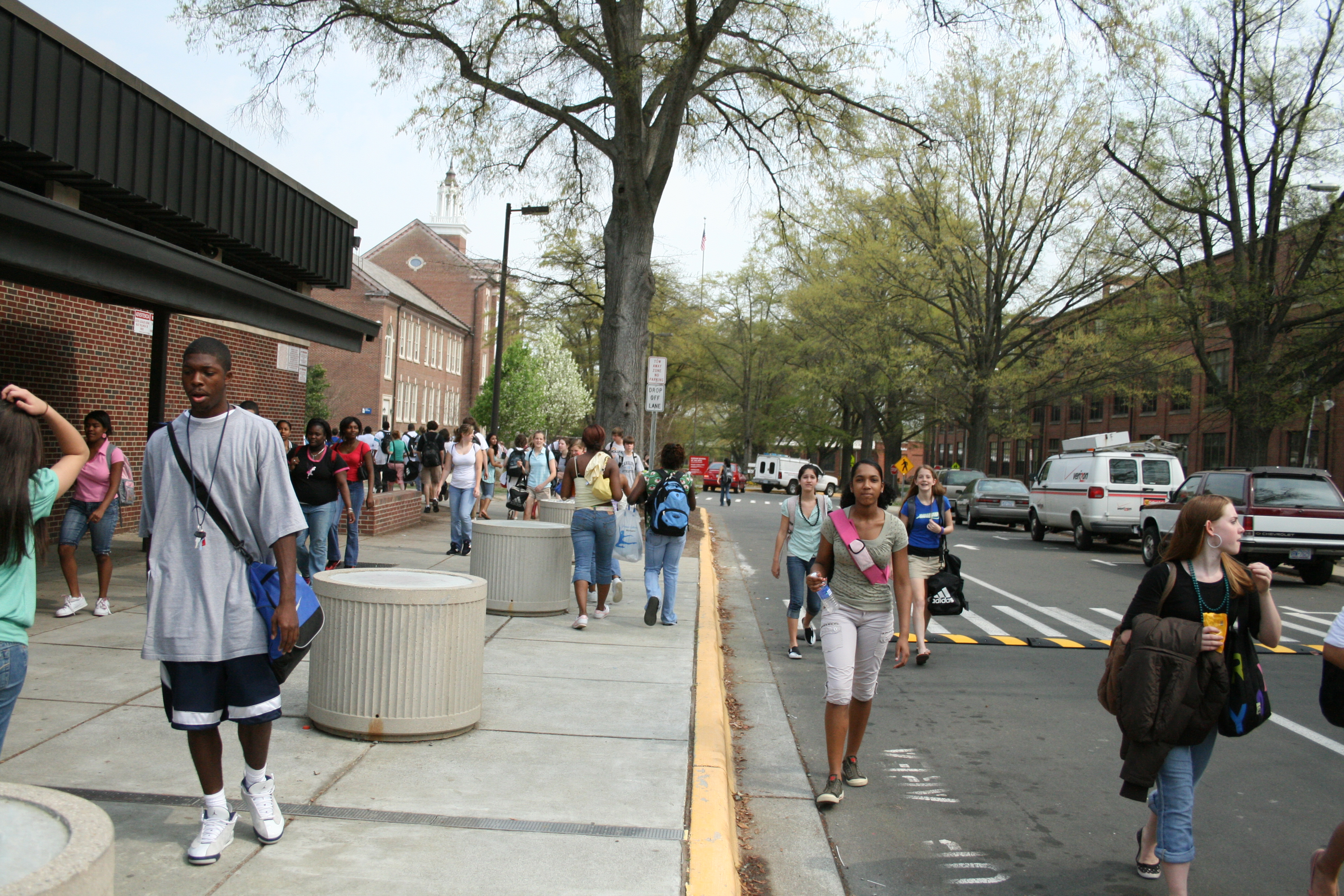
DSA has a college-like campus layout, with separate buildings and long walks between classes.

=== High school ===
High schoolers have the option of taking Advanced Placement (AP) courses. These include AP English III (Language and Composition), AP English IV (Literature and Composition), AP Statistics, AP Calculus AB, AP Physics C: Mechanics, AP Chemistry, AP Environmental Science, AP Biology, AP US History, AP World History, AP European History, AP Psychology, AP French V, AP Spanish V & VI, AP Art History, AP Studio Art, and AP Music Theory. They are also offered the opportunity to take Independent Study classes to study subjects not offered there.

High schoolers also have the option of taking honors level courses in both core classes and electives.
