= Ted G. Stone =

American evangelist

Teddy Gerald Stone (May 20, 1934 – July 16, 2006) was a Southern Baptist evangelist and former drug addict who founded his own ministry to help addicts. To raise funds and awareness of the ministry he completed three walks across the United States and was on his fourth walk when he died. He was also on the board of trustees for Southwestern Baptist Seminary, wrote for the Baptist Press, and ran for statewide leadership roles in the church in North Carolina.

== Early life and career ==
Stone was born in North Carolina to Coy F. and Sudie "Oleta" (West) Stone and had two younger brothers, Dwight and Donnie. He graduated from Durham High School before earning his Bachelor of Arts degree from Wake Forest University in 1956. While at Wake Forest, he lettered as a member of the cross-country team, was a member of Sigma Pi fraternity, won the J.B. Currin public speaking award, and was the pastor of Bell's Baptist Church. While at Bell's, he organized homeowners whose property was threatened by the proposed Jordan Lake. He went on to earn a Master of Arts degree from North Carolina Central University where he wrote a two hundred page paper on the history of Durham politics for his thesis. He also studied at Southeastern Baptist Theological Seminary and Duke University graduate school.

He married Ann Fuller on Aug. 31, 1956 in Durham County, North Carolina. They had three daughters: Ellen, Carole, and Lisa.

Stone became the associate pastor of Grace Baptist Church in Durham from 1959 to 1962. He also looked for activities outside of the ministry. He published a newspaper called Chatham Life and tried his hand at real estate, insurance, putt-putt golf, and as a florist.

== Addiction ==
Stone first became addicted to drugs while he was a minister in 1970. A friend gave him two amphetamine pills to help "make him more efficient at his job". The two pills quickly became a fifteen pill a day habit. His personality distorted, he left his church and was soon arrested on drug charges. He said he became a "criminal monster" and robbed at least four convenience stores. At the last robbery, in 1971, he shot a clerk. He was eventually caught and charged with attempted murder. He was paroled after spending four and a half years in prison.

While in prison he received psychiatric treatment from Duke University Hospital. During that time he "gave his life back to the Lord". When he was released, he promised to begin hand-delivering a message of hope to people fighting addictions.

== Ministry ==
On his release from prison, Stone refused to sit by and hope someone else would share a religious experience with people who were addicts. He began preaching about his renewed faith and how it could help others. He began the Ted Stone Ministries then wrote the autobiography "Somebody Special" in 1984 in which he detailed his journey from drugs to prison to a passion for helping people.

Stone's ministries did not go un-noticed. He met with former First Lady Betty Ford, and at least three governors: George W. Bush, Gary Johnson, and Fife Symington.

He wrote The Drug Tragedy in 1987 which was a general survey of the drug problem in America and proposed solutions. With Philip Barber, he wrote Hope for the One Who Hurts and Hope for the One Who Cares, one to provide help for people with drug addictions and the other to give help to the addict's loved ones.

In 2005 he created HIS Way Ministries as an effort to help addicts from falling back into the habits which got them addicted. HIS Way had three requirement: A church's staff and congregation must be committed to the success of the program; members of the congregation must be trained to be effective mentors and be willing to mentor for at least six months or longer; and recovering addicts must be serious about permanent recovery from their addictions. To qualify for the program, addicts had to complete a Christian treatment program and must have experienced a saving relationship with Jesus Christ.

He continually pushed Southern Baptists, and Christians in general, to assist people with addictions. At the June 2006 meeting of the Southern Baptist Convention in Greensboro, NC, he told missionary directors that "broken people" shouldn't be considered "second-class citizens in the family of God."

He believed that the Christian church held the answer to the drug abuse problem: "Most programs use something to substitute for the abuser's addiction. Some even refer to a higher power. But my message is that by putting your dependence on the Lord Jesus Christ, you can break your dependence on chemical substances." He also said that Jesus is still in the miracle working business.

== Other work ==
Stone was a two-term trustee of Southwestern Baptist Theological Seminary where he was heavily involved in establishing the Roy Fish School of Evangelism and Missions.

He was a long-time member of the Board of Visitors at Southeastern Baptist Theological Seminary in Wake Forest, NC.

He served as a member of the North Carolina Mental Health Commission for five years.

Beginning in 2001, he and Barber co-wrote a regular column for Baptist Press, where he tried to keep the afflictions of America's addicts in front of his Southern Baptist audience.

== Walks across America ==
Stone was known for walking across the country to help raise awareness for his miniseries. He tried to walk an average of 25 miles a day and he would drive up to 150 miles off his route to speak. Financing his first trip was tough. He had estimated that the trip would cost around $25,000 but the final total was approximately $32,000. Stone said, "I tried to earn my own way by speaking, sort of like Paul and his tent making. I was not sponsored for the trip. New Balance did furnish the shoes and I was grateful for reduced rates at some Holiday Inns."

On his first trip, in 1996, he walked 3,650-mile from the Capitol steps in Washington, D.C., south to Jacksonville, FL and westward to Los Angeles, CA. He spoke to almost 200 audiences along the way about the changes society must make in order to correct the problems caused by drug abuse.

His second trip, in 1998, was a 3,550-mile trek from the mayor's office in San Francisco, CA east to Virginia Beach, VA.

His third trip was in 2000. He walked 1,700-mile, south to north from Nuevo Laredo, Tamaulipas in Mexico and ended in Detroit, MI at the Ambassador Bridge leading into Canada.

He said, "The success of the walk cannot be measured in dollars. The whole purpose of the walk was to deliver a message of hope to hurting Americans and to make a mark for good in our country's battle against drug abuse." He hoped to challenge churches to help others to overcome their addictions by having an open heart for broken people.

== Death ==
Stone planned his fourth walk across the country to start in August, 2002. He planned to walk across the United States from east to west, starting in Atlantic Beach, NC. This trip was postponed after a diagnosis of colon cancer that year. He survived two surgeries and revised his plan to run from north to south. He started his trip in Chicago, IL on June 18, 2006 and planned to arrive in Pensacola, FL nine weeks and 1,100 miles later. In previous trips he had carried an American flag. On this trip he carried both an American flag and a Christian flag; one to celebrate his freedoms as an American and the other to celebrate his freedom from the bonds of addiction through God.

During the trip he lost consciousness when riding in a car from the walking route to a speaking engagement in Gallatin, TN. He did not regain consciousness and died in at Skyline Medical Center in Nashville. The Davidson County medical examiner ruled that he died of cardiovascular disease.

== Awards and recognitions ==
On March 11, 1997, US Senator Lauch Faircloth made an entry into the Congressional Record about Stone's ministry, "Ted Stone is a great American who is working to show all Americans that an individual can make a difference in the war against drug abuse."

Governor Jim Hunt awarded him the Order of the Long Leaf Pine for his contributions in the areas of mental health and drug abuse prevention.

In 2006, Stone received the Richard D. Land Distinguished Service Award from the Ethics & Religious Liberty Commission of the Southern Baptist Convention.

Two scholarship funds were established in his name. The Ted Stone Scholarship Fund for Evangelism and Missions at Southwestern Baptist Theological Seminary, and the Ted Stone Scholarship Fund at Southeastern Seminary.
