= Kate Lee Harris Adams =

American aviator

- Born: Katherine Lee Harris; September 5, 1919; Durham, North Carolina, U.S.
- Died: December 2, 2002 (aged 83); Durham, North Carolina, U.S.
- Resting place: Maplewood Cemetery
- Education: Duke University
- Occupation: Pilot
- Spouse: Robert Adams

Katherine Lee Harris Adams (September 5, 1919 – December 2, 2002), also known as Kate Adams, was an American pilot who served in the Women Airforce Service Pilots during World War II. As a member of the Women Airforce Service Pilots, she was awarded veteran status in 1977. In 2009, she was posthumously awarded the Congressional Gold Medal along with all other members of the service.

== Early life and education ==
Adams was born Katherine Lee Harris in Durham, North Carolina on September 5, 1919, to Arthur Miller Harris, a city councilman, and Kate Lee Hundley, a homemaker and former schoolteacher. She graduated from Durham High School in 1937. She attended Duke University, where she graduated in 1941 with a degree in fine arts.

== Women Airforce Service Pilots ==
While a student at Duke University, she took a Civilian Pilot Training Program course, where only one woman was accepted for every ten men accepted, and traveled from Durham to Raleigh to take flying lessons at a local airfield. Upon completion of the training program, she received a private pilot's license.

In 1943, Harris enrolled in the United States Air Force as a civilian by joining the Women Airforce Service Pilots, a civilian women's pilots organization employed by the United States federal civil service to test aircraft, ferry aircraft, and train pilots in order to free up male pilots for combat roles during World War II. She trained at Avenger Field in Sweetwater, Texas and was assigned to Napier Army Air Base in Dothan, Alabama. She flew PT-17, BT-13, AT-6, and P-40 aircraft. She conducted solo test flights, worked as an instructor for flight classes, and ferried planes from Napier to other U.S. air bases.

Following the Attack on Pearl Harbor, Adams piloted military planes and served as an instructor for flight cadets.

Adams donated her uniform and photographs from her time in the Women Airforce Service Pilots to the North Carolina Museum of History. In 1977, she and other members of the service were granted veteran status.

After her death, she and the other members of the Women Airforce Service Pilots were awarded the Congressional Gold Medal for their service during the war.

== Personal life and death ==
Adams met Lieutenant Robert Adams, a U.S. Air Force officer, while working at Napier Field. They married and, after the end of World War II, moved to Kansas City, where they lived for eight years, followed by Houston, where they lived for fifty-four years. She was an active member of St. Mark's Episcopal Church. Following her husband's death in 1999, she moved back to Durham.

She went on vacation to China and was a member of one of the first tour groups to be allowed into the country under Communist rule.

Adams died on December 2, 2002, at Croasdaile Methodist Retirement Home in Durham. Her funeral was held at her childhood church, Trinity United Methodist Church. She was buried in Maplewood Cemetery.
