= Cary Brewbaker =

American football coach (1915–1982)

Carey Lewis Brewbaker (April 16, 1915 – November 16, 1982) was an American football coach. He started coaching at Durham High School, where his teams won or shared five state championships from 1938 to 1945. He then spent eighteen years as the defensive line coach on Earle Edwards' coaching staff at North Carolina State University. North Carolina State won five Atlantic Coast Conference championships during Brewbaker's tenure. Brewbaker was inducted posthumously into the North Carolina Sports Hall of Fame in 2004.

Brewbaker was born in Buchanan, Virginia on April 16, 1915. He died in Holden Beach, North Carolina on November 16, 1982, at the age of 67.
