= Call Out the Marines =

1942 film

- Original film poster
- Directed by: Frank Ryan; William Hamilton
- Screenplay by: Frank Ryan; Andrew Bennison
- Story by: James Edward Grant
- Produced by: Howard Benedict
- Starring: Edmund Lowe; Victor McLaglen; Binnie Barnes
- Cinematography: J. Roy Hunt; Nicholas Musuraca
- Edited by: Theron Warth
- Music by: Harry Revel
- Distributed by: RKO Pictures
- Release dates: February 13, 1942 (U.S.); January 25, 1942 (Premiere-New York City)
- Running time: 67 min.
- Country: United States
- Language: English
- Budget: $425,000

Call Out the Marines is a 1942 military comedy film released by RKO in February 1942. It stars Victor McLaglen and Edmund Lowe playing the same characters with different names that they played in What Price Glory? and several sequels; however the original film trailer mentions What Price Glory? and The Cock-Eyed World. The film features extensive stock footage from RKO's Soldiers of the Sea that in some cases appear on process screens that the actors stand in front of.

== Plot ==
Ex-Marines Jimmy McGinnis (Victor McLaglen) and Harry Curtis (Edmund Lowe), who haven't seen each other for fifteen years, meet at a racetrack. They both immediately drop their jobs as an attendant and cleaner to rekindle their friendship and brawl over which one will have Violet (Binnie Barnes) for their girl. When visiting a clip joint called the Shoreleave Cafe with Violet, they meet the owner, Jim Blake (Paul Kelly). Blake was their former captain; he left the Corps under a cloud when he was blamed for a security breach. Blake is involved in espionage, arranging to buy the plans for a new amphibious vehicle.

Jimmy and Harry are called back to active service as gunnery sergeants with the 6th Marines where they crash the spy ring. The fast-paced comedy uses the spy plot as merely an excuse for five musical numbers by Harry Revel and a variety of comedy sequences, such as barroom brawls over thrown garters, spies and policemen with speech impediments, and jeep, motorcycle and car chases.

== Cast ==
- Victor McLaglen as Jimmy McGinnis
- Edmund Lowe as Harry Curtis
- Binnie Barnes as Violet 'Vi' Hall
- Paul Kelly as Jim Blake
- Robert Smith as PFC Billy Harrison
- Dorothy Lovett as Mary
- Franklin Pangborn as Wilbur the Waiter
- Corinna Mura as Zana Zaranda
- George Cleveland as Bartender
- The King's Men as Quartet
- Nora Cecil As Elderly Woman With Glasses
- Florence Gill As Elderly Girl Who Wants To See Horses
- Six Hits and a Miss as Singing Group

== Production ==
With the introduction of conscription in the United States and World War II in the news, the majority of American minor and major film studios made comedies about military service. RKO's Call Out the Marines had a troubled production history with different stars and technicians announced in trade papers of the time for the film. The United States Marine Corps, which had initially cooperated with the producers, was outraged over the completed film in December 1941 and ordered the film shelved as "bad for morale". However it was released after America entered the war.
