= Maplewood Cemetery (Durham, North Carolina) =

Cemetery in Durham, North Carolina

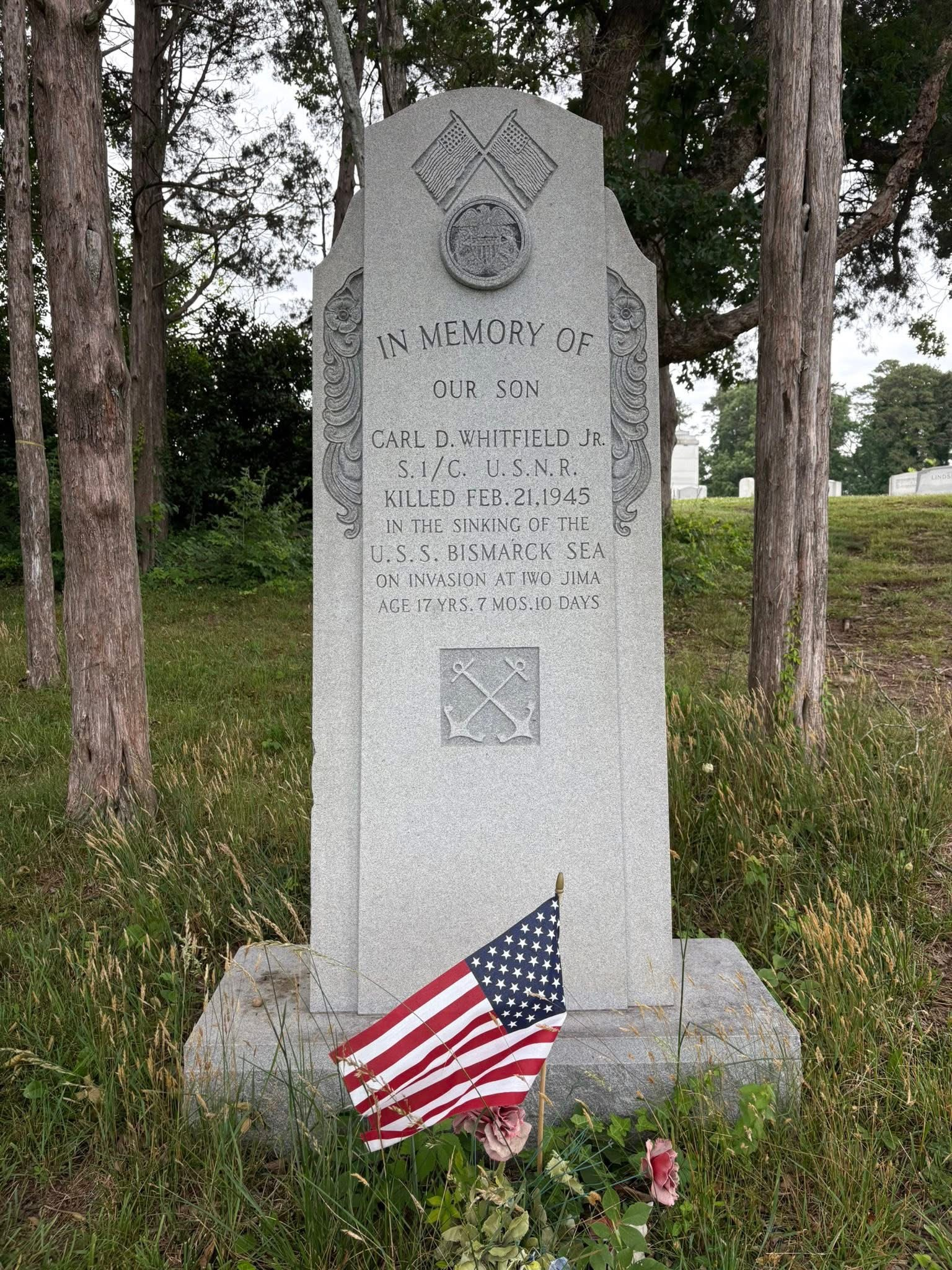
- World War II memorial honoring Carl D. Whitfield Jr. in Maplewood Cemetery
- Interactive map of Maplewood Cemetery

Details
- Established: 1872
- Location: 1621 Duke University Road; Durham, North Carolina
- Country: United States
- Coordinates: 35°59′37″N 78°55′33″W
- Owned by: City of Durham
- Size: 120 acres (49 ha)
- No. of graves: > 22,000
- Website: Maplewood Cemetery
- Find a Grave: Maplewood Cemetery

Maplewood Cemetery is a historic cemetery in Durham, North Carolina. Many notable local politicians, industrialists, and civic leaders are buried in the cemetery.

== History ==
Maplewood Cemetery was established in Durham's West End neighborhood in 1872. The land was previously owned by William H. Willard, who received $1500 in the sale. The cemetery was historically for Whites, and served Durham's upper-class families during racial segregation, with Beechwood Cemetery serving the prominent families within the Black community.

A section of the cemetery, known as the World War Veterans Plot, is dedicated to veterans of World War I, World War II, and the Korean War.

The cemetery includes graves of forty Confederate States Army and Confederate States Navy veterans of the American Civil War. In 2015, the Sons of Confederate Veterans spent $3,000 to build a Confederate memorial at the cemetery. The granite block with a bronze plaque was vandalized with graffiti written across it saying "Black Lives Matter" and "Tear It Down". It was vandalized a second time in 2019, with "cement or another hard substance" smeared across the plaque.

== Notable burials ==
- Kate Lee Harris Adams (1919–2002), Women Airforce Service Pilot during World War II
- Doc Adkins (1872–1934), baseball player
- Mary Duke Biddle (1887–1960), heiress and philanthropist
- William T. Blackwell (1839–1903), industrialist and founder of the W. T. Blackwell and Company
- Joseph Penn Breedlove (1874–1955), librarian and author
- Wilbur Wade Card (1873–1948), baseball player
- Isaac M. Carpenter (1920–1998), jazz musician
- George Watts Carr (1893–1975), architect
- George Watts Carr Jr. (1918–2006), businessman
- Julian S. Carr (1845–1924), industrialist
- Angier Biddle Duke (1915–1995), diplomat
- Angier Buchanan Duke (1884–1923), trustee of Duke University
- Washington Duke (1820–1905), industrialist and philanthropist (originally buried here but later re-interred in Duke Chapel)
- Bartlett S. Durham (1824–1859), physician, farmer, businessman (originally buried in Antioch Cemetery and later re-interred here)
- Richard B. Fitzgerald (1843–1918), brick-maker and businessman
- John Wesley Fletcher (1940–1996), Protestant pastor
- John Sprunt Hill (1869–1961), lawyer, politician, banker, and philanthropist
- Eugene Morehead (1845–1889), banker
- Anita Morris (1943–1994) actress, dancer, and singer
- Edward James Parrish (1846–1920), industrialist
- Kathleen Peterson (1953–2001), business executive and murder victim
- Marty Ravellette (1939–2007), subject of the documentary No Arms Needed: A Hero Among Us
- Kenneth Claiborne Royall Jr. (1918–1999), politician and businessman
- Mary Duke Biddle Trent Semans (1920–2012), heiress, philanthropist, activist, and politician
- James H. Southgate (1859–1916), politician and prohibitionist
- Wallace Wade (1892–1986), football coach
- Mamie Dowd Walker (1880–1960), first woman judge in North Carolina
- George Washington Watts (1851–1921), industrialist and philanthropist
- Richard H. Wright (1851–1929), industrialist
