= Mary Semans =

American heiress and philanthropist (1920–2012)

Mary Duke Biddle Trent Semans

Mayor Pro Tempore of Durham, North Carolina
- In office 1953–1955

Personal details
- Born: Mary Duke Biddle; February 21, 1920 New York City
- Died: January 25, 2012 (aged 91) Duke University Hospital, Durham, North Carolina, U.S.
- Resting place: Maplewood Cemetery
- Spouse(s): Josiah Charles Trent (1938–48); James Semans (1953–2005)
- Children: Mary Trent Jones; Sarah Trent Harris; Rebecca Trent Kirkland; Barbara Trent Kimbrell; Jenny Semans Koortbojian; James Duke Biddle Trent Semans; Beth Semans Hubbard
- Parent(s): Anthony J. Drexel Biddle, Jr. Mary Duke Biddle
- Relatives: Anthony Joseph Drexel Biddle, Sr. (grandfather); Benjamin Newton Duke (grandfather); Washington Duke (great-grandfather)
- Education: Duke University (A.B. 1939)
- Known for: Philanthropy

Mary Duke Biddle Trent Semans (February 21, 1920 – January 25, 2012) was an American heiress, activist, politician, and philanthropist. She was the granddaughter of Benjamin N. Duke and the great-granddaughter of Washington Duke, both tobacco and energy tycoons who helped start Duke University. Semans supported the arts and humanities through various philanthropic entities. She was a dedicated civil rights activist, and ran for the Durham City Council on a platform dedicated to increasing voter registration among African-Americans. She was the first woman to serve as mayor pro tempore of Durham.

== Life ==
=== Early life ===
Mary Duke Biddle was born in 1920 in New York City to Mary Lillian Duke Biddle and Anthony J. Drexel Biddle, Jr., and she lived a comfortable early life as the daughter of wealthy and prominent parents. Her mother was an aspiring opera singer and her father a retired World War I captain and a US ambassador. As a girl she learned to play the piano and attended the Hewitt School in New York. When she was fourteen years old, her parents divorced and she moved to Durham, North Carolina, to live with her grandmother.

=== College and later life ===
In 1935 she enrolled at Duke's Women's College where she met Josiah Charles Trent, a then medical student who eventually became the chief of Duke Hospital's Division of Thoracic Surgery. Mary and Josiah married in 1938 and together they had four daughters. The next year, Mary graduated from Duke, receiving a degree in Art History. However, just nine years later in 1948, Josiah died of lymphoma, leaving Mary a widow with four girls.

Pushed by her mother and with the support of her childhood governess, Mary went back to Duke University as a student for three more semesters. While back at Duke, she met James Hustead Semans, a urologic surgeon visiting from Atlanta. Five years later Mary remarried to James, who that year joined Duke's medical faculty. Together they had three children.

=== Exposure to the arts ===
Later in life Semans was known for her support of the arts, a love for which she said she had had her entire life.

Growing up in New York City, Semans listened daily to her mother's opera singing and took private piano and dance lessons of her own. This exposure to music, along with frequent trips with her governess to opera houses, theatres, and the Metropolitan Museum of Art gave Semans an appreciation for art at an early age. While at one point she considered becoming a professional pianist, Semans stopped playing in college, a decision she said she later regretted. In an interview with North Carolina public television, Semans said that her love of the arts in combination with the Carolina area's lack of support for them inspired much of her philanthropic work.

=== Political career ===
For some time, Mary Duke Semans played an active role in the Durham City Government, although she never served in a post higher than a local office. In 1951 she ran alongside Kathrine Everett for seats on the city council. They were both elected and became the first two women ever on the board.

From 1953-55 she then served as Durham's mayor pro tempore, again Durham's first woman elected to such a post. While in office, she spent much of her time pushing for civil rights, funding for the arts, and affordable housing and healthcare.

== Philanthropy ==
Semans created and supported many institutions at Duke University, in her hometown Durham, and in the larger State of North Carolina. Through these institutions Semans spent most of her life funding and promoting education, arts, and human rights in general.

=== Duke University ===
Mary Semans financially supported many projects at her alma mater Duke University throughout her life. She spent many years as chair of the Mary Duke Biddle Foundation, started by and named after her mother, and she served 45 years as a trustee of The Duke Endowment. In 1982 she became the Endowment's first female chair, a position she retained until 2001. Through her position she started the Josiah Charles Trent Memorial Foundation, the Josiah Charles Trent Collection of the History of Medicine, and the Mary Duke Biddle Scholarship.

These projects were named after Josiah Trent, Semans's first husband, and Mary Duke Biddle, Semans's mother. She was also instrumental in the creation of the Duke University Museum of Art (later the Nasher Museum) and helped start Duke's Center for Medieval and Renaissance Studies.

=== Support for the arts ===
Growing up surrounded by the arts but finding herself in a city and area lacking them, Mary Semans and her husband concentrated much of their philanthropic energy towards supporting the arts. In 1956 Semans's mother, Mary Duke Biddle, started the Mary Duke Biddle Foundation, and the next year Semans became trustee. A few years later in 1960, Mary Duke Biddle died and Dr. and Mrs. Semans became chairman and vice-chairwoman of the foundation. Through membership on this board they helped support many arts and cultural programs in New York City, the Carolinas, and Duke University.

The first of these programs, started in 1964 and named after Dr. Semans's parents, was an art collection at Duke University. Later in the 1960s Semans and her husband then helped start the University of North Carolina School of the Arts in Winston-Salem, North Carolina. At the time, the NC School of the Arts was the first publicly funded art school in North Carolina.

In 1982, the same year Semans became President of the Duke Endowment, she and her husband established another two foundations but in their own names. The first, the Mary DBT Foundation, was founded as a general-purpose foundation for applicants, often artists, who couldn't find funding for projects elsewhere. The second, the Duke-Semans Fine Arts Foundation, was created very specifically to send artwork on tour to places that would otherwise never receive any. Of this second foundation, Mary Semans was the treasurer and Dr. Semans the President.

Later in life, at age 77, one of Semans's last projects was the creation of the Semans Art Fund at the North Carolina School of the Arts. Through this foundation Semans could support individual NCSA students in their artistic endeavors, including student funding for research, summer tuition, performances, and special projects. Semans later said that of all her projects, the Semans Art Fund was closest to her heart. She said that like the students, she and her husband "needed to express [them]selves," and being able to help the students in their endeavors fulfilled that need.

== Civil rights advocacy ==
Though from a sheltered, upper-class background, Semans was known throughout her life as both a political and personal advocate for social rights. In an interview, she claimed to have first entered her city's political scene after attending a precinct meeting and seeing a racial division in a decision that would help Durham African Americans register to vote. Her involvement in that meeting led her to run for the City Council and eventually as Mayor Pro Tempore of Durham on a platform of black voter registration. Semans also served for 28 years as a trustee of Lincoln Community Hospital, a hospital started in 1901 by her family to serve Durham's African-American population.

== Duke family ==
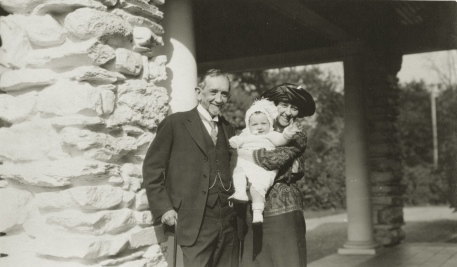
An infant Mary Semans with mother Mary Duke Biddle and grandfather Benjamin Newton Duke

Mary Duke Semans's family along the Duke lineage was famous for its wealth and philanthropy before Mary was born, starting a tradition she continued and influencing much of her life's work.

=== Family wealth ===
The wealth of the Dukes first came into being through Washington Duke and the tobacco industry. Returning from the Civil War, Duke began traveling and selling tobacco from a wagon, and in 1874 he moved to Durham, NC with his family to expand his business and start W. Duke, Sons & Company.

Facing competition from other tobacco manufacturers, the youngest of Duke's sons, James B. Duke, convinced his father to buy machines to make ready-made cigarettes, and within five years the W. Duke, Sons & Company became the largest manufacturer of cigarettes in the United States. Under the direction of James Duke it then merged with four other manufacturers to become the multinational American Tobacco Company. Later in 1905, James Duke worked with his brothers to create a second empire in hydroelectric power as an outgrowth of Duke investments in North Carolina's booming textile industry. They poured millions of dollars into hydroelectric infrastructure of the Carolinas, creating the Southern Power Company and what is now the United States' largest electric power holding company, the Duke Power Company.

=== Philanthropic leanings ===
As the Dukes made money, they, somewhat unusually for the time, began to give much of their money to charitable causes. Washington Duke first came to philanthropy through the Methodist church, although he was influenced by the larger Social Gospel movement and had interest in quieting critics of his tobacco trust. The Duke family was involved in Methodist churches around Durham before they ever lived in the city, and over time much Duke money was spent on Methodist causes and the creation of Methodist churches. The biggest of these donations, encouraged mostly by Benjamin Duke, was $85,000 to Trinity College of Randolph County in effort to move it to Durham.

In 1896, the Dukes gave Trinity College an additional $100,000 on the basis of admitting women, and accepting the offer, Trinity College received similar amounts in years following. In 1924, James B. Duke, the youngest son of Washington Duke, supported the vision of the then Trinity College President Dr. William Few and created the Duke Endowment with $40 million. The Duke Endowment then incorporated Trinity College into Duke University, named after James's father. Later in her life, Mary Duke Semans would spend much time as the chairwoman of this still-existing Duke Endowment.

== Influences ==
Semans's family, deeply connected to Duke University and philanthropy, greatly influenced what would become her own legacy. Starting with Washington Duke and continuing down to Semans's mother, the Duke's wealth and connections to Durham and North Carolina prompted them to spend much time and money giving to various causes. This history was not lost on Semans as she expanded upon their efforts: continuing Duke support of Duke University and concentrating especially on the arts.

Semans also claimed that what first prompted her altruistic behavior was her experience in the Great Depression. While she and her family were not greatly affected, it was then when she first gained knowledge of others' terrible needs, leading her to believe that those of affluence have a responsibility to give.

== Awards ==
Semans earned much recognition for her work. By the end of her life she had received the Duke University Medal for Distinguished Meritorious Service, the National Brotherhood Award from the National Conference of Christians and Jews, the University Award from the University of North Carolina, the John Tyler Caldwell Award for the Humanities from the North Carolina Humanities Council, and the Hadassa Medical Center's Freedom Award, and in 2009 she was inducted into the North Carolina Women's Hall of Fame. She has also received honorary degrees from North Carolina Central University, Davidson College, Elon University, Shaw University, Pfeiffer University, Campbell University, UNC-Chapel Hill, and N.C. Wesleyan College.

Dr. Mary Duke Biddle Trent Semans was recognized as a Main Honoree by the Sesquicentennial Honors Commission at the Durham 150 Closing Ceremony in Durham, NC on November 2, 2019. The posthumous recognition was bestowed upon 29 individuals "whose dedication, accomplishments and passion have helped shape Durham in important ways." The lichen species Parmelia semansiana was named in her honour by William and Chicita Culberson, both researchers at Duke University.

== Death ==
Semans died on January 25, 2012, at age 91 in Duke Hospital in Durham, North Carolina. The exact cause of death was not published.

== Legacy ==
Semans became involved with and started many charitable organizations throughout her life. She dedicated nearly her entire life to philanthropic work, yet she could never bear to think of her work as philanthropy. When asked for a reflection on her work, she replied that she "see[s] that word [philanthropy] all the time," but never thought it applied to her. She was simply "giv[ing] to so and so" at times when they needed it.
