= Anthony Joseph Drexel Biddle Sr. =

American philanthropist

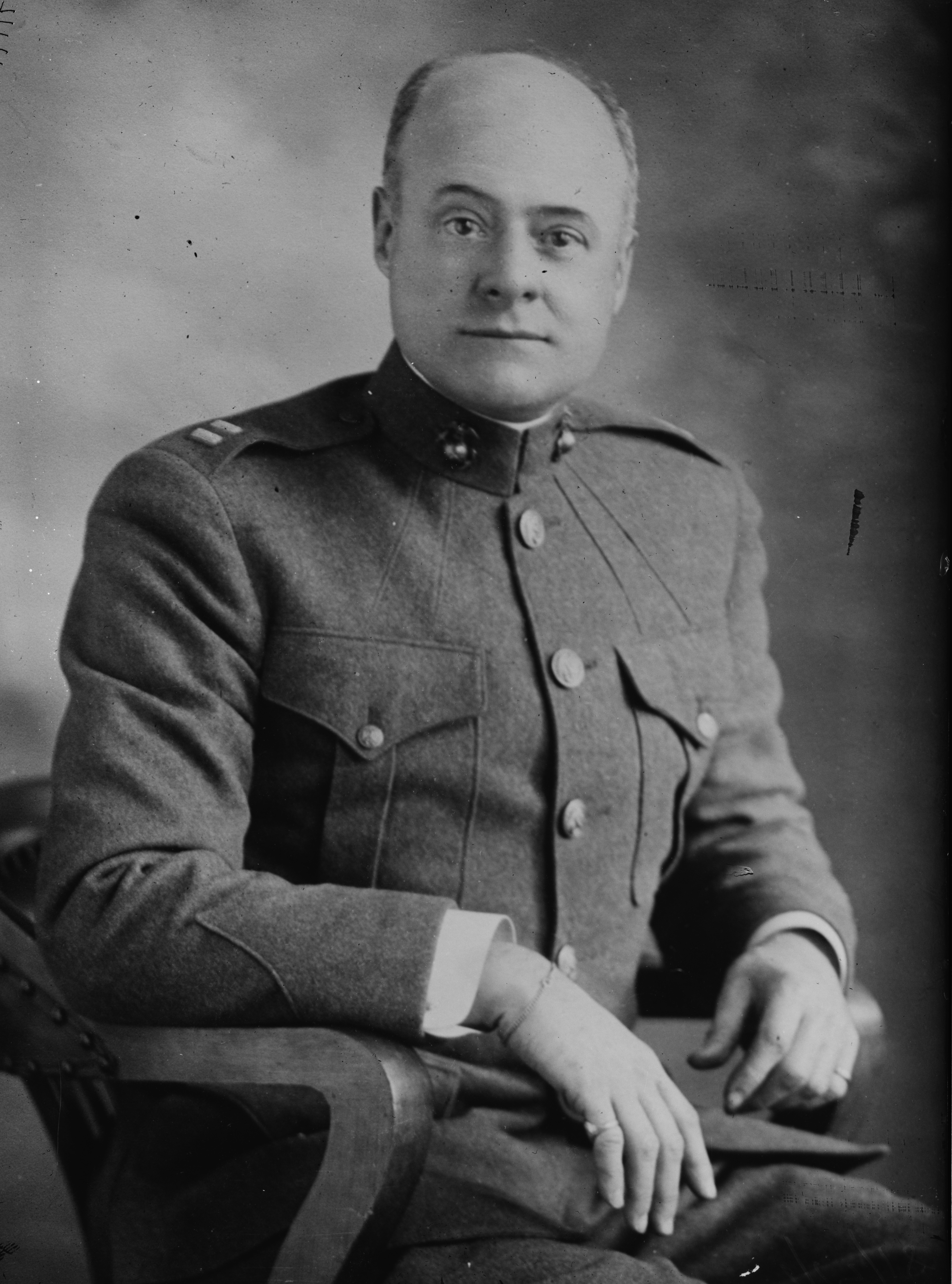
- Biddle in 1918
- Born: October 1, 1874; Philadelphia, Pennsylvania, U.S.
- Died: May 27, 1948 (aged 73); Philadelphia, Pennsylvania, U.S.
- Resting place: The Woodlands (Philadelphia, Pennsylvania)
- Spouse: Cordelia Rundell Bradley
- Children: Anthony Joseph Drexel Biddle Jr. (1897–1961); Cordelia Drexel Biddle (1898–1984); Livingston Ludlow Biddle (1899–1981)
- Parent(s): Edward Biddle II; Emily Drexel
- Relatives: Anthony Joseph Drexel (grandfather); Nicholas Biddle (great-grandfather)

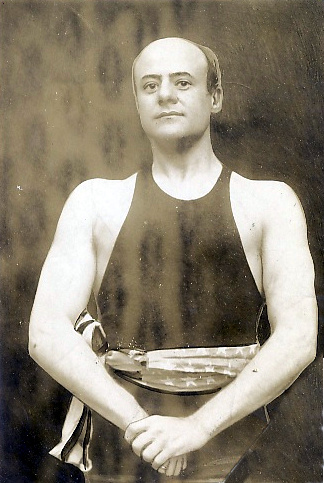
Biddle as a boxer in 1909

Anthony Joseph Drexel Biddle Sr. (October 1, 1874 – May 27, 1948) was a millionaire whose fortune allowed him to pursue theatricals, self-published writing, athletics, and Christianity on a full-time basis.

He trained men in hand-to-hand combat in both World Wars, was a fellow of the American Geographical Society and founded a movement called "Athletic Christianity" that eventually attracted 300,000 members around the world. Sports Illustrated called him "boxing's greatest amateur" in 1955, as well as a "major factor in the re-establishment of boxing as a legal and, at that time, estimable sport."

A fictionalized Biddle appears in the 1967 Disney musical film The Happiest Millionaire.

== Early life ==
He was born on October 1, 1874, in Philadelphia, Pennsylvania, to Edward Biddle II and Emily Drexel. He was a grandson of banker Anthony Joseph Drexel, and a great-grandson of banker Nicholas Biddle. Biddle was a graduate of Germany's Heidelberg University.

== Career ==
An officer in the United States Marine Corps, Biddle was an expert in close-quarters fighting and the author of Do or Die: A Supplementary Manual on Individual Combat, a book on combat methods, including knives and empty-hand skills, training both the United States Marine Corps in two world wars and special agents of the Federal Bureau of Investigation. He can be seen training Marines in the RKO short documentary Soldiers of the Sea. He was considered not just an expert in fighting, but also a pioneer of United States Marine Corps training in the bayonet and hand-to-hand combat. He based his style on fencing, though this approach was sometimes criticized as being unrealistic for military combat.

Having joined the Marines in 1917 at the age of 41, he also convinced his superiors to include boxing in Marine Corps recruit training. In 1919, he was promoted to the rank of major, and became a lieutenant colonel in 1934. In Lansdowne, Pennsylvania, right outside of Philadelphia, Biddle opened a military training facility, where he trained 4,000 men. His training included long hours of calisthenics and gymnastics, and taught skills such as machete, saber, dagger, and bayonet combat, as well as hand grenade use, boxing, wrestling, savate and jiujitsu. He also served two years in the National Guard.

A keen boxer, Biddle sparred with Jack Johnson and taught boxing to Gene Tunney. He even hosted "boxing teas" in his home, where other boxers would spar a couple of rounds with him and then join the family for dinner. A February 1909 match with Philadelphia Jack O'Brien was attended by society leaders including women in elegant evening gowns.

He served as a judge in the fight between Jack Dempsey and Jess Willard on July 4, 1919.

On February 5, 1920, Biddle, as chairman of the Army Navy and Civilian Board of Boxing Control of New York, became a member the International Boxing Union.

During World War II, Biddle returned to active duty with the Marine Corps with the rank of colonel and taught hand-to-hand combat to recruits.

=== Writings ===
Biddle also worked in and on periodicals. He spent time as a sports reporter for the Public Ledger, and jokingly referred to himself as "the poorest and richest reporter in Philadelphia". He also revived the Philadelphia Sunday Graphic for a short interval, before it was forced to fold, and founded a short-lived "society weekly"-type publication, The People. After organizing the also short-lived Drexel Biddle Publishing House, he acted as its head for two years.

Books written by Biddle include:

- A dual rôle: and other stories. The Warwick Book Publishing Company. 1894.
- The Madeira Islands. Philadelphia: Drexel, Biddle & Bradley Publishing Company. 1896.
- Shantytown Sketches. Philadelphia: Drexel, Biddle & Bradley Publishing Company. 1897.
- The Froggy Fairy Book (1896) and The Second Froggy Fairy Book (1900) Drexel, Biddle & Bradley publishing company
- The Flowers of Life. Philadelphia: Drexel, Biddle & Bradley Publishing Company. 1897.
- Word for Word and Letter for Letter; a biographical romance. Gay & Bird. 1898.
- The Land of the Wine. London: The Author's Syndicate. 1901.
- Do or Die: A Supplementary Manual on Individual Combat. U.S. Marine Corps. 1937. (reprinted 1944 with new material, reprinted 1975)

== Personal life ==
In 1895, he married Cordelia Rundell Bradley. Together, they had:

- Anthony Joseph Drexel Biddle Jr. (1897–1961), who married Mary Duke (1887–1960). They were the parents of Mary Duke Biddle (1920–2012) and Nicholas Benjamin Duke Biddle.
- Cordelia Drexel Biddle (1898–1984), who married firstly Angier Buchanan Duke (1884–1923), the son of Benjamin Newton Duke. They were the parents of Angier Biddle Duke (1915–1995) and Anthony Drexel Duke (1918–2014). Her second marriage was to then architect Thomas Markoe Robertson in 1924.
- Livingston Ludlow Biddle (1899–1981), who married Kate Raboteau Page (born 1903), daughter of Robert N. Page. They were the parents of Livingston Ludlow Biddle III. Kate obtained a divorce in Reno in 1937, citing cruelty. Biddle married Suzanne Hutchinson Burke (1909–2000) whose mother was Mary Forbes Fay, the daughter of Alford Forbes Fay (1843–1881). Suzanne donated two paintings by Jane Stuart of her mother and great uncle Sigourney Webster Fay (1836–1908) to the Boston Athenaeum in 1983. Monsignor Cyril Sigourney Webster Fay (1875–1919) was her uncle; he was an early mentor to author F. Scott Fitzgerald.

He died May 27, 1948, from a cerebral hemorrhage and uremic poisoning and is interred at the Woodlands Cemetery in Philadelphia.

== Legacy ==
His daughter Cordelia Drexel Biddle collaborated with Kyle Crichton (father of Robert Crichton) to write the 1955 novel My Philadelphia Father, based on her family. The book was adapted as a stage play starring Walter Pidgeon in 1956. The story of the eccentric millionaire patriarch was adapted as a musical film in 1967, with Fred MacMurray portraying Biddle in The Happiest Millionaire, the last film to have personal involvement from Walt Disney. The book Anthony Joseph Drexel Biddle Sr.: Pioneer of Combatives in the U.S.A. was published in 2023.

== See also ==
- Muscular Christianity
