= Soldiers of the Sea =

1939 film by Frederic Ullman Jr.

The film

Soldiers of the Sea is a 1939 RKO-Pathe News two-reeler short subject narrative featuring the United States Marine Corps.

It was produced by Frederic Ullman Jr. and supervised by Frank Donovan. Through narration and film footage, the film shows and tells the history, mission statement, capabilities, equipment, and training of the United States Marines. Its musical score was provided by the United States Marine Band.

It was shown alongside feature films such as Five Came Back.

Many sequences of the film were used in RKO's Victor McLaglen and Edmund Lowe's 1941 comedy Call Out the Marines.

== Subject matter ==
The film begins with an aerial view of Marine Corps Recruit Depot San Diego. Recruit Training and the Sea School of the Marines are shown along with sequences of rowing whaleboats, foot drill and bayonet fighting conducted by Lieutenant Colonel Anthony J. Drexel Biddle.

Marines are shown on shooting ranges firing M1903 Springfield rifles and M1917 Browning machine guns. The machine gunners are shown firing at targets on the range held up by a visible Marine laying downrange of the weapon and an officer walking up to the firing weapon holding the target in his hand as the machine gun bullets hit it.

United States Marine Corps Aviation is featured with scenes of the VMF-2 squadron of Grumman F3F biplanes accompanied by narration of its increasing role and importance after the years.

The roles of Marines on the U.S. Navy's capital ships are discussed with scenes of a ship's detachment on an aircraft carrier.

The Fleet Marine Force is seen conducting an amphibious warfare landing operation. In addition to their portable 75mm M116 howitzers, the landing force has communications specialists calling for naval gunfire support from offshore ships as well as the onshore artillery by radio and flag semaphore. The advancing Marines demonstrate their expertise in military camouflage and chemical warfare.

The film ends with an inspection of the 6th Marine Regiment by Commandant of the Marine Corps Major General Thomas Holcomb and a military parade of the 2nd Marine Brigade featuring antiaircraft searchlights and guns.

== Availability ==
The short is a feature of the DVD The Crucible: Making Marines for the 21st Century.
