= Horse Marines =

The term Horse Marines has been used to describe cavalry soldiers capturing ships, or mounted marines operating ashore.

== Texas Revolution ==
The name horse marines was first used by Colonel Edward J. Wilson in the Kentucky Gazette to describe a group of mounted volunteer rangers during the Texas Revolution. Under the direction of Thomas Jefferson Rusk these horse marines patrolled the Texas coast in anticipation of a landing of Mexican troops. On 2 June 1836 a company of horse marines found the schooner Watchman in Copano Bay loaded with supplies for the Mexican armies. The horse marines captured Watchman, and used it to capture the schooners Comanche and Fanny Butler which were also carrying supplies for the Mexican armies. The captured schooners were sailed to Galveston as prizes. These American-owned ships were later returned to their owners; but their cargo of food, weapons and ammunition were retained by the rebellious Texans.

On October 14, 1871, Warren Angus Ferris published an article in the Dallas Herald, entitled "The Horse Marines" detailing a mission attended by his brother, Charles Drake Ferris and Major Isaac W. Burton during the struggle for Texas Independence. This story and a more detailed story of Charles Drake Ferris is discussed in the Warren Angus Ferris Ancestry blog. https://ferrisancestry.blog/ .

== United States Marine Corps ==
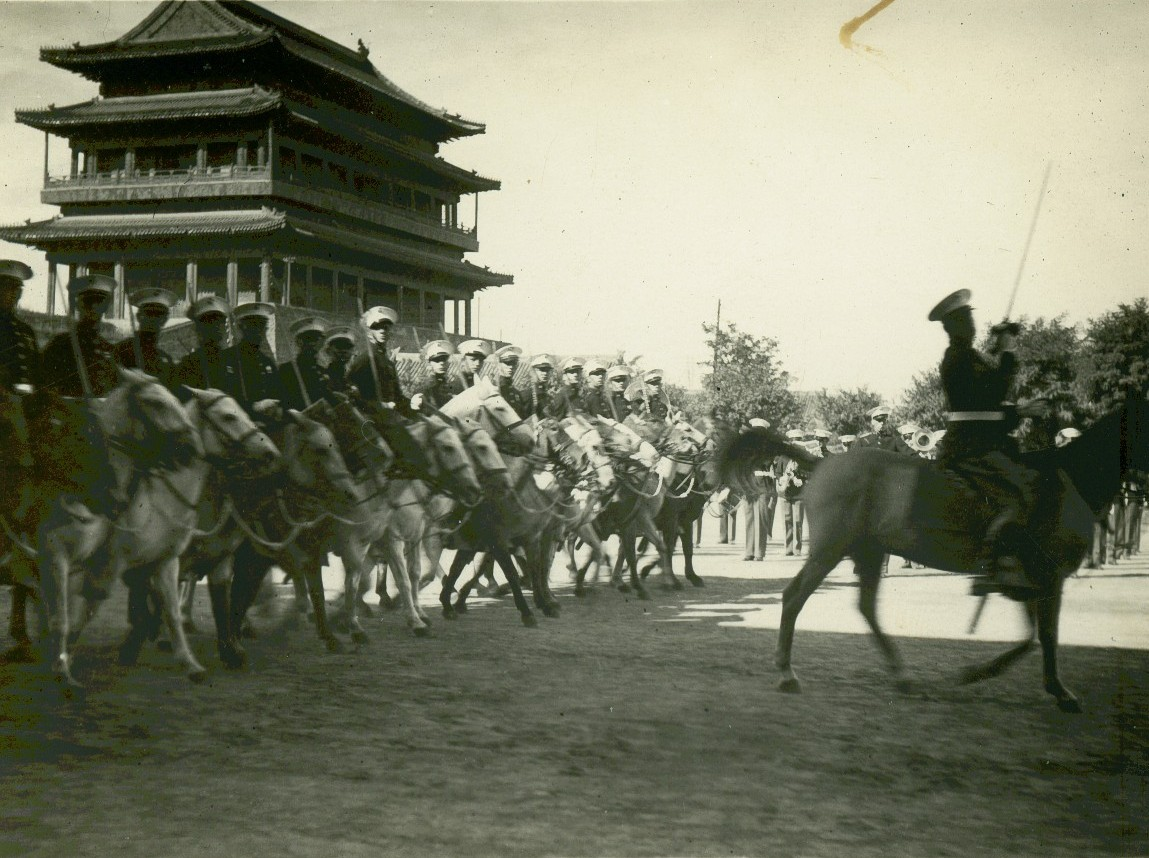
Mounted Marines with sabers on parade in Peking about 1936

The United States Marine Corps later formed a mounted detachment of horse Marines in Peking, China, as a courier service during the 1911 Revolution. When the Marines assumed Legation guard duty in 1905, they took possession of a quartermaster compound with a corral and stables plus 31 halters and assorted horse tack from the 9th Infantry. After training with donkeys, Marines on M1859 McClellan saddles rode Mongolian horses weighing 650–725 lb (295–329 kg) and standing about 13 h (1.3 m) high. Marines weighing no more than 170 lb (77 kg) were selected for their knowledge of horsemanship. The detachment of sixteen men was designated a unit of the American Legation Guard in February 1912. In support of their primary mission of rescuing Americans in distress outside of the Tartar Wall, the horse Marines kept in contact with Americans living in or near Peking by conducting an annual census updated with weekly checks. In addition to an M1911 pistol, mounted Marines were the last American military unit to actually use the Model 1913 Cavalry Saber. When disbanded on 20 February 1938 following outbreak of the Second Sino-Japanese War the detachment had grown to 32 men armed with eight Browning Automatic Rifles, three Thompson submachine guns, twenty M1903 Springfield rifles, and an M1917 Browning machine gun. Notable commanders of the detachment included James Devereux and Chesty Puller.

Although the horse Marines of Peking were the Corps' only officially designated cavalry detachment, horse Marines served in Nicaragua during the Second Nicaraguan Campaign of 1927. In Africa during the First Barbary War 1805-05 and in the diplomatic mission to Abyssinia in 1903, mounted Marine detachments used camels. A mounted color guard of Marines stationed at Marine Corps Logistics Base Barstow appeared at rodeos and events such as the Rose Parade into the 21st century.
