= Bartlett S. Durham =

American businessman

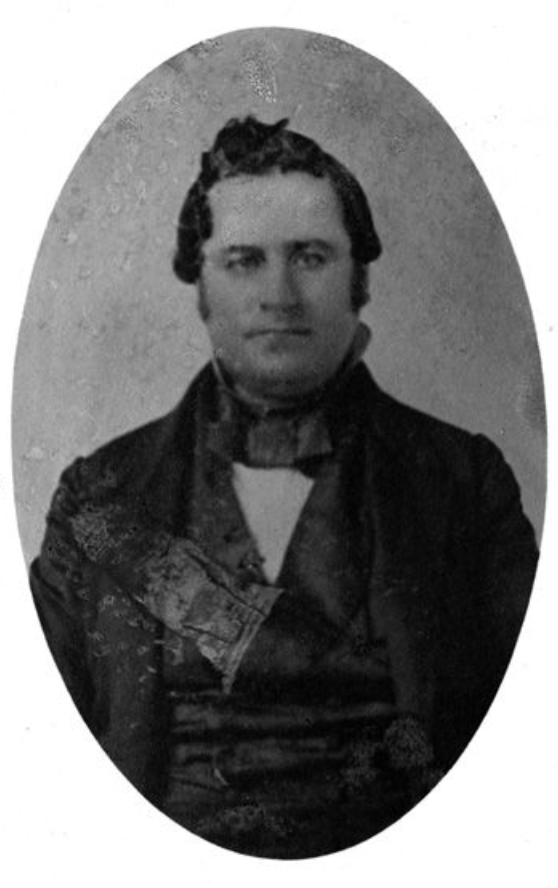
- Born: Bartlett Leonidas Snipes Durham; November 3, 1824; Orange County, North Carolina, US
- Died: February 2, 1859 (aged 34); Orange County, North Carolina, US
- Resting place: Maplewood Cemetery
- Education: University of Pennsylvania
- Occupation: medical doctor
- Known for: Eponym of Durham, North Carolina and Durham County, North Carolina
- Parent(s): William Lindsey Durham, Jr. and Mary Snipes

Bartlett Leonidas Snipes Durham (November 3, 1824 – February 2, 1859) was an American medical doctor and entrepreneur whose land, donated for a railway station, became the location of Durham, North Carolina, named for him.

== Biography ==
Bartlett S. Durham was born and raised roughly 12 miles (19 km) west of Chapel Hill, North Carolina, in rural Orange County. After graduating from the University of Pennsylvania Medical School, he returned to Orange County and, in 1847 or 1848, purchased 100 acres (40 ha) of undeveloped land in the eastern portion of the county, between settlements known as Prattsburg and Pinhook, likely as a speculative investment, in advance of the planned North Carolina Railroad. In 1849, Durham donated 4 acres (1.6 ha), directly adjacent to his estate, "Pandora's Box", to the railroad. The railroad, in turn, named the stop, Durham's Station in his honor.

The collection of stores and houses a mile to the west of Prattsburg became "Durhamville" and the site of the new station by the early 1850s. Shortly thereafter, Durham became the first railroad agent in the vicinity of Durhamville, with a liquor license and a stake in the general store. At some point during the early 1850s, Durham was elected to represent Orange County in the North Carolina General Assembly, having introduced a bill to form a chapter of the Sons of Temperance.

Bartlett Durham died from pneumonia on February 2, 1859. Ten years later, fueled by the post-Civil War tobacco boom, the North Carolina General Assembly incorporated Durham on the site of the railway station named in his honor. Twelve years after that, the eastern portion of Orange County and the western tip of Wake County were combined to form Durham County.

== Final resting place ==
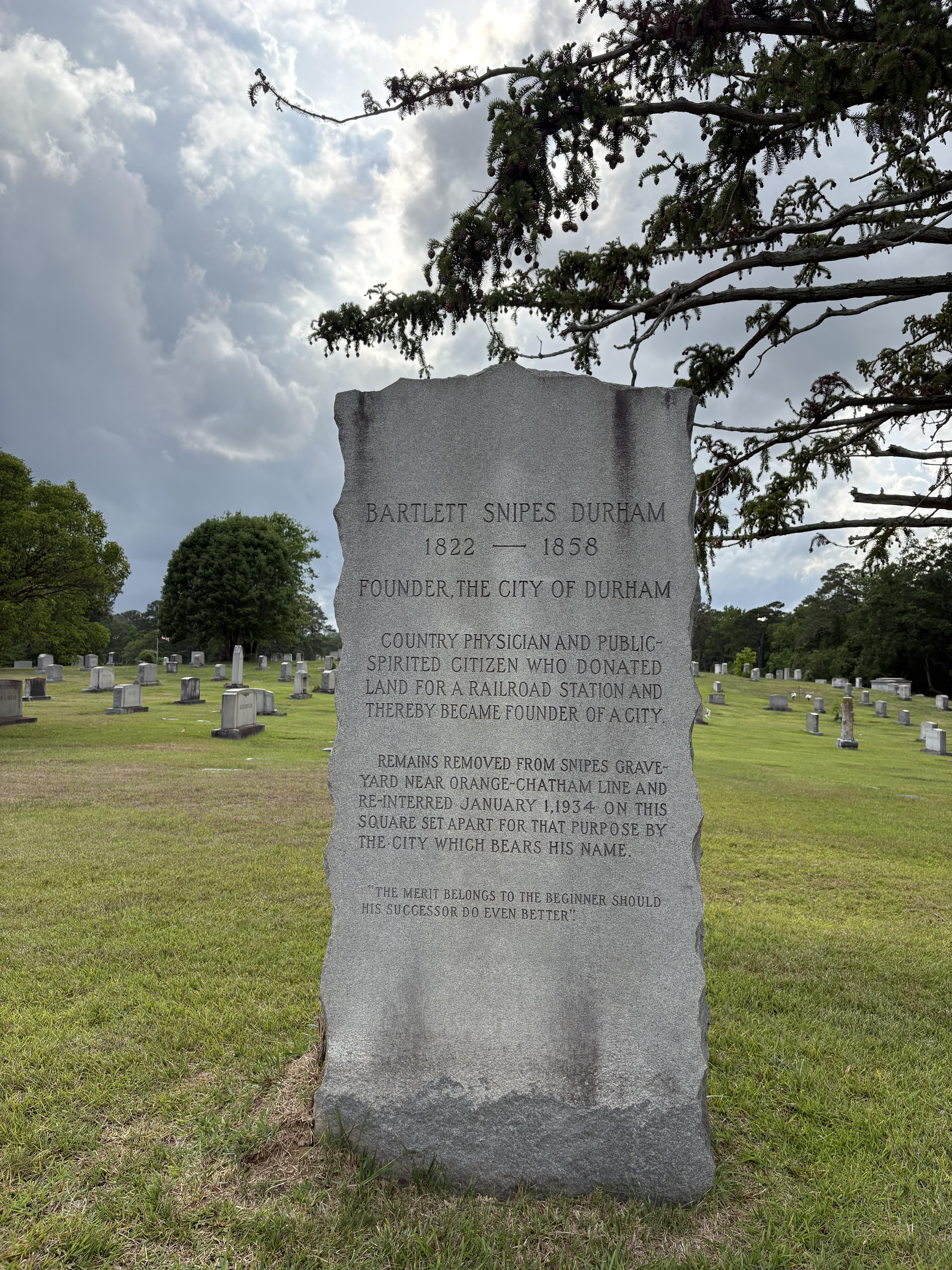
Durham's grave at Maplewood Cemetery.

Durham was laid to rest in a windowed iron coffin in an unmarked grave on the grounds of Antioch Cemetery in Orange County, wearing "gold-rimmed" glasses. Shortly after Durham County was formed, Julian S. Carr began a public campaign advocating the exhumation and reburial of Bartlett Durham's remains within his namesake city. Nearly a decade after Carr himself had died, Durham officials exhumed the coffin on June 27, 1933, with Mayor W.F. Carr and County Commissioner John Harris officially accepting the remains for the city and county. It was transported to Hall-Wynne Funeral Home, where it lay in state for several days. Reburial took place Jan. 2, 1934, in Maplewood Cemetery, under a marker that lists incorrect middle name, and erroneous dates of birth and death.
