= Durham High School (North Carolina) =

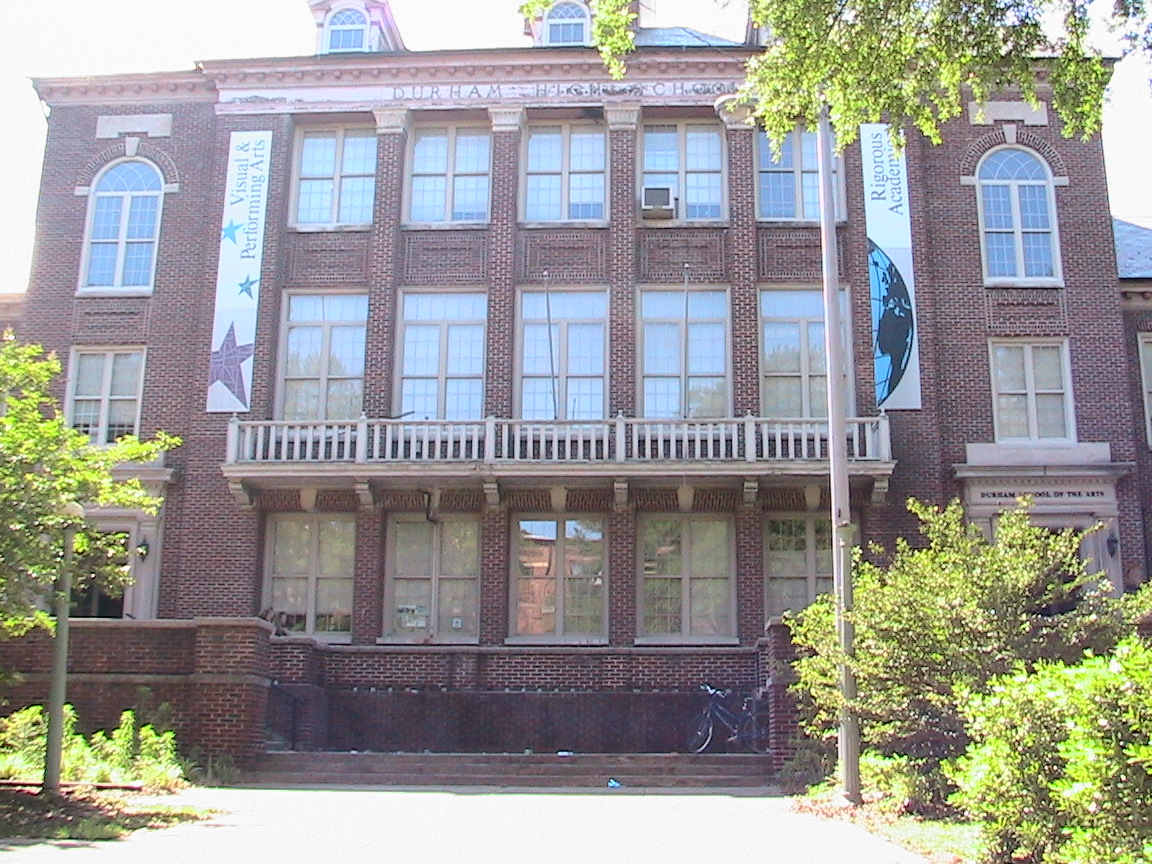
- Durham High School, now the main building at Durham School of the Arts

Location
- Durham, North Carolina; United States; 36°0′12″N 78°54′23″W

Information
- Type: Public
- Opened: 1922
- Closed: 1995
- Campus type: Urban area

Durham High School is a former high school in Durham, North Carolina, United States. Their school colors were Maroon & White and their mascot was the Bulldogs.

== History ==
From 1906 to 1922, Central High School, located on Morris Street, served Durham city's white high school students. Central High School's building would be converted to Durham's City Hall, and is now the home of the Durham Arts Council. In 1922, the newly constructed Durham High School would replace Central High School, on property that once belonged to Brodie L. Duke.

During racial segregation, Durham High School was a high school for whites in the city of Durham. The high school for African Americans was Hillside High School. In 1959, Durham High School began integration under then Superintendent of Schools, Lew W. Hannen. In 1959–60 African Americans Joycelyn McKissick, a senior, and Claudette Brame, a junior, enrolled.

Located next to Durham High School, was Central Junior High School, which opened in 1926. The building was later renamed Julian S. Carr Junior High School in 1945. The junior high became part of the Durham High School campus in the fall of 1975, when the school district expanded high schools to include grade 9. (Prior to that year, Durham junior highs included grades 7–9 and high schools served grades 10–12.)

By the 1980s, Durham High School was no longer a majority white school.

In 1992, the Durham City and County School Districts merged to become Durham Public Schools. Durham High School would close as a traditional high school in 1995.

In 1995, Durham Magnet Center for Visual and Performing Arts opened, and was later renamed Durham School of the Arts. The former Durham High School campus now makes up part of the Durham School of the Arts campus, along with the site of the former Carr Middle School. The former Durham High School auto shop, is now Durham School of the Art's Black Box Theatre.

== Athletics ==
Durham High's football team won five state championships between 1938 and 1945, under Coach Cary Brewbaker. By the 1970s, the Bulldog football program built another powerhouse under Hal Stewart, and later under James "Bump" Elliott, during the late 1970s and early 1980s.

Durham High was also known for its basketball program as well. Durham High led North Carolina in most Boys Basketball State Championships with 13, before New Hanover High School surpassed them. During a three-year period, from 1937 through 1940, under Coach Paul Sykes, Durham High's basketball team compiled a phenomenal record of 73 straight wins. Included in those wins, were championships in the Duke-Durham Invitational Tournament and the Eastern Interscholastic Tournament at Glens Falls, New York. The premier player during this three year undefeated span was Horace "Bones" McKinney. The gymnasium at Durham High was later named for Coach Sykes.

In 1969, Dave Odom became Durham High's basketball coach. He was voted the league's coach of the year five times in his seven years there, later becoming a head coach at Wake Forest University.

== Notable alumni ==
- Kate Lee Harris Adams – aviator and member of the Women Airforce Service Pilots
- George V. Allen – United States diplomat
- Elmer Barbour – NFL blocking back and linebacker
- Claudia Belk – First Lady of Charlotte
- Isaac M. "Ike" Carpenter – jazz bandleader and pianist active in the 1940s and 1950s
- George Watts Carr – architect
- Roger Craig – MLB pitcher, coach and manager
- Nick Galifianakis – served as a U.S. Congressman from North Carolina
- Bob Gantt – professional basketball player
- David Gergen – political commentator and presidential advisor
- Kenneth Gergen – social psychologist and university professor
- George Watts Hill – banker, hospital administrator and philanthropist
- Louis Isaac Jaffe – journalist and Pulitzer Prize for Editorial Writing winner
- John D. Loudermilk – country singer and songwriter
- Loretta Lynch – served as the 83rd attorney general of the United States from 2015 to 2017
- Charles Markham – served as the mayor of Durham from 1981 to 1985
- Bones McKinney – former NBA player and coach
- Thom Mount – former president of Universal Pictures
- Don Schlitz – singer-songwriter and Country Music Hall of Fame inductee
- Ted G. Stone – Southern Baptist evangelist
