= Josiah Charles Trent =

American surgeon and historian

- Born: August 7, 1914; Okmulgee, Oklahoma
- Died: December 10, 1948 (aged 34); Durham, North Carolina
- Education: Duke University (A.B. 1934); University of Pennsylvania (M.D. 1939)
- Occupation: Surgeon
- Years active: 1938–1948
- Spouse: Mary Duke Biddle Trent Semans (m. 1938–1948)
- Children: Mary Trent Jones; Sarah Trent Harris; Rebecca Trent Kirkland; Barbara Trent Kimbrell

Josiah Charles Trent (August 7, 1914 – December 10, 1948) was an American surgeon and historian of medicine. He is noted for his collection of rare books and manuscripts documenting the history of western medicine. After his death, his widow, Mary Duke Biddle Trent Semans, donated his collection of books to Duke University. Today, this collection forms the foundation of the History of Medicine Collections in the David M. Rubenstein Rare Book & Manuscript Library.

== Biography ==
=== Early life ===
Josiah Charles Trent was born in Okmulgee, Oklahoma, on 7 August 1914, the youngest of four children. His father, Josiah Charles Trent, was a merchant from Arkansas who did business with both settlers and Native Americans. His mother, Mary Simpson Trent, was a music teacher born in Mississippi.

=== Education ===
As a child, Trent attended the public schools in Okmulgee, Oklahoma, and graduated from high school with honors at the age of 16. He then attended Duke University, receiving his A.B. degree with honors in 1934 at the age of 19. He then began studying medicine at the University of Pennsylvania, where he received an M.D. with honors in 1938. While there, he developed an interest in surgical pathology and the history of medicine. Following his graduation from the University of Pennsylvania, Trent began a one-year medical internship at the Henry Ford Hospital in Detroit, Michigan.

=== Career ===
In 1939, he began a residency at the Duke University School of Medicine, which lasted six years. At its completion, Trent was offered two positions at Duke: become a junior member of the Department of Surgery in general surgery or develop, as head, a Division of Thoracic Surgery. He chose the latter option, but asked for two years to gain additional experience. During that period, he served as instructor in thoracic surgery at the University of Michigan. There, he worked under John Alexander, who was the university's first head of thoracic surgery. While at the University of Michigan, he gained experience in the operation and administration of thoracic surgical case management. However, he only stayed there a year. At his request, he left his position at Michigan and returned to Duke to begin the Division of Thoracic Surgery.

As part of his professional service, Trent was a member of the North Carolina Medical Journal and the Journal of the History of Medicine and Allied Sciences editorial boards. Between 1944 and 1947, he edited a column called "Thumbnail Sketches of Eminent Physicians" for the North Carolina Medical Journal; many of the articles were also written by Trent. He served the Army Medical Library as an honorary consultant. In 1948, he presented papers on the history of medicine at the American Association of the History of Medicine and the Grolier Club.

He was a member of the American Association of the History of Medicine, Charaka Club, and Grolier Club, which reflected his interest in the history of medicine and in collecting books and manuscripts.

==== Professional Affiliations ====
- Durham-Orange County Medical Society (Secretary-Treasurer, 1947-1948)
- Founders Group of the American Board of Thoracic Surgery
- Duke Hospital Library Committee (Chairman)
- Friends of the Duke University Library (Executive Committee)
- American Medical Association (Medical History Section, Secretary)
- American Board of Surgery
- Society of University of Surgeons
- American College of Surgeons
- National Tuberculosis Association
- National Trudeau Society

Trent discontinued his Southern Medical Association membership because he felt that they were discriminatory against black physicians.

=== Illness and death ===
In 1941, Trent underwent surgery for an abdominal mass which was identified as an abdominal lymphosarcoma. In 1946, he underwent another surgery to relieve intracranial pressure resulting from the lymphosarcoma. However, by November 1948, the disease became widely disseminated, and he died on December 10 in Durham, North Carolina.

== Personal life ==
=== Marriage and children ===
In 1938, at the age of 24, Trent married Mary Duke Biddle Trent Semans. Their marriage has been described as "one of rare happiness". They had four daughters.

=== Philanthropy ===
Trent believed that "current medicine is most successfully practiced and understood by persons who are knowledgeable of its history," as cited in NCpedia. In 1938, while living in Detroit, this belief led Trent and his wife, Mary Semans, to begin collecting items relating to the history of medicine. They also collected materials relating to Walt Whitman, who was a favorite author of Semans'. Trent was active in communities of book collectors and was a member of the Grolier Club in New York from 1939-1948. In 1945, the Trents donated their Whitman materials to Duke University to promote "student interest in and use of original sources." After Trent's death, his widow Mary also donated their collection of materials on the history of medicine to Duke University School of Medicine. As of 2015, the collection is housed in the David M. Rubenstein Rare Book & Manuscript Library.

Josiah Charles Trent also started the first blood bank at Duke University.

Beginning in 1948 until his death, Josiah Charles Trent began serving as a trustee on the board of Lincoln Hospital in Durham, North Carolina. The Duke family was among the founders of the hospital, which served African Americans in Durham County and the surrounding area.

== Legacy ==
After the death of Josiah Charles Trent, his family made several contributions to Duke University in his memory. The Josiah Charles Trent Memorial Foundation was founded in 1977 by his widow Mary Duke Biddle Trent Semans and her second husband James H. Semans, which provides seed grants for Duke University faculty and staff who are researching topics in the history of medicine and related areas. The Foundation also established the Josiah Charles Trent Professorship in the History of Medicine and the Josiah Charles Trent Scholar in Medical Humanities at Duke University. Duke University's Trent Center for Bioethics, Humanities & History of Medicine is also named after Josiah Charles Trent.
