= Mary Duke Biddle =

American philanthropist (1887–1960)

Mary Lillian Duke Biddle
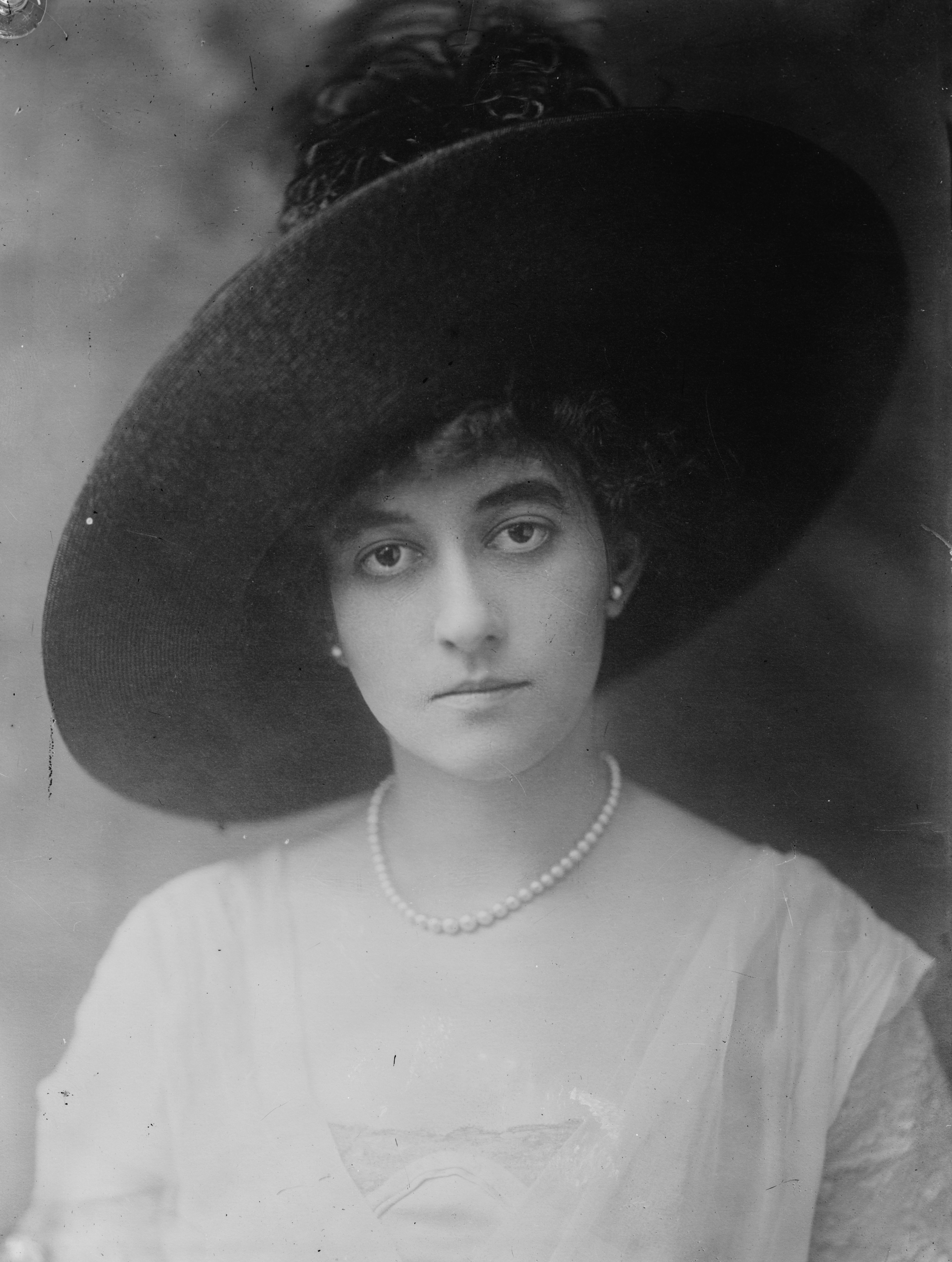
- Born: Mary Lillian Duke; November 16, 1887; Durham, North Carolina, U.S.
- Died: June 14, 1960 (aged 72); Durham, North Carolina, U.S.
- Resting place: Maplewood Cemetery
- Spouse: Anthony Joseph Drexel Biddle, Jr. (m. 1915; div. 1931)
- Children: Mary Duke Biddle Trent Semans; Nicholas Benjamin Duke Biddle
- Parent(s): Benjamin Newton Duke; Sarah Pearson Angier
- Relatives: Angier Buchanan Duke (brother)

Mary Lillian Duke Biddle (November 16, 1887 – June 14, 1960) was an American philanthropist.

== Early life ==
She was born as Mary Lillian Duke on November 16, 1887, to Benjamin Newton Duke in Durham, North Carolina. She attended Durham's Trinity College, the institutional predecessor of Duke University, which was named in honor of her family. She graduated in 1907 with a degree in English.

She was a great enthusiast for the arts and traveled frequently with her family to New York City for the theater and opera, later becoming an accomplished singer and musician. In 1912 she was engaged to Prince Ludovic Pignatelli d'Aragon, an Italian nobleman, who tried to kill himself after the marriage was cancelled.

Around 1918, she was given her father's brick-and-limestone Beaux-Arts townhouse on Fifth Avenue at 82nd Street. It was built in 1901 and is now known as the Benjamin N. Duke House. It is one of only nine surviving mansions on Fifth Avenue.

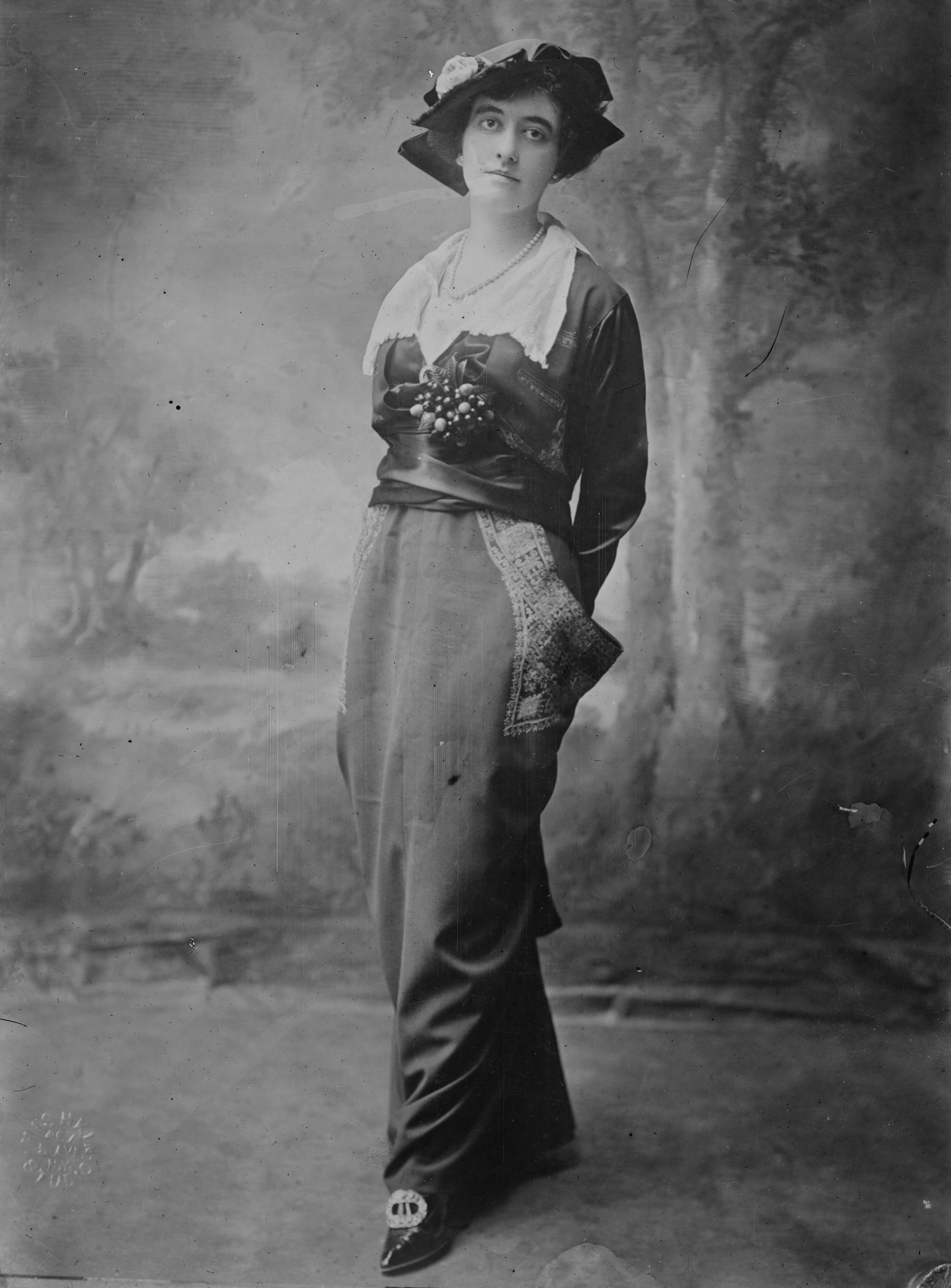
Biddle in 1916

== Marriage and later life ==
Her marriage to Anthony Joseph Drexel Biddle Jr. in 1915 ended in divorce in 1931. Their children were Mary Duke Biddle Trent Semans and Nicholas Benjamin Duke Biddle.

She and her husband owned an estate, "Linden Court", in Tarrytown, New York, bought from the William R. Harris family in 1921. It still stands today as the Tarrytown House Estate and Conference Center.

She established the Mary Duke Biddle Foundation in 1956. Since then, the foundation has donated more than $28 million in grants to non-profit organizations.

The Foundation commissioned American composer Norman Dello Joio to write a piece for the Duke University Band and its conductor Paul Bryan titled Variants on a Medieval Tune based on the melody In dulci jubilo. It was first performed on April 10, 1963.

The Mary Duke Biddle Estate at Durham, North Carolina, was her home from 1935 until her death in 1960. It was listed on the National Register of Historic Places in 2013.
