= Morehead Hill Historic District =

Historic district in North Carolina, United States

- U.S. National Register of Historic Places
- U.S. Historic district
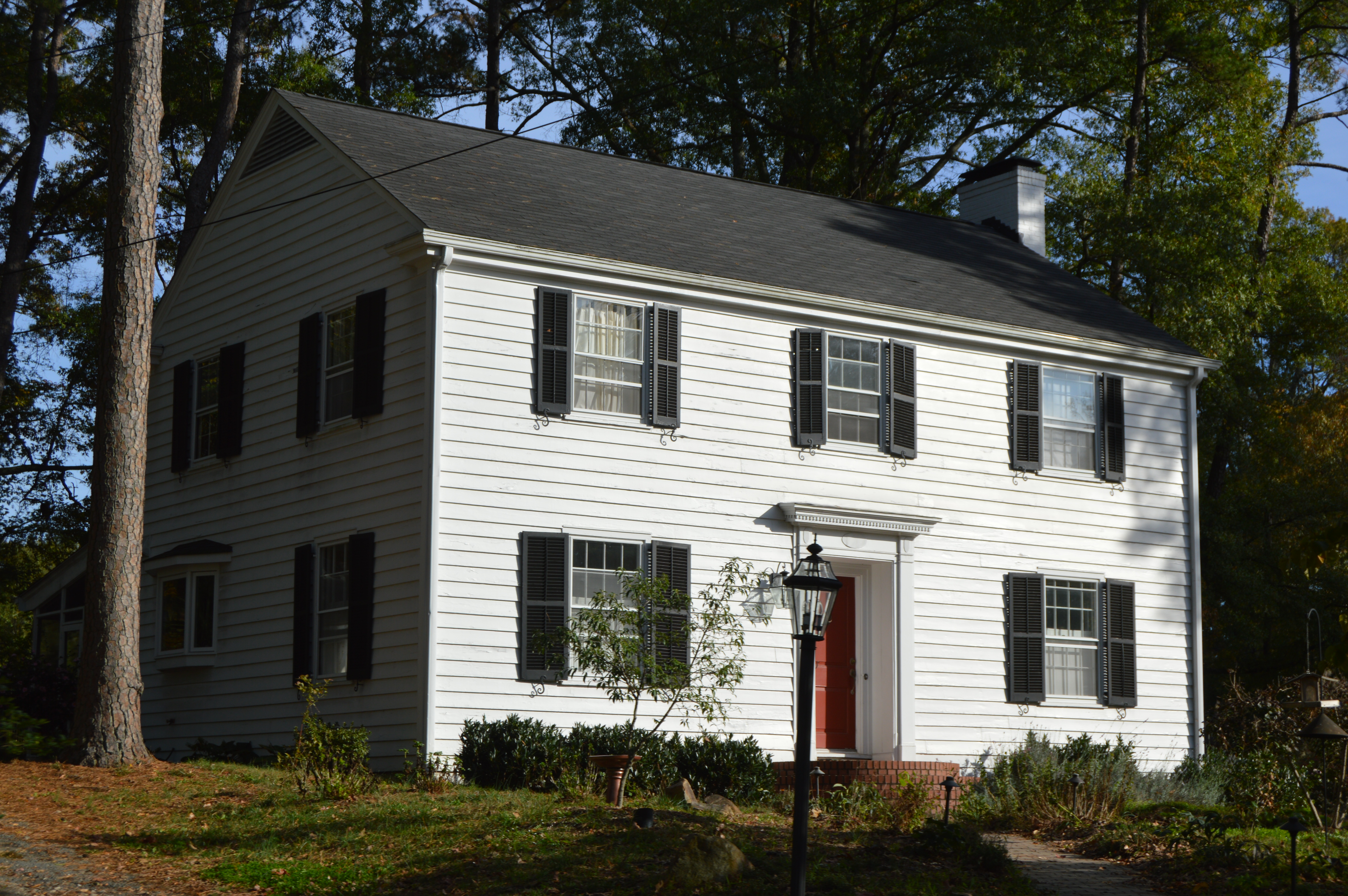
- Typical district residence, the William B. Rowland, Jr., House on Vickers Avenue

- Location within North Carolina Location within the United States
- Location: Roughly bounded by Jackson St., East-West Expressway, S. Duke St., Lakewood Ave., Shephard St. and Arnette Ave.; also portions of Arnette, Vickers, Yancey, Parker, and Wells Sts., Durham, North Carolina
- Coordinates: 35°59′23″N 78°54′46″W
- Area: 95.4 acres (38.6 ha)
- Architect: Multiple
- Architectural style: Late 19th And 20th Century Revivals, Bungalow/craftsman, Late Victorian
- MPS: Durham MRA
- NRHP reference No.: 85001792, 04000567 (Boundary Increase)
- Added to NRHP: August 9, 1985, June 2, 2004 (Boundary Increase)

Morehead Hill Historic District is a national historic district located at Durham, Durham County, North Carolina. The district encompasses 206 contributing buildings in a predominantly residential section of Durham. They were built between the late-19th century and 1950s and include notable examples of Late Victorian, Queen Anne, and Bungalow / American Craftsman style architecture.

It was listed on the National Register of Historic Places in 1985, with a boundary increase in 2004.

== Notable buildings ==
- Harwood Hall
- John Sprunt Hill House
- Greystone Manor

== Notable residents ==
- George Watts Hill, banker and philanthropist
- John Sprunt Hill, lawyer and banker
- Jillian Johnson, politician
- Jessamyn Stanley, yoga teacher and body positivity advocate
- George Washington Watts, financier and philanthropist
- Sara Virginia Ecker Watts Morrison, First Lady of North Carolina
