= Downtown Durham Historic District =

Historic district in North Carolina, United States

- U.S. National Register of Historic Places
- U.S. Historic district
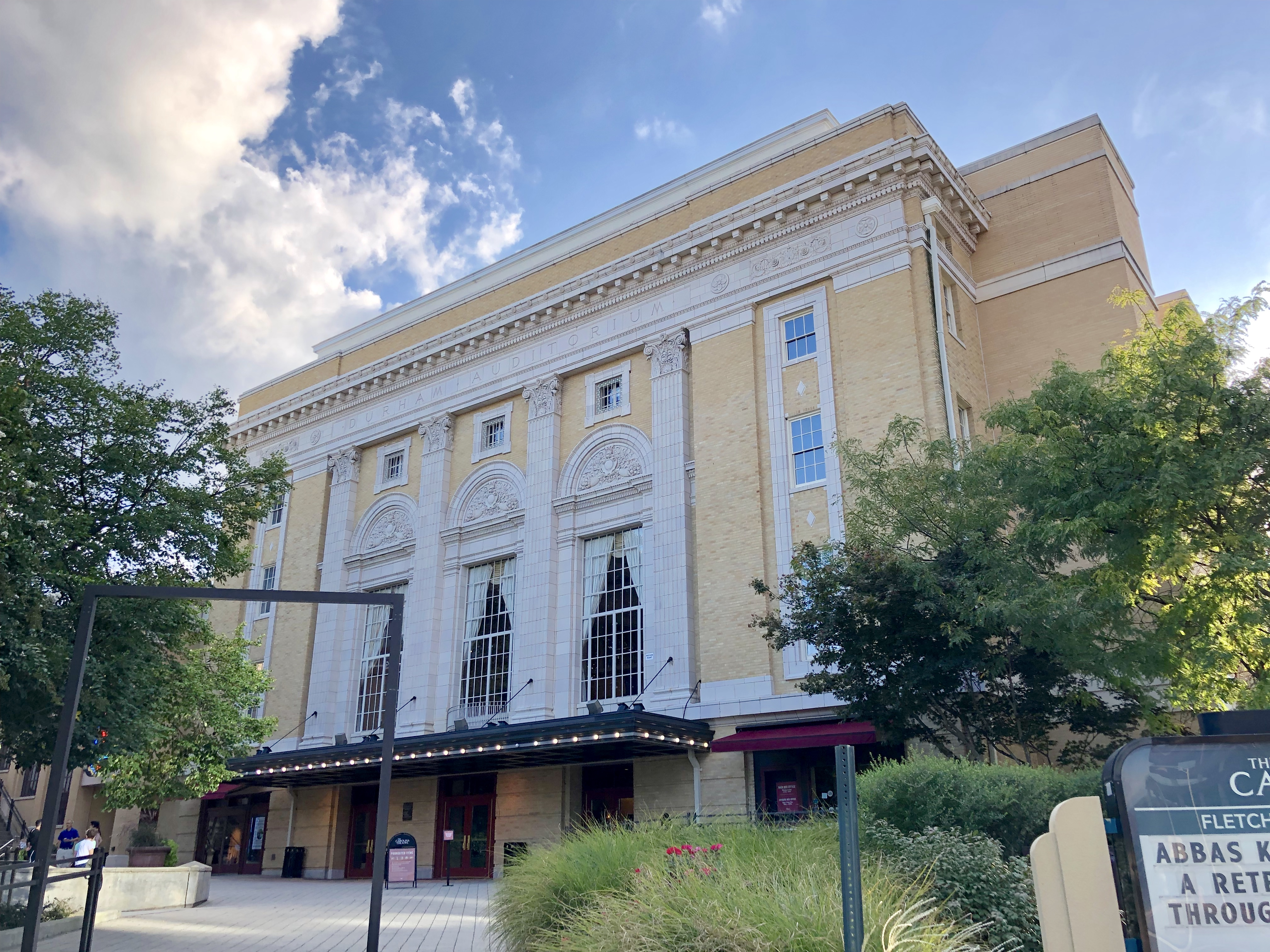
- Carolina Theatre, Downtown Durham Historic District, September 2019

- Location within North Carolina Location within the United States
- Location: Roughly bounded by Peabody, Morgan, Seminary, Cleveland, Parrish, and Queen Sts., Durham, North Carolina
- Coordinates: 35°59′42″N 78°54′01″W
- Area: 0 acres (0 ha)
- Architect: Multiple
- Architectural style: Late 19th And 20th Century Revivals, Art Deco
- NRHP reference No.: 77000998
- Added to NRHP: November 1, 1977

Downtown Durham Historic District is a national historic district located at Durham, Durham County, North Carolina. The district encompasses 97 contributing buildings and 1 contributing structure in the central business district of Durham. It was listed on the National Register of Historic Places in 1977. It is east of the Bright Leaf Historic District and west of the Holloway Street Historic District.

The buildings primarily date from the first four decades of the 20th century and include examples of Colonial Revival, Italianate, and Art Deco architecture.

The historic district contains the majority of Black Wall Street, a relatively prosperous majority black-owned business hub in the early decades of 1900s centered on Parrish Street.

Notable buildings include 111 West Main Street (1893), 117 West Main Street (1890s), 308 West Main Street (1906), St. Philip's Episcopal Church (1907), Durham Arts Council Building (1906), First Presbyterian Church (1916), Trinity United Methodist Church (1880-1881), First Baptist Church (1926-1927), Durham County Courthouse (1916), Carolina Theatre of Durham (1920s), Tempest Building (1894, 1905), National Guard Armory (1934-1937), United States Post Office (1934), Trust Building (1904), First National Bank Building (1913-1915), Mechanics and Farmers Bank (1921), Johnson Motor Company showroom (1927), Hill Building (1935), Snow Building (1933), and S. H. Kress Building (1932).

== 2017 Confederate Monument Removal ==
On August 14, 2017 a 15-foot-high statue of an armed Confederate patriot was torn down in front of the 1916 Durham County Courthouse by demonstrators. The destruction of the statue followed the 2017 Unite the Right rally in Charlottesville, Virginia where one counter-demonstrator was killed.
