= First Presbyterian Church (Durham, North Carolina) =

Presbyterian church in Durham, NC

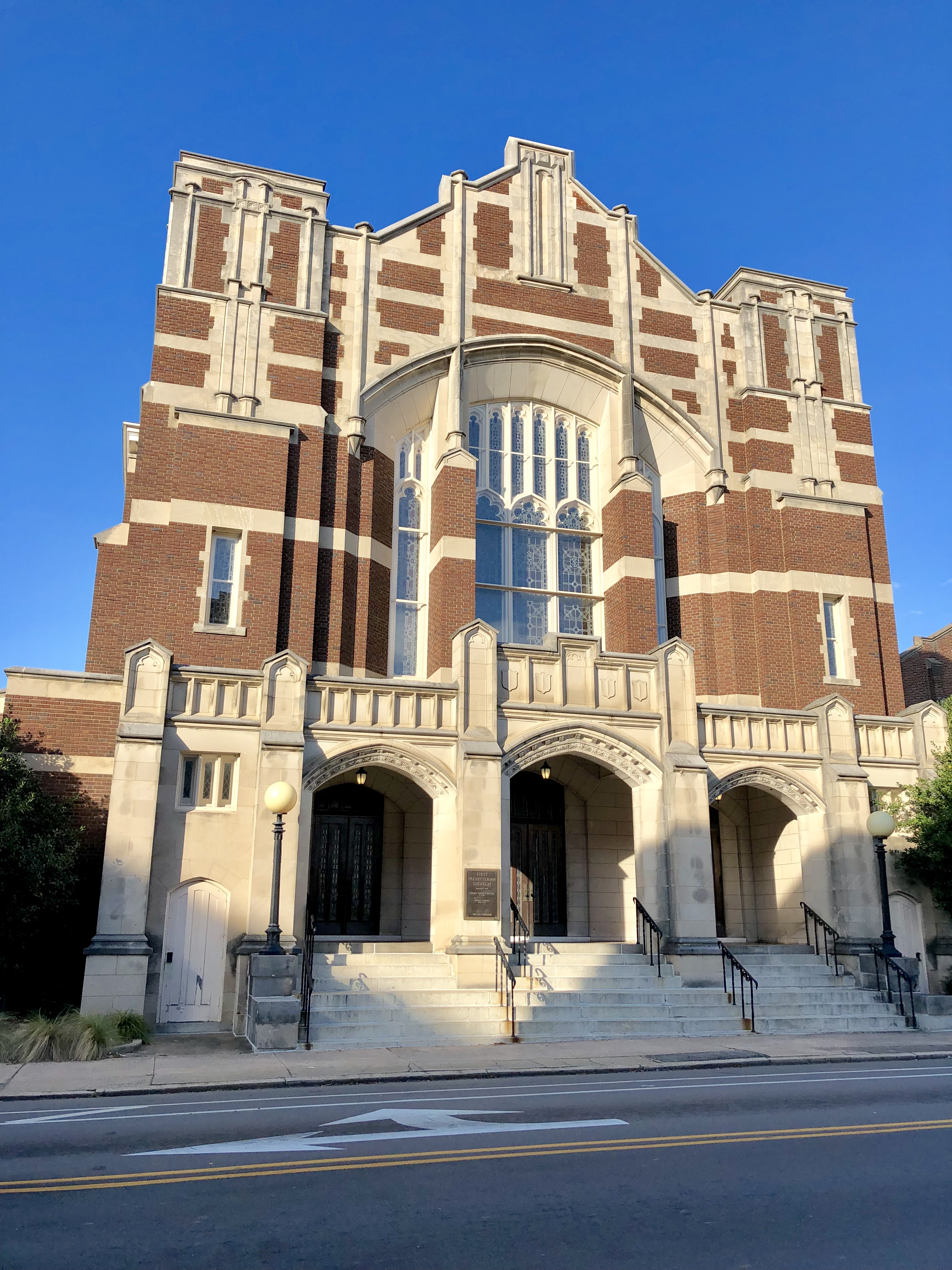
- First Presbyterian Church in 2019

Religion
- Affiliation: PCUSA
- Status: Active

Location
- Location: 305 E Main Street; Durham, North Carolina, United States
- Interactive map of First Presbyterian Church
- Coordinates: 35°59′38″N 78°53′52″W

Architecture
- Architects: Milburn and Heister
- Type: Gothic Revival
- Completed: 1916

Website
- firstpres-durham.org

First Presbyterian Church is a historic Presbyterian church in Durham, North Carolina. Located in the Downtown Durham Historic District, it is the oldest Presbyterian congregation in the city.

== History ==
In 1860, Dr. Richard Blacknall moved from Rougemont to Durham and convinced Rev. James Phillips and Rev. Charles Phillips of Chapel Hill to hold Presbyterian sermons in Trinity Methodist Church and First Baptist Church. In 1871, the congregation formally organized during a meeting of the Orange Presbytery. In 1875, they purchased a plot of land on the corner of Roxboro Road and Main Street and constructed a small frame church building.

The industrialist George Washington Watts was a member of the church and funded missionary trips to Cuba, Brazil, Korea, and Africa. In 1890, helped fund a new brick Gothic Revival church building with a seventy-foot tower.

In 1916, the church hired the architects Milburn and Heister, who built the Carolina Theatre, to design a new Gothic Revival building. In 1922, a parsonage was added to the east of the church.

The church partnered with Trinity Methodist, First Baptist, and St. Philip's Episcopal to create Congregations in Action, an organization that provided assistance to residents of Oldham Towers and the Liberty Street Apartments.
