= Durham Academy (North Carolina) =

Private school in Durham, North Carolina, US

- Signage on the Preschool/Lower School campus of Durham Academy.

Location
- 3501 Ridge Road (Preschool / Lower School campus) 3116 Academy Road (Middle School campus) 3601 Ridge Road (Upper School campus); Durham, North Carolina 27705; United States; 35°58′37″N 78°58′12″W

Information
- Type: Private
- Founded: 1933 (93 years ago)
- CEEB code: 341049
- Head of school: Michael Ulku-Steiner
- Staff: 305
- Grades: Pre-K–12
- Gender: All-gender
- Enrollment: 1,272
- Campus: 84 acres (34 ha)
- Campus type: Suburban
- Colors: Green and white
- Athletics: North Carolina Independent Schools Athletic Association (NCISAA)
- Mascot: Cavalier
- Accreditation: SACS
- Tuition: $37,5000 (grades 9–12) $35,100 (grades 5–8) $33,500 (grades 1–4) $28,700 (Pre-K & Kindergarten)
- Affiliations: NAIS, NCAIS
- Website: da.org

Durham Academy is an independent, coeducational, day school in Durham, North Carolina, in the United States, whose 1,272 students range from pre-kindergarten to grade 12.

The school has four divisions, each with its own director: Preschool (Pre-kindergarten/Kindergarten), Lower School (grades 1–4), Middle School (grades 5–8) and Upper School (grades 9–12). These are arrayed on three campuses that comprise 84 acres; the Preschool, Lower School and Upper School are situated on Ridge Road, and the Middle School is on Academy Road.

Durham Academy's statistics claim 50% of students identify as people of color.

In 2026–2027, Durham Academy awarded $5.5 million in financial aid; the average award was $22,537. About 19% students receive some level of financial aid.

== History ==
Durham Academy was founded in 1933 as the Calvert Method School by George Watts Hill and his wife Ann McCullough Hill. The couple established the school as a private, independent school to educate their children. The school's teaching philosophy (and its name) was based on the Calvert School in Baltimore, which Mrs. Hill attended as a child. The Calvert Method School's first home was in the original home of Hill's grandfather, George Washington Watts, who had moved into the larger Harwood Hall. The school was later run in Durham's Forest Hills neighborhood, with the neighborhood's clubhouse serving as a classroom for seven students and one teacher.

In August 2002, Durham Academy's Preschool and Lower School moved to 17.01 acres on the Ridge Road campus. The building that was just opened has been recognized by the Chicago Athenaeum: Museum of Architecture and Design for its style.

Durham Academy received widespread press on February 12, 2014, after school administrators used rap music in a video announcing that the school would be closed due to snow.

In 2015, Durham Academy's auditioned a cappella group, XIV Hours, released a video entitled "Lost in the Game" that discussed the sexual nature of many popular song lyrics. The video quickly became popular and was covered in several major news sites, including MTV and the Huffington Post. The music video was also nominated for Best High School Video in the 2016 CASA A Capella Video awards.

Durham Academy Upper School STEM & Humanities Center

== Academics ==
Students at Durham Academy have won multiple national titles in chess, debate, and mathematical modeling Over the past five years, Durham Academy has produced 58 National Merit Scholarship finalists (2025).

76% of Durham Academy faculty members hold advanced degrees, and they average 18 years of teaching experience. Faculty have won Outstanding Educator Awards from the University of Chicago (Mike Spatola, 2012; Jeff Biersach, 2024) and have been recognized by the Stanford Teacher Tribute Initiative (Mike Spatola, 2011).

== Rankings ==
Niche ranks Durham Academy as the #1 K-12 school in North Carolina with an overall rating of "A+". The school maintains a 100% graduation rate, and 99% of graduates go on to attend a 4-year college.

== Athletics ==
Durham academy's athletic offerings include field hockey, volleyball, cross-country, tennis, soccer, swimming, basketball, lacrosse, softball, track and field, baseball, and golf. Durham Academy had the first high school boys lacrosse program in Durham County.

In the 2025–2026 school year, Durham Academy won four team state championships (NCISAA Division 1): girls cross country, boys lacrosse, boys tennis and girls track & field.

Durham Academy Preschool/Lower School campus

The girls cross country team won the 2018 NCISAA state championship and have since then been champs in the TISAC conference championships numerous times. The boys cross country team won the TISAC conference championship title in 2018 and placed second at the NCISAA state championship in 2018, 2021, and 2024. The varsity girls field hockey team won the 2012 North Carolina Independent Schools Athletic Association championship. The cross country and track programs at Durham Academy are particularly notable, with 39 team state championships and 196 individual titles during the tenure of former head coach Dennis Cullen.

Several Durham Academy athletes have gone on to Division I programs, including Duke University, Universidad de Morón, University of Vermont, U.S. Naval Academy, Wake Forest University, Harvard University, Brown University, and the University of North Carolina. Among those athletes are Mollie Pathman, the 2009-2010 Gatorade National Girls Soccer Player, who played on the U.S. women's Under-20 national team at the 2012 World Cup, Evan Fjeld, a McDonald's All-American nominee who graduated from the University of Vermont and has played professionally in the NBA G-League as well as in Malta and Switzerland, and Lauren Blazing, Duke's field hockey goalkeeper, who was one of three nominees for 2016 NCAA Woman of the Year, played with the USWNT in the 2016 Rio Olympics, was a three-time All-American, a two-time Capital One first team Academic All-American athlete and won ACC Field Hockey Scholar-Athlete of the Year twice.

== Arts ==
"In the Pocket", an audition-based musical group, has performed at venues around the city and the country. There are also several extracurricular a cappella singing groups.

XIV Hours has been included four times on Best of High School A Capella annual compilations, with their most recent inclusion on the 2017 compilation.

== Speech & Debate ==
Durham Academy's debate team is one of the most competitive teams in the nation. In recent years, they have won the National Speech and Debate Association National Championship (2024), the Tournament of Champions (2023), the National Catholic Forensic League Grand National Tournament (2022), the Glenbrooks Tournament, the Yale Invitational, the Harvard tournament, Florida Blue Key, and the Sunvitational. In addition, the team has won multiple district and NC state championships (most recently in 2021, 2022, 2023, and 2026).

== Notable alumni ==
- Lauren Blazing – field hockey player for the U.S. women's national team
- Hope Boykin – dancer and choreographer
- Brendan Bradley – actor, producer, writer, and director
- Ray Chadwick – Major League Baseball pitcher
- Anthony Roth Costanzo – countertenor, actor, and producer who has led performances at opera companies around the world
- Matt Crawford – former Major League Soccer player
- Tate Fogleman – professional stock car racing driver
- Ward Horton – actor
- John Pardon – Fields medal (2026) winning mathematician who works on geometry and topology
- Mollie Pathman – professional women's soccer player
- Sarah Treem – TV writer-producer and playwright

== See also ==
- List of high schools in North Carolina
