= Harwood Hall =

Demolished mansion in Durham, North Carolina

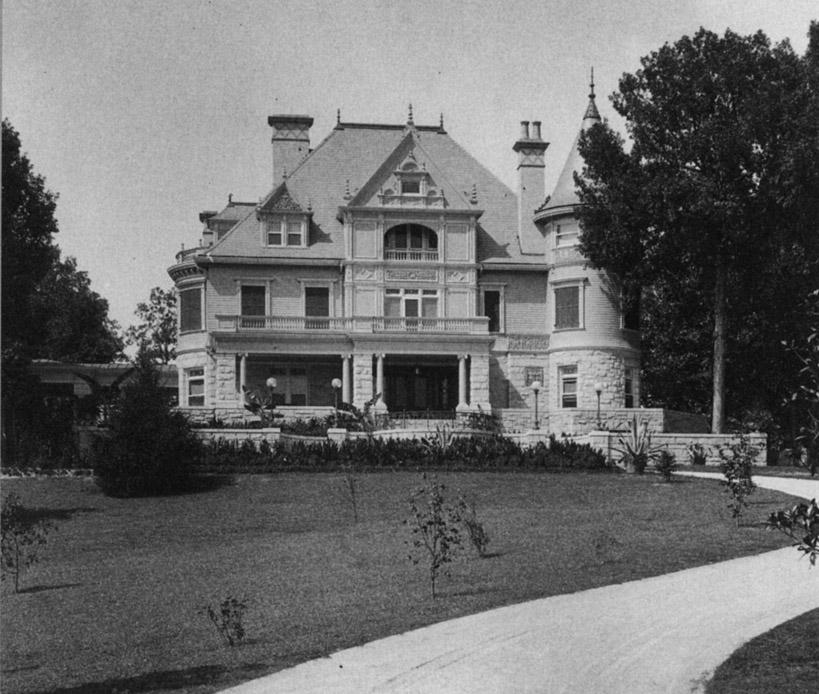
- Interactive map of the Harwood Hall area
- Alternative names: George Watts House

General information
- Status: Demolished
- Type: Private residence arts institution
- Architectural style: Châteauesque
- Location: Durham, North Carolina, U.S.
- Coordinates: 35.9907°N 78.9105°W
- Completed: 1897
- Demolished: 1961
- Owner: George Washington Watts; Sara Virginia Ecker Watts; John Sprunt Hill; George Watts Hill

Design and construction
- Architects: Kendall and Taylor

Harwood Hall, also known as the George Watts House, was a mansion in the Morehead Hill Neighborhood of Durham, North Carolina. It was built for American manufacturer and philanthropist George Washington Watts in 1897. Following his death, Watts' second wife and widow, Sara Virginia Ecker Watts, stayed in the house until her remarriage to North Carolina Governor Cameron A. Morrison. The wedding ceremony of Sara Watts and Governor Morrison took place at Harwood Hall. After his widow's remarriage, the house passed down to Watts' daughter, Annie Louise Watts, and her husband, John Sprunt Hill. The house was later inherited by their son, the banker and philanthropist George Watts Hill. The mansion was demolished in 1961 to make way for what would become Duke University School of Medicine's Physician Assistant Program building.

== History ==
In 1879, Baltimore businessman George Washington Watts decided to build a residence on the ridge of a small valley by West Chapel Hill Street in what is now the Morehead Hill neighborhood in Durham, North Carolina. Watts purchased land from William Vickers and built a large Queen Anne style house between what would become Morehead Avenue, South Duke Street, and Proctor Street. The house was completed in 1880. Once construction on the house was complete, Watts' wife and daughter, Laura Valinda Beale and Annie Louise Watts, joined him in Durham.

Between 1895 and 1896, Watts had his house moved across South Duke Street to make way for a new, more elaborate mansion. His old house became the site of the Calvert School (the precursor to Durham Academy). He hired the contractor C.H. Norton and a Boston-based architectural firm, Kendall and Taylor, to construct a three-story pink granite Châteauesque mansion, which he named Harwood Hall. The same architectural firm was used to build Watts Hospital and the future home of Watts' daughter, the John Sprunt Hill House. Watts and his wife lived at Harwood Hall throughout the early decades of the twentieth century. His first wife died in 1915, and he later married a second time to Sara Virginia Ecker, who had been his family's nurse. In 1921, Watts became ill and died. Thousands of people attended the funeral service at Harwood Hall. His widow continued to live at the house until she remarried to North Carolina Governor Cameron A. Morrison in 1924. The estate then passed to Watts' daughter, Annie, and her husband, John Sprunt Hill. They gifted the mansion to their son, George Watts Hill, who moved in with his wife, Ann McCulloch, after an 18-month honeymoon.

Ann McCulloch Hill, an artist who was the daughter of schoolteachers, considered Harwood Hall ostentatious, calling it "a fifty room monstrosity - the satisfied desire of dead ancestors." Despite her disdain for the mansion, she and George lived at Harwood Hall from 1926 until 1938, when they moved to their dairy farm, Quail Roost. The house then served as a temporary home for nurses at Watts Hospital. After returning from fighting in World War II, Hill tried to find an alternative purpose for Harwood Hall, contacting with a hotel management company in 1949 to try and convert the home into a stylish hotel. The hotel deal fell through, resulting in Hill turning the home over to the Allied Arts of Durham in 1954. Allied Arts, a precursor to the Durham Arts Council, was made up of The Art Guild, Civic Choral Society, Duke University Arts Council, Chamber Arts Society, and the Durham chapter of the North Carolina Symphony Society. They occupied Harwood Hall until 1960, when they moved to the nearby Foushee House.

In January 1961, Harwood Hall was demolished to make way for the Hospital Care Association Building, which would later become the Duke University School of Medicine's Physician Assistant Program building. An artist named Gerard Tempest purchased materials from the house for $5,000 in order to build an arts space on Franklin Street in Chapel Hill.
