= St. Philip's Episcopal Church (Durham, North Carolina) =

Episcopal church in Durham, NC

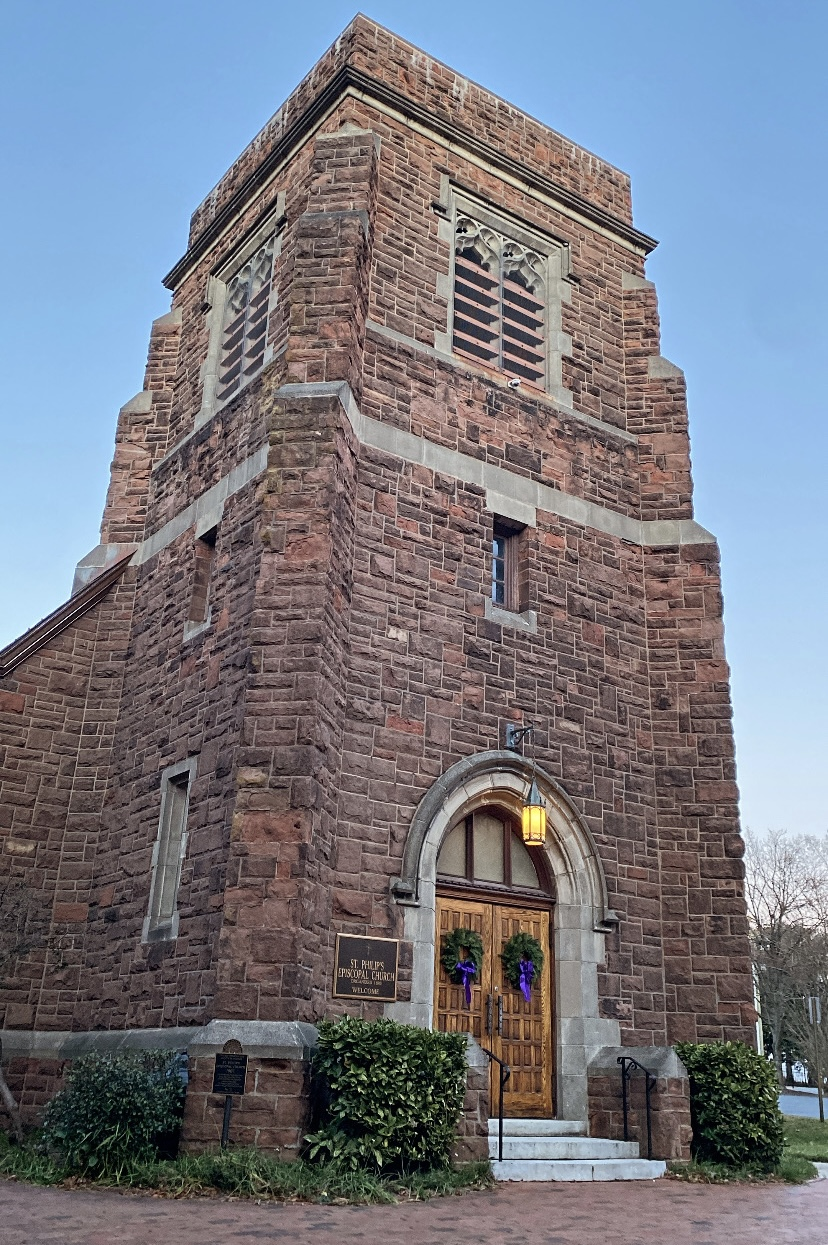
- St. Philip's Church in 2024

Religion
- Affiliation: Episcopal
- District: Episcopal Diocese of North Carolina
- Leadership: Rev. Maryann D. Younger
- Status: Active

Location
- Location: 403 East Main Street; Durham, North Carolina, United States
- Interactive map of St. Philip's Episcopal Church
- Coordinates: 35°59′34″N 78°53′47″W

Architecture
- Architect: Ralph Adams Cram
- Type: Gothic Revival
- Completed: 1908

Website
- stphilipsdurham.org

St. Philip's Episcopal Church is a historic Episcopal church in Durham, North Carolina. It is the oldest remaining church building in the Downtown Durham Historic District and is listed on the register of the Historic Preservation Society of Durham.

== History ==
An Episcopal mission as organized in Durham, North Carolina in 1878 under the leadership of Rev. Joseph Blount Cheshire Jr., rector of Chapel of the Cross in Chapel Hill. The congregation, originally made up of thirteen people, met with Cheshire monthly until it was formally established in 1880 as St. Philip's Church, named for Philip the Deacon. Cheshire purchased a lot on East Main Street in downtown Durham and had a wood-frame building constructed in 1880. In 1906, the frame church was moved to the side of the lot to allow construction of a new stone church. The new Gothic Revival church building was designed by Ralph Adams Cram, who also designed the Cathedral of St. John the Divine in New York City. St. Philip's is the oldest remaining church building in downtown Durham. The original frame church building was demolished in 1934.

The congregation was racially integrated from the time of its founding. St. Philip's, along with Trinity Methodist Church, First Presbyterian Church, and First Baptist Church, was one of the churches of the "property owners", a group of churches to whom the wealthiest Durham residents belonged.

In 1945, George Watts Carr designed a new parish house for the church, constructed on the west side of the property just north of the Copley/Johnson gas station that was also owned by the church. In 1978, Rev. Pauli Murray preached at St. Philip's.

The church rents out it's buildings for banquets, business meetings, weddings, and private events. It is still an active congregation.
