= List of Tournament of Champions winners =

Tournament of Champions is a national high school debate tournament held at the University of Kentucky every year in late April. To qualify, debaters need at least two bids or automatically qualify by placing high enough at last year's Tournament of Champions.

== Policy Debate Champions and Runners Up ==
- 1972: Marquette University High School – Jeff Clark & Mark Foley; Marquette University High School – Mark Miner & David Dries
- 1973: Hillsboro – Mary Thomson & Kather Zickert; Upper Arlington – Peter Koeniz & Doug Dougherty
- 1974: Walter Panas – Denise Gilbert & Larry Falkin; Wilkinsburg – John Tumazos & David Snowball
- 1975: Cardinal Spellman – Leo Gagion & John Bredehoft; Lakeland – Amy Davidoff & Virginia Raymond
- 1976: Cardinal Spellman – Leo Gagion & John Bredehoft; Soquel – Ron Aitken & Jeff Lorenzen
- 1977: Lake Forest (IL) – Karen Albrecht & Hugh Abrams; Robinson – Michael Laurence & Shelly Coleman
- 1978: Walter Panas – Donna Gilbert & Patrick O'Neill; Bronx High School of Science (NY) – Eric Raps & Matthew Mandell
- 1979: Bronx High School of Science (NY) – Andrew Berman & Herschel Goldfield; Marquette University High School – Jim Boehner & John Barrett
- 1980: Glenbrook North (IL) – Jeff Wagner & Brad Malis; Bronx High School of Science (NY) – Stuart Weich & Andrew Berman
- 1981: Glenbrook South (IL) – Jeffrey Wortman & Mark Koulogeorge; Firestone – Alan Gerber & Steve Dist
- 1982: Oak Park & River Forest (IL) – Todd Martin & Eric Brackett; Glenbrook North (IL) – Peter Braverman & Ken Karas
- 1983: Oak Park & River Forest (IL) – Macklin Trimnell & C.V. Doherty; Creighton Prep – Wally Mullin & Don Erftmier, Jr.
- 1984: Lake Braddock – Shaun Martin & Mike Green; New Trier (IL) – Laura Michaelis & Moria McDermott
- 1985: Lake Braddock – Joe Pettit & Mike Green; Marquette University High School – Ed Lynch & Kevin Roe
- 1986: Albany – Peter Gross & Andrew Schrank; Bishop Guertin (NH) – Pete Klamka & Tim Pramas
- 1987: Manchester – Sarah Gannett & Zach Leber; Stuyvesant (NY) – Hanna Rosin & David Coleman
- 1988: Downers Grove South (IL) – Karrie Schwartz & Bill Fick; Albuquerque Academy (NM) -- Kevin Kuswa & Chris Harris
- 1989: St. Mark's School of Texas (TX) – Steven Sklaver & Jack Stroube; Richmond Kennedy – Colin Kahl & Todd Cort
- 1990: Oak Park & River Forest (IL) – Eric Truett & Brian Ruder; Harvard School – Ara Lovitt & Ahilan Arulanantham
- 1991: Omaha Westside (NE) – Paul Skiermont & Jason Patil; Georgetown Day School (DC) – Daniel Nexon & Rebecca Tushnet
- 1992: Edgemont (NY) – Jason Feldman & Derek Schaffer; Albuquerque Academy (NM) – Jeremy Pena & Mark Kutny
- 1993: Isidore Newman School (LA) – Ben Norwood & Taavi Reiss; Brookfield Central (WI) – David Frank & Joshua Heling
- 1994: Lexington (MA) – Li-Cheng Wang & Steve Lehotsky; Edgemont (NY) – Sanket J. Bulsara & Chris Lennon
- 1995: Niles West (IL) – Armands Revelins & George Kouros; Lexington (MA) – Steve Lehotsky & Matt Nichols
- 1996: Glenbrook North (IL) – Larry Heftman & Adam Hurder; Katy-Taylor (TX)- Jeff McNabb & Kim Sikora
- 1997: Caddo Magnet (LA) – Andy Ryan & Kamal Ghali; Greenhill (TX) – Josh Goldberg & Rashad Hussain
- 1998: Glenbrook South (IL) – Adam Goldstein & Todd Fine; Greenhill (TX) – Caitlin Talmadge & Andrew Bradt
- 1999: Montgomery Bell Academy (TN) – Raja Gaddipati/Robbie Quinn; Lexington (MA) – Josh Lynn & Yoni Cohen
- 2000: Greenhill School (TX) – Asher Haig/Jordan Pietzsch; Centerville (OH) – Caleb Liang & Henry Liu
- 2001: Glenbrook North (IL) – Michael Klinger/Stacey Nathan; Woodward Academy (GA) – Avery Dale and Peter Miller
- 2002: Pace Academy (GA) – Bob Allen/Brian Smith; St. Mark's School of Texas (TX) Josh Branson/Michael Martin
- 2003: The College Preparatory School (CA) – Michael Burshteyn/Eli Anders; Greenhill School (TX) – Maggie Ahn & Saad Hussain
- 2004: Glenbrook North (IL) – Jake Ziering/Michael Rosecrans; College Preparatory School (CA) – Michael Burshteyn/Eli Anders
- 2005: The Westminster Schools (GA) – Anusha Deshpande/Stephen Weil; Chattahoochee (GA) – Garrett Abelkop/John Warden
- 2006: Greenhill School (TX) – Mathew Andrews/Stephen Polley; Glenbrook South (IL) – Abe Corrigan/Mima Lazarevic
- 2007: Glenbrook North (IL) – Matt Fisher/Stephanie Spies; The Westminster Schools (GA) – Stephen Weil/Sanjena Anshu Sathian
- 2008: Greenhill School (TX) – Nicholas Rogan and Olivia Rogan; Colleyville Heritage(TX) – James Hamraie and Evan Defillipis
- 2009: The Westminster Schools (GA) – Sanjena Anshu Sathian/Rajesh Jegadeesh; Bellarmine College Prep (CA) – Will Rafey/Sagar Vijay
- 2010: The Westminster Schools (GA) – Ellis Allen/Daniel Taylor; St. Mark's School of Texas (TX) – Alex Miles/Rishee Batra
- 2011: The Westminster Schools (GA) – Ellis Allen/Daniel Taylor; Lexington (MA) – Arjun Vellayappan/Tyler Engler
- 2012: Iowa City West High School (IA) – Jeffrey Ding/Liam Hancock; Glenbrook North (IL) – Rachel Boroditsky/Nathaniel Sawyer
- 2013: C. K. McClatchy High School (CA) – John Spurlock/Keenan Harris; Glenbrook North (IL) – Natalie Knez/Nathaniel Sawyer
- 2014: Centennial High School (MD) – Gabriel Koo/Michael Koo; Polytechnic High School (CA) – Julia Alison/Les Asimow
- 2015: The Westminster Schools (GA) – Saul Forman/Naman Gupta; Baltimore City College (MD) – Peymaan Motevalli/Joseph Gaylin
- 2016: Highland Park (MN) – Dan Bannister/Ian Dill; Little Rock Central (AR) – Payton Woods/Darrin “DJ” Williams Jr.
- 2017: McDonogh (MD) – Ryan James/Nishad Neelakandan; Peninsula (CA) – Raam Tambe/Jerry Wang
- 2018: Monta Vista (CA) – Rafael Pierry/Dhruv Sudesh; Blue Valley Southwest (KS) – Danish Khan/Stephen Lowe
- 2019: North Broward Prep (FL) – Nicholas Mancini/Giorgio Rabbini; Montgomery Bell Academy (TN) – Aden Barton/Julian Habermann
- 2020: Montgomery Bell Academy (TN) – Aden Barton/Sam Meacham; Whitney M. Young Magnet High School (IL) – Jeremy Margolin/Henry Mitchell
- 2021: Bellarmine College Preparatory (CA) – Adarsh Hiremath/Surya Midha; Chaminade College Preparatory (CA) - Dhruv Ahuja/Azi Hormozdiari
- 2022: Lawrence Free State (KS) – John Marshall/Serena Rupp; Berkeley Preparatory (FL) – Kyle Shah/Antonio Souchet
- 2023: Liberal Arts and Science Academy (TX) – Sam Church/Alexandrea Huang; Montgomery Bell Academy (TN) – Chanden Climaco/Raleigh Maxwell
- 2024: Westwood High School (TX) – Ishan Sharma/Ayush Tripathi; Montgomery Bell Academy (TN) – Cy Turner/Raleigh Maxwell
- 2025: Greenhill School (TX) - Rory Liu/Gautam Chamarthy; Northview High School (GA) - Jerry Chen/Kento Taylor
- 2026: Montgomery Bell Academy (TN) - Russell Howard/Jimmy Li; Glenbrook North High School (IL) - Ethan Camp/Joe Rosenblat

== Lincoln Douglas Debate Champions and Runners Up ==
- 1986: Hee-Sun Hong – The Bronx High School of Science (NY); Greg Hewett – Jenks High School (OK)
- 1987: Scott Tucker – Twin Lakes High School (FL); Craig Tinsky – Miami Palmetto High School (FL)
- 1988: Jonathan Koppell and Peter Colavito – The Bronx High School of Science (NY) – Close-out
- 1989: David Kennedy – Regis High School (NY); Amy Forsee – Homewood High School
- 1990: Chris Kellner – Tampa Jesuit High School (FL); Arthur Chu – Albuquerque Academy (NM)
- 1991: Jeff Marcus – Miami Palmetto High School (FL); Bill Harrington – Regis High School (NY)
- 1992: Michael Erickson – La Cueva High School (NM);Jason Baldwin – Vestavia Hills High School (AL)
- 1993: Jason Baldwin – Vestavia Hills High School (AL); Carlos Gonzales – Christopher Columbus High School (FL)
- 1994: Ann Miura – Palo Alto High School (CA); Claire Carman – Vestavia Hills High School (AL)
- 1995: Greg Goldfarb – Miami Palmetto High School (FL); Tyrenda Williams – Vestavia Hills High School (AL)
- 1996: Courtney Balentine – Valley High School (IA); David Singh – Apple Valley High School (MN)
- 1997: Hetal Doshi – Vestavia Hills High School (AL); Brian Fletcher – Valley High School (IA)
- 1998: Ari Simon – Valley High School (IA); Anna Manasco – St. James School (AL)
- 1999: Tom Zimpleman – Valley High School (IA); Ben Davidson – Vestavia Hills High School (AL)
- 2000: Seamus Donovan – Edmond North High School (OK); James Scott – Katy High School (TX)
- 2001: Tom Pryor – Hopkins High School (MN); Tommy Clancy – Westwood High School (TX)
- 2002: Jenn Larson – Millard West High School (NE); Kelsey Olson – Apple Valley High School (MN)
- 2003: Andrew Garvin – Mission San Jose High School (CA); Tom Evnen – Lincoln Southeast High School (NE)
- 2004: John McNeil – Edina High School (MN); Tim Hogan – Apple Valley High School (MN)
- 2005: David Wolfish – Greenhill School (TX); Hirsh Jain – Mission San Jose (CA)
- 2006: Stephen Hess – Mountain View High School (CA); David Weeks, Highland Park High School (TX)
- 2007: Patrick Diehl – Lynbrook High School (CA); David McGough – Greenhill School (TX)
- 2008: Chris Theis – Apple Valley High School (MN); Becca Traber – The Kinkaid School (TX)
- 2009: Chris Theis – Apple Valley High School (MN); Daniel Moerner, Mountain View / Los Altos (CA)
- 2010: Catherine Tarsney – St. Louis Park High School (MN); Ross Brown, Valley High School (IA)
- 2011: Larry Liu and Jeffrey Liu – Indian Springs School (AL) – Close-out
- 2012: Noah Star – Lexington High School (MA); Bob Overing – Loyola High School (Los Angeles) (CA)
- 2013: Rebecca Kuang – Greenhill School (TX); Richard Shmikler – Saint Louis Park High School (MN)
- 2014: Danny DeBois – Harrison High School (NY); Chris Kymn – Loyola High School (CA)
- 2015: Pranav Reddy – The Harker School (CA); David Branse – University School (FL)
- 2016: Nick Steele – Harvard-Westlake (CA); Felix Tan – Clements (CA)
- 2017: Parker Whitfill – Phoenix Country Day (AZ); Nina Potischman – Hunter College (NY)
- 2018: Brian Zhou – Greenhill (TX); Rex Evans – Santa Monica (CA)
- 2019: Ishan Bhatt – St. Andrew's Episcopal (MS); Jaya Nayar – Harvard Westlake (CA)
- 2020: Evan Li – Lexington High School (MA); Animesh Joshi – Valley High School (IA)
- 2021: Zion Dixon – Strake Jesuit College Preparatory (TX); Andrew Gong – Harvard-Westlake (CA)
- 2022: Max Perin – Sage Hill (CA); Anshul Reddy – Harker (CA)
- 2023: Muzzi Khan – Harker (CA); Karan Shah – Strake Jesuit College Preparatory (TX)
- 2024: Spencer Swickle – American Heritage Broward (FL); Justin Wen – Strake Jesuit College Preparatory (TX)
- 2025: Iva Liu – Orange County School of the Arts (CA); Om Modi – Lynbrook High School (CA)
- 2026: Bolang Zhu - Lynbrook High School (CA); Alexander Jayaratne - Head-Royce School (CA)

== Public Forum Debate Champions and Runner Ups ==
- 2004: Jay M. Robinson HS (NC) – Erin Lopez/Jordan Myers; Nova HS (FL) – Alexandra Wall/Natalia Rigol
- 2005: Albuquerque Academy (NM) – Hollie Putnam/Heather Campbell; Torrey Pines (CA) – Eric Carino/Ian Hampton
- 2006: Manchester-Essex (MA) – James Pates/Dan Cellucci; Manchester-Essex (MA) – Ross Cowman/Ryan Swanzey (Co-Champions)
- 2007: Lexington (MA) – Chrissy Kugel/Garth Goldwater; Durham Academy (NC) – Patrick Toomey/Katherine Buse
- 2008: North Allegheny (PA) – Naz El-Khatib/Claire Kairys; The Collegiate School (NY) – Charles Giardina/Jonathan Yip
- 2009: Harker School (CA) – Kelsey Hilbrich/Kaavya Gowda; Walt Whitman High School (MD) – Alex Edelman/Aaron Schifrin
- 2010: George Washington High School (CO) – Gabe Rusk/Brendan Patrick; Ridge High School (NJ) – Brian Moore/Tejus Pradeep
- 2011: Harker School (CA) – Aakash Jagadeesh/Frederic Enea; Lake Highland Preparatory School (FL) – Grant Sinnot/Jake Bayer
- 2012: NSU University School (FL) – Dalton Feeley/Daniel Rego; Walt Whitman High School (MD) – Fionn Adamian/Ben Zimmermann
- 2013: Pine View School (FL) – Arjun Byju/Mark Allseits; Ransom Everglades School (FL) – Jacob Stern/ Megan Mers
- 2014: Walt Whitman High School (MD) – Fionn Adamian/Ben Zimmermann; Walt Whitman High School (MD) – Samuel Arnesen/William Arnesen
- 2015: Walt Whitman High School (MD) – Samuel Arnesen/William Arnesen; Ridge High School (NJ) – Tim O'Shea/Oliver Tang
- 2016: Pine View School (FL) – Aravind Byju/Sho Szczepaniuk; Mission San Jose High School (CA) – Max Wu/Keshav Kundassery
- 2017: the Nueva School (CA) – Jake Mengarelli/Matthew Salah; the Blake School (MN) – Ellie Grossman/Connor Yu
- 2018: Newton South (MA) – Jay Garg/Anika Sridhar; Walt Whitman High School (MD) – Elisa McCartin/Rabhya Mehrotra
- 2019: The Blake School (MN) – Thomas Gill/Jack Johnson; Lincoln-Sudbury (MA) – Daniel Cigale/Sandeep Shankar
- 2020: The Blake School (MN) – Morgan Swigert/Jack Johnson; Westlake (TX) – Miles Dintzner/Jason Luo
- 2021: The Dalton School (NY) – Daniel Yu/Rebecca Solomon; University School (OH) – Ananth Menon/Marcus Novak
- 2022: Brentwood High School (TN) - William Hong/Sully Mrkva; Strake Jesuit College Preparatory (TX) - Ishan Dubey/Ben Goldin
- 2023: Durham Academy (NC) - Michael Hansen/Alex Huang; The Blake School (MN) - Elizabeth Terveen/Sofia Perri
- 2024: Strake Jesuit College Preparatory (TX) - Daniel Guo/Jason Zhao; St. Luke's School (CT) - Samantha Gerber/Dash Gilrain-Lennon
- 2025: Strake Jesuit College Preparatory (TX) - Daniel Guo/Jason Zhao; Plano West Senior High School (TX) - Arrman Kapoor/Anuj Lohtia
- 2026: The Nueva School (CA) - Oliver Alferness/Anika Gupta; Harker School (CA) - Leon Le/Alice Luo

== World Schools Debate Champions and Runner Ups ==
- 2024: Greenhill School (Addison, Texas) (TX) - Kaden Alibhai, Emily Hu, Sophia Li, and Sherry Zhang; Harvard Westlake (CA) - Liv Kriger, Nilufer Mistry-Sheasby, and Nathan Verny
- 2025: Greenhill School (Addison, Texas) (TX) - Sherry Zhang & Varun Mukund & Saida Bidiwala & Aditi Vikram & Jonaki Bose; Alief Kerr (TX) - Leah Ghebrelul & Abigail Nguyen & Sarah Abi Saab & Erica Carranza & Preston Nguyen

== Congressional Debate Champions and Runner Ups ==
- 2002: Kristen Soltis – Cypress Creek (FL)
- 2003: Josh Swartsel – Lake Highland Prep (FL)
- 2004: Matt Turetzky – Nova High School (FL)
- 2005: Matt Cynamon – Nova High School (FL)
- 2006: Cameron Secord – Brookwood High School (GA)
- 2007: Michael Educate – Lake Forest High School (IL)
- 2008: Mitchell Blenden – University School (FL)
- 2009: Joseph Perretta – Christopher Columbus High School (FL)
- 2010: Alex Smyk – Ridge High School (NJ)
- 2011: Rylan Schaeffer – Mountain View High School (CA)
- 2012: Gregory Bernstein – Nova High School (FL)
- 2013: Gregory Bernstein – Nova High School (FL)
- 2014: Will Mascaro – Hawken School (OH)
- 2015: Azhar Hussain – Southlake Carroll (TX)
- 2016: Katherine Kleinle – Ridge (NJ)
- 2017: Mohammad Naeem – Western (FL)
- 2018: Nicholas DeVito – Poly Prep (NY)
- 2019: Ranen Miao – Millburn (NJ)
  - Runner-Up: Nathan Felmus - Bronx Science (NY)
- 2020: Rohit Jhawar – John F. Kennedy High School (CA)
  - Runner-Up: Genevieve Cox - WB Ray High School (TX)
  - Champion Presiding Officer: Manu Onteeru – Thomas Jefferson HSST (VA)
- 2021: Andrew Sun – The Harker School (CA)
  - Runner-Up: Zachary Wu - Naperville North High School (IL)
  - Champion Presiding Officer: Joshua Hansen – Jackson Hole (WY)
- 2022: Anish Beeram - Saint Mary’s Hall (TX)
  - Runner-Up: Veer Juneja - Bellarmine College Prep (CA)
  - Champion Presiding Officer: Zachary Wu - Naperville North High School (IL)
- 2023: Tyler Luu – James Logan (CA)
  - Runner-Up: Zachary Wu - Naperville North High School (IL)
  - Champion Presiding Officer: Iris Cheng - Seven Lakes High School (TX)
- 2024: Fadhil Lawal – Seven Lakes High School (TX)
  - Runner-Up: Adrian Baek - Redlands High School (CA)
  - Champion Presiding Officer: Christopher Procaccino – The Bronx High School of Science (NY)
- 2025: Swathi Bodduluri - Pennsbury High School (PA)
  - Runner-Up: Daniel Song - East Ridge High School (MN)
  - Champion Presiding Officer: Owen Casey - The Packer Collegiate Institute (NY)
- 2026: Serena Guo - Arcadia High School (CA)
  - Runner-up: Arjun Tuli -Poland Seminary (OH)
  - Champion Presiding Officer: Elizabeth Xiao - American Heritage Broward (FL)

== Extemporaneous Speaking Champions ==
- 2013: Lillian Nellans - Des Moines Roosevelt (IA)
- 2014: Miles Saffran - Trinity Preparatory School (FL)
- 2015: Brian Anderson - LaRue County High School (KY)
- 2016: Justin Graham - Trinity Preparatory School (FL)
- 2017: Jacob Thompson - Theodore Roosevelt High School (IA)
- 2018: Nikhil Ramaswamy - Plano West Senior High School (TX)
- 2019: Katherine Rollins - Potomac School (VA)
- 2020: Katherine Rollins - Potomac School (VA)
- 2021: Katherine Rollins - Potomac School (VA)
- 2022: McKinley Paltzik - Phoenix Country Day (AZ)
- 2023: Pierce McDade - University High School (IL)
- 2024: Charlotte Reitman - NSU (FL)
- 2025: Charlotte Reitman - NSU (FL)
- 2026: Daphne Kalir-Starr - College Preparatory School (CA)

== Original Oratory Champions ==
- 2013: Nader Helmy - Apple Valley High School (MN)
- 2014: Stephanie Bernstein - Nova High School (FL)
- 2015: Lane Hedrick - Rowan County (KY)
- 2016: Eve Moll - St. Thomas Aquinas High School (FL)
- 2017: JJ Kapur - West Des Moines Valley (IA)
- 2018: Noemi Rivera - Royse City High School (TX)
- 2019: Avi Gulati - Harker School (CA)
- 2020: Katherine Rollins - Potomac School (VA)
- 2021: Jihan Abdi - Apple Valley High School (MN)
- 2022: Owen Grossman - New West Charter (CA)
- 2023: Solemei Scamaroni - Village (TX)
- 2024: Vansh Mathur - Lynbrook (CA)
- 2025: Hannah DeSouza - Potomac School (VA)
- 2026: Ella D'Auria - Syosset High School (NY)

== Dramatic Interpretation Champions ==
- 2015: Kella Merlain-Moffatt - Oxbridge Academy (CA)
- 2016: Craig Heyne - Nova High School (FL)
- 2017: Kimberly Lee - Summit High School (NJ)
- 2018: Camilla Maionica - NSU University School (FL)
- 2019: Caitlyn Woitena - J. Frank Dobie High School (TX)
- 2020: Elizabeth Lopez-Aguilar - Alief Early College High School (TX)
- 2021: Prem Ganesan - Wayzata High School (MN)
- 2022: Abigail Canalejo - American Heritage Broward (FL)
- 2023: Rachel Senn - Mercer Island High School (WA)
- 2024: Adaolisa Agbakwu - Garland (TX)
- 2025: Jamal Kirton - Newark Central (NJ)
- 2026: Lucille Adams - Summit High School (NJ)

== Duo Interpretation Champions ==
- 2015: Berger and Heyne - Nova High School (FL)
- 2016: Diaz and Ramirez - Spring Woods High School (TX)
- 2017: Fu and Tran - Fullerton Union High School (CA)
- 2018: Cosman and Wurtenberger - Cypress Bay High School (FL)
- 2019: Pai and Sasane - Ridge High School (NJ)
- 2020: Event did not occur
- 2021: Michaelson and Walton - Apple Valley High School (MN)
- 2022: Canalejo and Canalejo - American Heritage Broward (FL)
- 2023: Taylor and Largaespada - Har-Ber (AR)
- 2024: Lehman & Lehman - La Jolla HS (CA)
- 2025: Macgill & Walsh - Summit High School (NJ)
- 2026: Fisseha & Sotoye - Our Lady Of Good Counsel High School (MD)

== Humorous Interpretation Champions ==
- 2015: Craig Heyne - Nova High School (FL)
- 2016: Craig Heyne - Nova High School (FL)
- 2017: Jacob Lieberman - Nova High School (FL)
- 2018: Alexia Cosman - Cypress Bay High School (FL)
- 2019: Tanner Hemmingsen - George Washington High School (CO)
- 2020: Abigail Canalejo - American Heritage Plantation (FL)
- 2021: Reeya Kansra - Shrewsbury High School (MA)
- 2022: Oliver Laczko - America Heritage Broward (FL)
- 2023: Cat-Tam Huynh - Redlands High School (CA)
- 2024: Cat-Tam Huynh - Redlands High School (CA)
- 2025: Kylie Daum - Tuscarawas Valley (OH)
- 2026: Ehab Syed - The Quarry Lane School (CA)

== Oral Interpretation Champions ==
- 2015: Zenita Collie - Nova High School (FL)
- 2016: Craig Heyne - Nova High School (FL)
- 2017: Sterling Wertanzl - Cypress Bay High School (FL)
- 2018: Anjini Mathur - Ridge High School (NJ)
- 2019: Jack Neel - Bethlehem High School (KY)
- 2020: Jaina Jallow - Livingston High School (NJ)
- 2021: Joshua Timmons - Greenhill School (TX)
- 2022: Jocelyn Tan - Ridge High School (NJ)
- 2023: Carly Gelles - Scarsdale High School (NY)
- 2024: Abigail Underweiser - Scarsdale High School (NY)
- 2025: Jahnaiya Simpson - Newark Central (NJ)
- 2026: Juliana Bridges - Cabot High School (AR)

== Program Oral Interpretation Champions ==
- 2017: Haleigh McGirt - Jupiter High School (FL)
- 2018: Steele Schoeberl - Lift Academy (MI)
- 2019: Elise Little - Chaparral Star Academy (TX)
- 2020: Sophia Williams - Miramar High School (FL)
- 2021: Joshua Timmons - Greenhill School (TX)
- 2022: Mariam Kolley - Western High School (FL)
- 2023: Kaden Jones - University High School (OH)
- 2024: Natalie Ramirez Porras - Ridge (NJ)
- 2025: Michaela White - University (NJ)
- 2026: Coby Jones - Lindale High School (TX)

== Informative Speaking Champions ==
- 2018: Jordyn Allen - American Heritage (FL)
- 2019: Yucheng Lou - American Heritage Plantation (FL)
- 2020: Selina Chen - Saratoga High School (CA)
- 2021: Ceceilia Voss - Apple Valley High School (MN)
- 2022: Karen Cui - Jordan High School (TX)
- 2023: Jocelyn Floyd - J. Frank Dobie High School (TX)
- 2024: Cici Yang - Bear Creek (WA)
- 2025: Brystian Heine-Van Fossen - Oak Park (CA)
- 2026: Ashwin Anand - Trinity Preparatory School (FL)
