= Wakefield Dairy Complex =

Historic farm in North Carolina, United States

- U.S. National Register of Historic Places
- Location within North Carolina Location within the United States
- Nearest city: West side Falls of the Neuse Road (SR 2000), 1.2 miies north of Neuse River (12417 Falls of the Neuse Road), near Wake Forest, North Carolina
- Coordinates: 35°57′28″N 78°34′7″W
- Area: 5 acres (2.0 ha)
- Built: 1934
- Built by: Rich, S.O.
- Architectural style: Gothic-roofed barn
- MPS: Wake County MPS
- NRHP reference No.: 02001719
- Added to NRHP: January 15, 2003

Wakefield Dairy Complex is a historic commercial building associated with the Royall Mill and located at Wake Forest, Wake County, North Carolina. The complex was built in 1934, and consists of an 8,000 square foot, four-story, dairy barn with silos; a bull barn; and a calf barn. It was built to house John Sprunt Hill's Guernsey dairy herd.

It was listed on the National Register of Historic Places in 2003.
