= Trust Building (Durham, North Carolina) =

Historic skyscraper in Durham, North Carolina

- The Trust Building in 2019

General information
- Status: Completed
- Type: Multiuse
- Architectural style: Beaux-Arts
- Location: 212 West Main Street; Durham, North Carolina, U.S.
- Completed: 1905

The Trust Building was the first skyscraper in Durham, North Carolina. It is located in the Downtown Durham Historic District.

== History ==
The Trust Building was constructed in 1905 and, with five stories, it was considered the first skyscraper in Durham. It was built in the Beaux-Arts style. The original tenants were the Fidelity Bank, presided over by Benjamin Duke, and the Home Savings Bank, owned by George Washington Watts and John Sprunt Hill. In 1932, an Art Deco-style façade was added to the building.

It was, at one time, reported to be the tallest office building in North Carolina.

As of April 2025, the entire building was leased out to various businesses.
