= John Sprunt Hill House =

Historic house in North Carolina, United States

- U.S. National Register of Historic Places
- U.S. Historic district – Contributing property
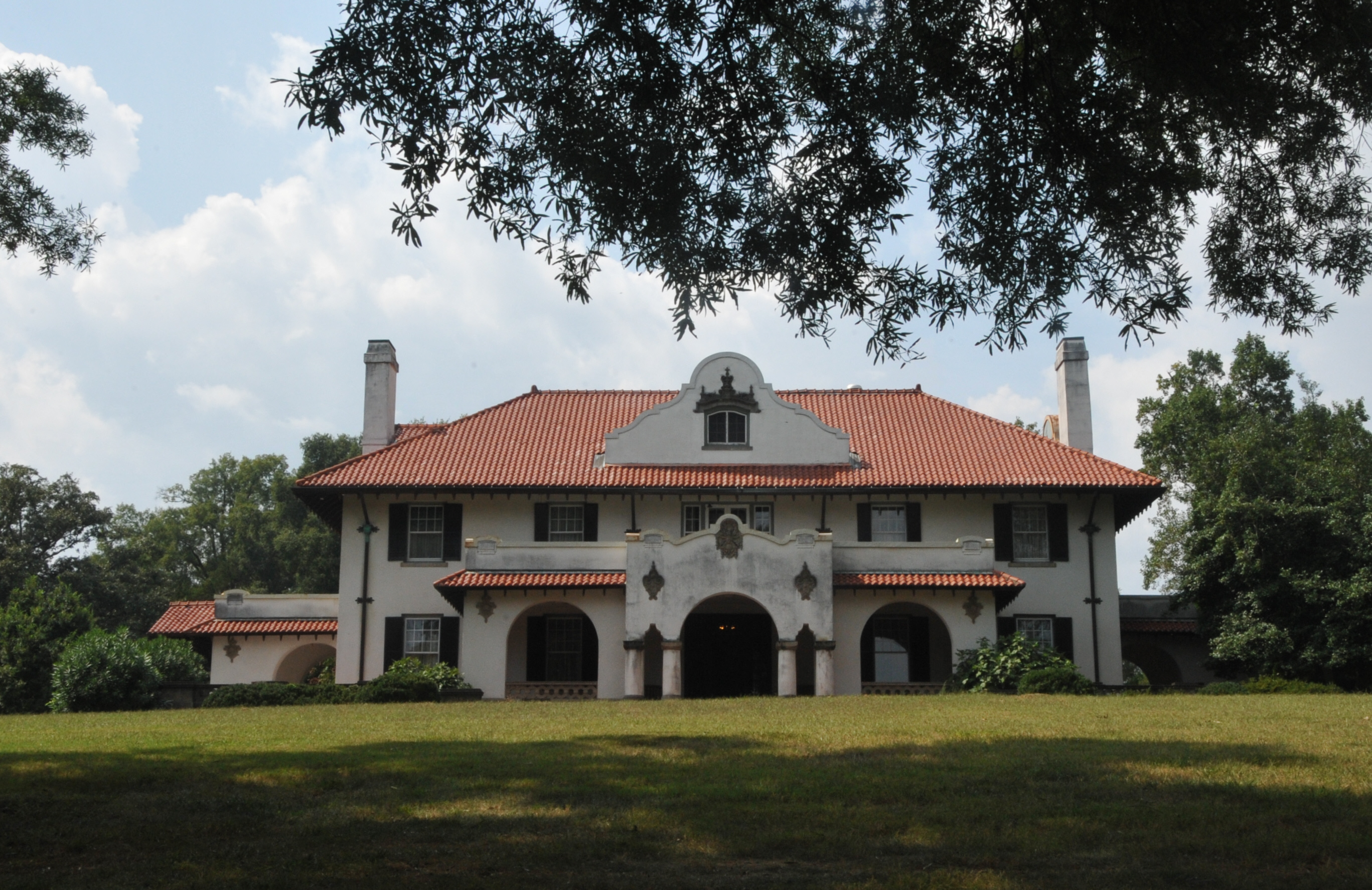

- Location within North Carolina Location within the United States
- Location: 900 S. Duke St., Durham, North Carolina
- Coordinates: 35°59′22.90″N 78°54′35.45″W
- Area: 20 acres (8.1 ha)
- Built: 1911-1912
- Architect: Kendall & Taylor; Underwood, Norman
- Architectural style: Mission/Spanish Revival
- NRHP reference No.: 78001945
- Added to NRHP: January 30, 1978

The John Sprunt Hill House is a historic mansion in the Morehead Hill Historic District of Durham, North Carolina.

== History ==
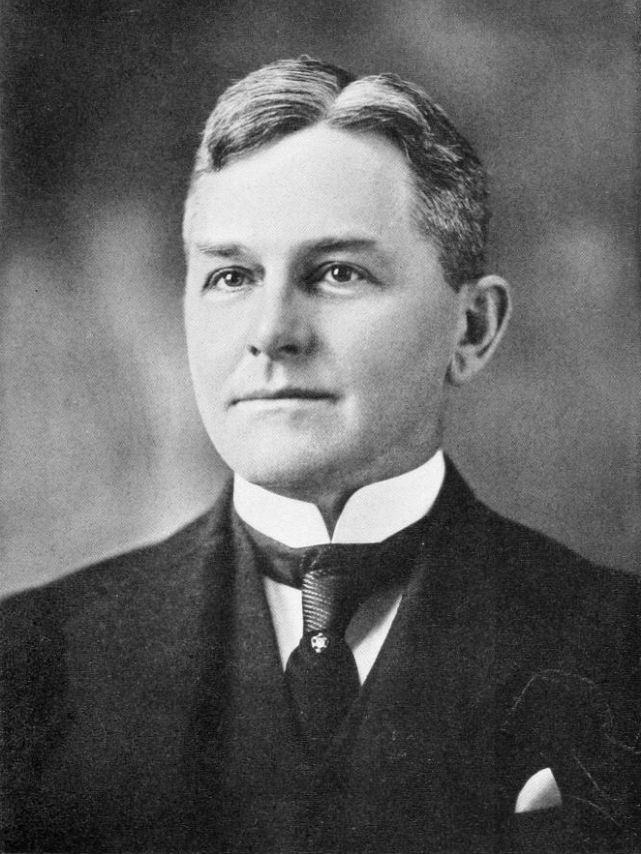
John Sprunt Hill

Built in 1911–1912, it was the home of John Sprunt Hill (1869–1961) and his wife Annie Watts Hill (died 1940), daughter of George Washington Watts, co-founder of the American Tobacco Company. It was listed on the National Register of Historic Places in 1978.

Hill bequeathed the Spanish Colonial Revival mansion to a foundation created in memory of his wife. The Annie Watts Hill Foundation was created to support non-sectarian, non-political female organizations.

=== Recent ===
As of 2008, the Junior League of Durham and Orange Counties makes its home here, although it is open to any group meeting the aforementioned criteria.
