= Central Carolina Bank and Trust =

Central Carolina Bank and Trust (CCB) was a bank headquartered in Durham, North Carolina. It began in 1961 with the merger of Durham Bank & Trust and University National Bank of Chapel Hill, North Carolina. Central Carolina Bank and Trust merged with SunTrust Banks of Atlanta, Georgia in 2005, which in turn merged with BB&T to form Truist Financial. Its headquarters was the historic 17-story Hill Building in North Carolina.

== History ==
In 1899, attorney John Sprunt Hill married Annie Louise Watts, daughter of George Washington Watts, co-founder of the American Tobacco Company. Watts and Hill started Durham Loan & Trust Company and Home Savings Bank. Hill served as president and chairman of both banks. In 1931, Durham Loan & Trust became Durham Bank & Trust. Home Savings Bank and Durham Bank & Trust merged in 1950. In 1961, Durham Bank & Trust became Central Carolina Bank and Trust Company.

In 1964, architect Frank DePasquale wanted to put a tobacco leaf on the new CCB sign to go atop the Hill Building. Bank chairman George Watts Hill, the founder's son, did not like the idea because he felt the focus should be on the bank's services, not the city's tobacco heritage. The four-sided sign instead had just "Roman-style letters, classic and unadorned". In the 1970s, CCB had an operations center stationed in the BC Remedy Building in Durham, North Carolina, currently owned by Measurement Incorporated.

In 1997, CCB announced a merger with 76-year-old American Federal Bank of Greenville, South Carolina, with 40 offices and $1.3 billion in assets. The deal, valued at $325.1 million, would give CCB $6.9 billion in assets. The American federal name would remain.

CCB had 208 branches and $8.2 billion in assets in March 2000 when National Commerce Bancorporation (NCBC) of Memphis, Tennessee, parent of National Bank of Commerce, announced a $1.94 billion purchase of CCB which was described as "a merger of equals", though NCBC would be the surviving corporation. Corporate headquarters would stay in Memphis but Durham would be the operational headquarters. NCBC chairman and chief executive officer Thomas M. Garrott would become chairman, while CCB chairman and CEO Ernest C. Roessler would become CEO of the new company. The combination would give NCBC "market capitalization of about $4.2 billion, combined assets of $15 billion, deposits of $11.3 billion and 370 branches in eight states".

NCBC had $7.3 billion in assets and 162 branches in Tennessee, Georgia, Mississippi, Virginia, West Virginia, Arkansas and North Carolina. The company was also buying Hillsborough Savings Bank, with 3 branches and $150 million in assets. Many of the NBC branches were in Kroger stores; CCB had twenty four Harris Teeter locations.

The merged bank did business as CCB in North Carolina, and as National Bank of Commerce in the remainder of its footprint.

As a result of the First Union-Wachovia merger, 25 branches of the former First Union and Wachovia banks became CCB locations on February 15, 2002. CCB would remain number three behind BB&T and Wachovia. National Commerce Financial (NCF), the newly named parent company, bought twelve other branches in Georgia and Virginia which would become NBC branches. First Bank bought the other branch, in Salisbury.

In May 2004, NCF announced it would merge with SunTrust, making SunTrust the seventh-largest bank in the United States. CCB had 3189 employees at the time, with about 1300 of those in back office jobs which could be dropped after the merger. On July 19, 2004, the merging banks announced SunTrust would have 254 branches and 1900 employees in its Carolinas group, to be based in Durham and covering the same territory as CCB before the NCF merger. The Carolinas group would be the fourth SunTrust territory; the others were Atlanta, Richmond and Washington, D.C. Also announced at that time were the fates of NCF's major executives. NCF chief operating officer Richard Furr would head the Carolinas group. Scott Edwards, chief administrative officer, would become head of credit for the Carolinas and be based in Durham. Robert Jones would succeed the retiring Richard Glover as Triangle-area president. John Stallings, NCF head of retail banking, would oversee SunTrust's Carolinas group retail business. NCF Atlanta region president would take over the Carolinas group commercial and commercial real estate areas.

In October, CCB announced the loss of 107 mortgage and loan servicing jobs. On December 16, CCB announced 293 of approximately 600 jobs would be cut at the Durham operations center once accounts were merged in April 2005, at which time SunTrust signs would replace CCB. The jobs would be moved to SunTrust facilities in Orlando, Knoxville and other locations. At the same time, 40 jobs were being added in Durham. Also, 55 jobs were being cut in Memphis, while seven were being added. In all, layoffs and additions meant a net loss of 127 NCF jobs.

SunTrust intended to continue using the Hill Building, almost entirely used by CCB, for its Carolinas headquarters. The CCB sign on top of the building would come down. SunTrust CEO Phillip Humann said SunTrust would keep CCB's community focus.

After making a deal to move in November 2006 to the Diamond View office development elsewhere in downtown Durham, SunTrust sold the Hill Building to Greenfire Development for $4.1 million in July 2006. SunTrust planned to keep a branch in the building.
