= S. H. Kress and Co. Building (Durham, North Carolina) =

Building in Durham, North Carolina

- Kress Building in 2011

General information
- Status: Completed
- Type: Multiuse
- Architectural style: Art Deco
- Location: 101 West Main Street; Durham, North Carolina, U.S.
- Coordinates: 35.9949°N 78.9010°W
- Completed: 1932

S. H. Kress and Co. Building, also simply known as the Kress Building, is a historic Art Deco building in the Downtown Historic District in Durham, North Carolina, United States.

== History ==
In 1932, the S. H. Kress & Co. moved their Durham department store from their previous location, at 113 West Main Street, to 101 West Main Street, demolishing the original brick Sneed-Markham-Taylor Building at that location and construction a new Art Deco-style building. The Kress store moved out of the building in the 1970s and the structure was repurposed as an office building.

The Kress building was the reportedly the sight of an alleged haunting in 1940s, where building employee Anna Lee Powers claimed to have been tormented by a ghost.

The building was repurposed again in the 2010s as luxury condominiums.
