= George Watts Hill =

American banker and philanthropist

- Born: October 27, 1901; New York, New York
- Died: January 20, 1993 (aged 91); Chapel Hill, North Carolina
- Education: University of North Carolina at Chapel Hill (B.S. 1922, J.D. 1924)
- Occupations: Banker, Philanthropist
- Spouse(s): Ann Austin McCulloch (September 30, 1924-1974); Anne Gibson Hutchison(1975-1993)
- Children: George Watts Hill, Jr. Ann Dudley Hill; John Sprunt Hill II
- Parent(s): John Sprunt Hill and Annie Louise Watts

George Watts Hill (October 27, 1901 – January 20, 1993) was an American banker, hospital administrator and philanthropist who played a key role in the socioeconomic development of Durham, North Carolina, the University of North Carolina at Chapel Hill and the Research Triangle Park. He was also instrumental in health care reform, the desegregation of Durham, the education of children with learning disabilities, and the removal of the Speaker Ban Law.

== Biography ==
Born in New York City, the son of John Sprunt Hill and Annie Louise Watts, George Watts Hill grew up in Durham and attended the University of North Carolina at Chapel Hill where he earned a Bachelor of Science in Commerce in 1922 and Juris Doctor degree in 1924. At UNC he was a member of Sigma Alpha Epsilon fraternity. He married Ann Austin McCulloch on September 30, 1924. Following a ten-month honeymoon around the world, the couple made their home in Harwood Hall, the mansion that his grandfather, George Washington Watts, had built.

George Watts Hill briefly worked in law before, in 1926, joining the board of trustees of Watts Hospital, built in 1895 by his grandfather and had faced deficits for several years. Hill managed to reduce losses during his administration of the hospital. He also began running a farm on the site of the Quail Roost Hunt Club, a hunting lodge about ten miles north of Durham that was used by George Watts, the Duke family, and other Durham business people in the late 19th century. Hill eventually acquired Guernsey cattle, which he continued to breed and sell for decades, becoming one of the top Guernsey breeders in the nation.

During the 1920s, Hill also began serving two terms on the Durham City Council. In 1936 and 1937, he oversaw the construction of the Hill Building in downtown Durham. By this time, Hill had been named the president of the Durham Bank & Trust Co. and also president of the Home Security Life Insurance Company. In 1940, the family moved from Harwood Hall to a new home at Quail Roost.

As World War II unfolded, Hill became a political advocate for the United States joining the Allied Forces. He was an active member of the Fight for Freedom group in 1941, and, after the attack on Pearl Harbor, he looked for a way to join the armed forces. He applied for a commission in the Navy, but was asked to join the Office of the Coordinator of Information, which eventually became the Office of Strategic Services. Hill did research and administrative work during the early part of the war. He spent some time working in England and Scotland and later in Washington, D.C. His work during the later part of the war involved securing war supplies and devices, including secret explosive devices and spy gadgets. Some of these items are owned by the North Carolina Museum of History in Raleigh.

Following the war, Hill continued to work in Durham at the family businesses and at Watts Hospital, as well as with organizations that promoted better medical care for North Carolinians. His work with the Hospital Care Association and the Hospital Savings Association led to their eventual merger with Blue Cross Blue Shield. In 1957, he began partnering with other local businessmen to develop what would eventually become Research Triangle Park. During 1963, Hill served on the Durham Interim Committee, a group appointed by the mayor of Durham to help ease racial tensions caused by segregation.

Hill was active in service and philanthropy towards the University of North Carolina. He was appointed to its board of trustees in 1955 and served on the executive committee. During his tenure, the board was involved with the Speaker Ban debate, consolidation of the university system, the sale of public utilities, and general planning questions. According to UNC President William C. Friday, George Watts Hill “was the one member of the board that stood with me all the way through the Speaker Ban thing.”

In 1962, Hill moved to a new home in Chapel Hill and donated his Quail Roost Home and some of its land to the University, intending it to be used as a conference center. Other parts of the Quail Roost property remained with Hill's son, John Sprunt Hill II. The conference center plan was never fully realized, and the University eventually sold the property. Hill remained on the board of trustees (later the board of governors) until 1981. He continued to donate monetarily until his death.

Hill's wife Ann died in 1974. The following year, Hill married Anne Gibson Hutchison, a Durham teacher with two daughters and a son. One of the daughters had a learning disability, which prompted Hill to invest in a new program designed to help students with learning disabilities. This program eventually became a school, the Hill Center in Durham.
