= John Sprunt Hill =

American private banker and politician

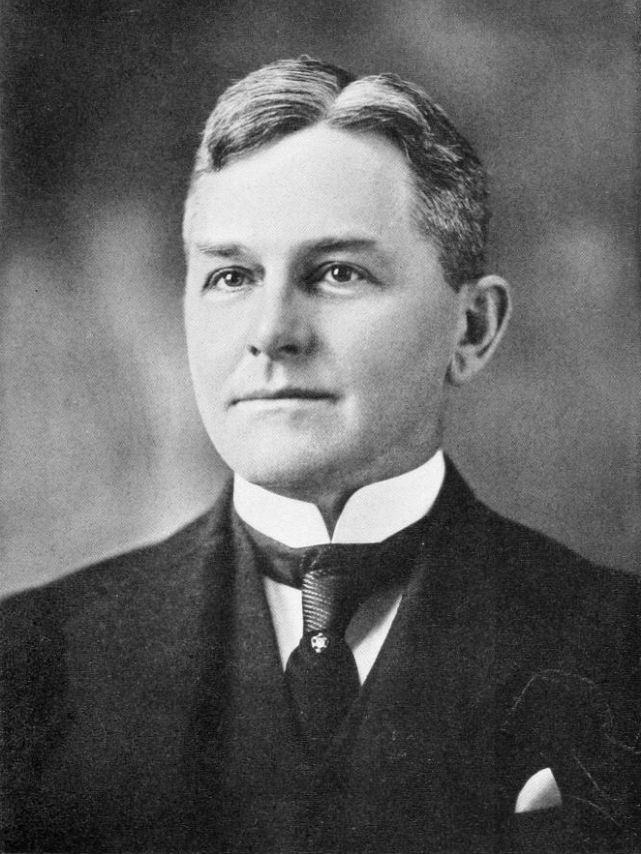

Member of the North Carolina Senate from the 16th district
- In office 1933–1938

Personal details
- Born: March 17, 1869 Faison, North Carolina, U.S.
- Died: July 29, 1961 (aged 92) Durham, North Carolina, U.S.
- Resting place: Maplewood Cemetery
- Party: Democratic
- Spouse: Annie Louise Watts (m. 1899–1940)
- Children: George Watts Hill; Laura Valinda Hill DuBose; Frances Faison Hill Fox
- Education: University of North Carolina at Chapel Hill (Ph.B. 1889); Columbia University (J.D. 1894)
- Occupation: Banker, lawyer, philanthropist
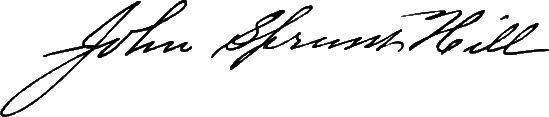
- Signature

John Sprunt Hill (March 17, 1869 – July 29, 1961) was a North Carolina lawyer, banker and philanthropist who played a fundamental role in the civic and social development of Durham, North Carolina, the expansion of the University of North Carolina at Chapel Hill and the development of rural credit unions in North Carolina during the first half of the 20th century.

== Biography ==
=== Early life and education ===
Born in Faison, in Duplin County, North Carolina to William Edward Hill and Frances Diana Hill, John Sprunt Hill left school at age twelve, to work as a clerk in a country store for four years. He then attended the University of North Carolina at Chapel Hill, where he was a member of Sigma Alpha Epsilon fraternity and one of the co-founders of the Order of Gimghoul, and graduated maxima cum laude in 1889 with a Ph.B.

For two years, Hill taught at Faison High School, until he began attending law school at UNC in 1891. In 1892, he moved to New York City to complete his degree at Columbia University. Hill graduated from Columbia Law in 1894 and was admitted to the New York bar association and began practicing estate law, becoming a well-regarded and successful lawyer with his own firm, Hill, Sturcke & Andrews, by January 1895. In 1898, Hill volunteered to serve in the U.S. Army in the Spanish–American War, fighting in Puerto Rico.

Following the war, he returned to Manhattan, continuing his law practice and becoming involved with the Democratic Party. He joined and served as a leader in groups like the Reform Club and the Young Men's Democratic Club. In 1900, John Sprunt Hill ran, unsuccessfully, as a Democrat, for a seat in the United States House of Representatives, representing the heavily Republican 14th district of New York.

=== Return to North Carolina ===
While attending Columbia, John Sprunt Hill met and became romantically involved with fellow-student Annie Louise Watts, daughter of North Carolina businessman George Washington Watts, who had co-founded the American Tobacco Company with James B. Duke. John Sprunt Hill married Watts, in New York, on November 29, 1899. In September 1903, shortly after the birth of their first child, George Watts Hill, John and Annie decided to relocate their family to Durham, to go into business with his father-in-law. He later inherited his father-in-law's house, Harwood Hall.

=== Boom and bust in the Bull City ===
G.W. Watts and J.S. Hill became powerful partners in the burgeoning Bull City. Together, they founded the Home Savings Bank, where Hill served as president, and Durham Loan & Trust Company, where he served as chairman of the board, almost immediately upon Hill's arrival in Durham. From 1908 to 1910, J.S. Hill served as vice-president of Erwin Cotton Mills. In 1916, Watts and Hill founded the Home Security Life Insurance Company.

During the Great Depression, Watts and Hill reorganized the Durham Loan & Trust Company into the Durham Bank & Trust Company in 1931. In 1950, Home Savings Bank merged with the Durham Bank & Trust. In early 1961, Durham Bank & Trust merged with University National Bank of Chapel Hill to become Central Carolina Bank and Trust.

== "Father of Rural Credit Unions" ==
In 1913, Hill traveled to Europe in an effort to study rural credit systems that had sprung up there in response to widespread poverty. He returned to the United States intent on implementing a similar system at home. North Carolina of that time was more than 80% rural, and the economy farm-based, with a majority of residents living in poverty. He addressed farmers' organizations and congressional committees on the subject. Hill remarked that, "Credit union membership is a certificate of character and a badge of honor. Let a person stay in the credit union for ten years and it changes his whole philosophy of life—it is a modern miracle." Soon after passage of the North Carolina Credit Union Act on March 6, 1915, North Carolina's first credit union opened in 1916, in the southern Durham County community of Lowe's Grove. Twenty farmers in the Durham County community pooled $101.75, and the credit union movement was born. E. C. Branson, in a sketch published in 1918, called Hill the "Father of Rural Credit in North Carolina."

== State politics ==
John Sprunt Hill served on the North Carolina Highway Commission from its inception in 1921 through 1931, helping to create the largest state maintained highway network in the United States.

In 1932, he successfully ran for a seat in the North Carolina Senate, serving Durham County as the representative of the 16th State Senate District from 1933 to 1938.

== Philanthropy ==
=== Recreation ===
A golf enthusiast, Hill began building what became the Hillandale Country Club in Durham in 1909. Hill opened the course the 149-acre (0.60 km^{2}) golf course, designed by Donald Ross, who drafted the first 9 holes in 1909 and Perry Maxwell, who drafted the back 9 in 1915, to public use in 1934, finalizing the transaction by 1939 by donation to the Durham Foundation.

He gave the city land for Hillside Park. He acquired the golf course at Forest Hills and donated it to the city for a park in 1930. He donated a large tract of land on the East side of town to the city in 1932 for parkland, which the city divided up into a park for African-Americans (East End) and for whites (Long Meadow). He donated land for a park at Branch Pl and Proctor, no longer extant. In 1933, he donated $20,000 to the city to purchase Durham Athletic Park and funded the reconstruction of the stadium after it burned down in 1939.

=== Durham ===
In 1917, John Sprunt Hill, George W. Watts, James B. Duke and Benjamin N. Duke donated a sum of $8,500 to purchase the old Stokes homesite on Fayetteville Street, in order to relocate and expand Lincoln Hospital, Durham's primary hospital for African-Americans in the days of segregation.

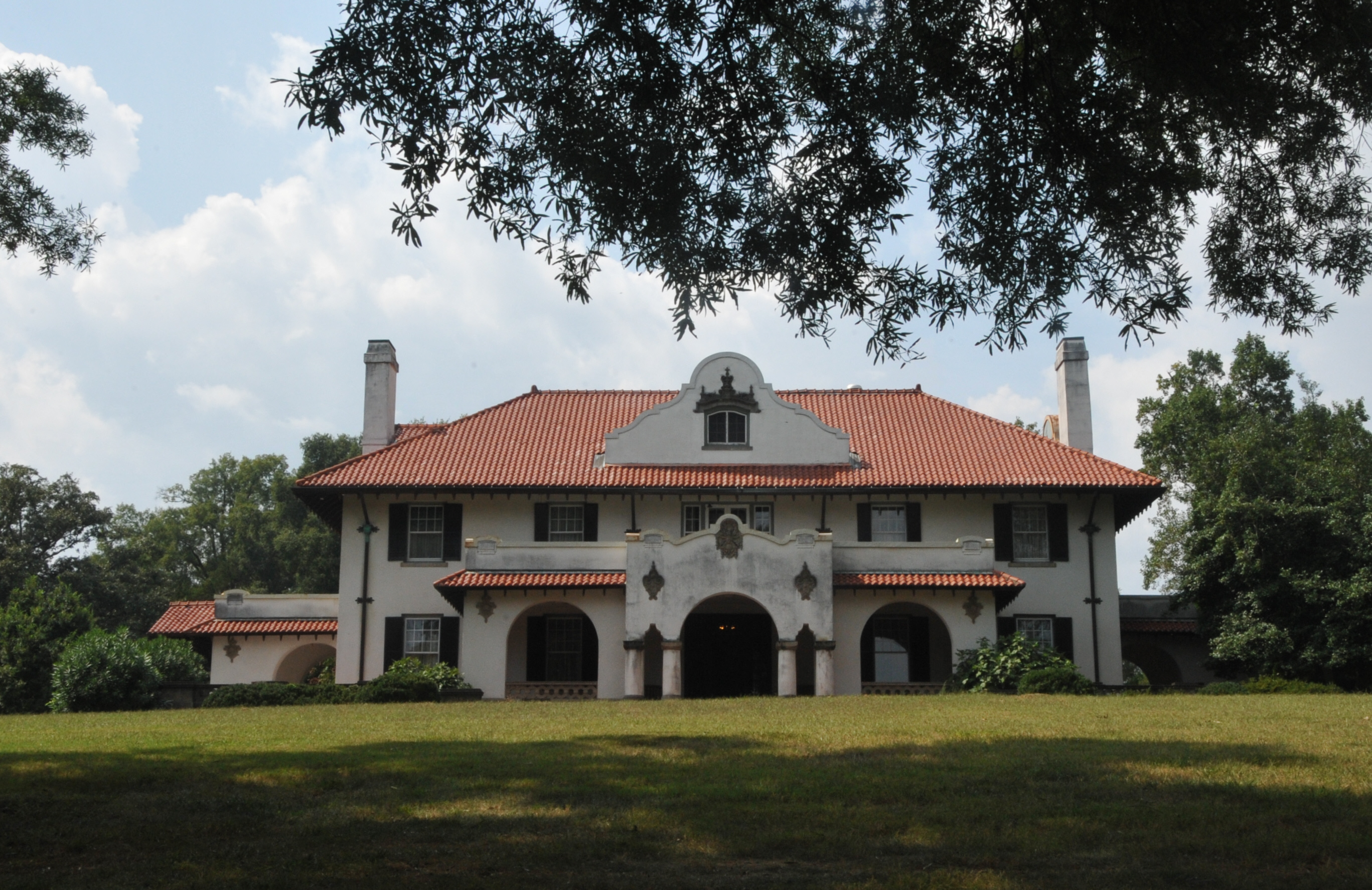
The John Sprunt Hill House

In 1930, John Sprunt Hill offered the John O'Daniel Hosiery Mills building for a Farmer's Exchange—a farmers' cooperative which grew to 900 members by 1935. The decline in tobacco sales during the late-1920s, due to blight, spurred the need for farmers to market other farm products. The JOD Hosiery Mill became Durham's first Farmers' Market—what was referred to as a "curb market" at the time—where the farmers would sell some of their produce directly. These early curb markets were evidently operated exclusively by women—offering "an extra source of income through the sale of poultry, eggs, baked and pickled goods, and fresh flowers and vegetables in season."

Upon his death, in 1961, John Sprunt Hill donated his Morehead Hill Spanish Colonial Revival mansion, designed by Kendall and Taylor of Boston and built in 1912, to a foundation created in memory of his wife, who died on March 26, 1940. The Annie Watts Hill Foundation was created to support non-sectarian, non-political female organizations. As of 2008, the Junior League of Durham and Orange Counties makes its home here, although it is open to any group meeting the aforementioned criteria. The John Sprunt Hill House was listed on the National Register of Historic Places in 1978. His Wakefield Dairy Complex near Wake Forest was listed in 2003.

== The University of North Carolina ==
John Sprunt Hill's longest-running philanthropic interest was his love of the University of North Carolina at Chapel Hill. A generous donor from the time of his graduation in 1889 until his death, Hill was named a trustee of the University of North Carolina in 1904 and remained a trustee for the rest of his life. John Sprunt Hill was selected to give the commencement address to the graduating class of 1903.

Hill served as chair of the building committee during the 1920s, when the university received its first major state appropriation for new construction since the American Civil War. He oversaw the location and building of Manning and Carroll halls and the halls that flank them, as well as Wilson Library and Memorial Auditorium, effectively creating the quad at Polk Place.

In 1930, with the completion of Wilson as UNC's new library, the Hills donated most of the funds needed to renovate Carnegie Library, for use as the new home for the music department, itself only a decade old. The couple stipulated that the building, renamed Hill hall, could only be used for music, stipulating frequent concerts and recitals.

A lifelong student of history and literature, on May 9, 1948, Hill established an endowment fund for the North Carolina Collection of the UNC Library. John Sprunt Hill also endowed a chair in the university's department of history.

=== The Carolina Inn ===
In 1920, the Hills began building the Carolina Inn, which was completed next to the UNC campus in 1924 in order "to provide for the special wants and comforts of the University alumni... and University visitors." In 1935, they donated the hotel to the university, stipulating that the profits from the Inn would support what would later become the North Carolina Collection in UNC's Wilson Library.
