= Hill Building =

Building in North Carolina, United States

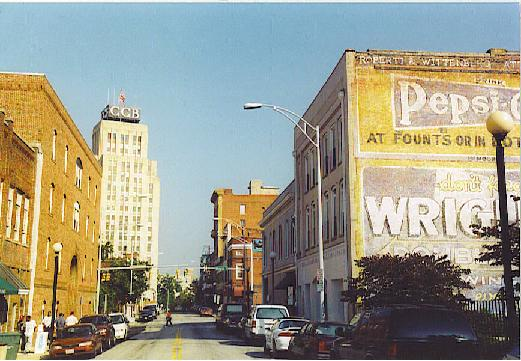
- Historic View of Hill Building From Parrish Street
- Interactive map of the Hill Building area
- Former names: CCB Building SunTrust Building

General information
- Type: office
- Architectural style: Art Moderne
- Location: 111 Corcoran Street; Durham, North Carolina, US
- Coordinates: 35.996133°N 78.901749°W
- Construction started: 1935
- Completed: 1937
- Owner: Greenfire Real Estate Holdings and 21c Museum Hotels
- Operator: 21c Museum and Hotels

Height
- Top floor: 17

Design and construction
- Architects: George Watts Carr of Durham, NC was the Architect; Shreve, Lamb & Harmon of Empire State Bldg. fame were design consultants
- Developer: Greenfire Development

The Hill Building is a 17-story modernistic skyscraper located in Durham, North Carolina. Built in 1935–1937, the Hill Building was designed by George Watts Carr. New York City architecture firm Shreve, Lamb & Harmon best known for the design of the Empire State Building, acted as consultants.

Named for John Sprunt Hill, and built to house the Durham Bank & Trust Company, the building is outfitted with Art Deco ornamentation, interior fluted doors and an exquisitely crafted letter box. The building is in the heart of downtown Durham, located at the intersection of Main and Corcoran Streets. The Hill building was home to Durham Bank & Trust and its successor, Central Carolina Bank and Trust, from 1937 until its 2005 purchase by SunTrust Banks, which had its local headquarters in the building until 2006.

Greenfire Real Estate Holdings, which bought the Hill Building in 2006, successfully renovated the building into a 165-room luxury hotel. The city of Durham voted to add $4.2 million after a September 20, 2010 public hearing regarding this plan, and Durham County voted to add $1 million. Greenfire hoped historic tax credits would provide $11 million, and other tax credits would add $4 million.

In February 2013, Greenfire formed a joint venture with Kentucky-based hotel operator 21C Museum Hotels. Construction began in late July 2013 and was completed in 2015.

Skanska was in charge of the construction project in partnership with 21c Museum Hotels. The renovation also includes a plan for a contemporary art museum, upscale restaurants, bar and ballroom. The museum is open 24 hours per day and offers free admission. An estimated $48 million was spent to complete the entire renovation for the Hill Building. The hotel itself was inducted into Historic Hotels of America, the official program of the National Trust for Historic Preservation, in 2019.

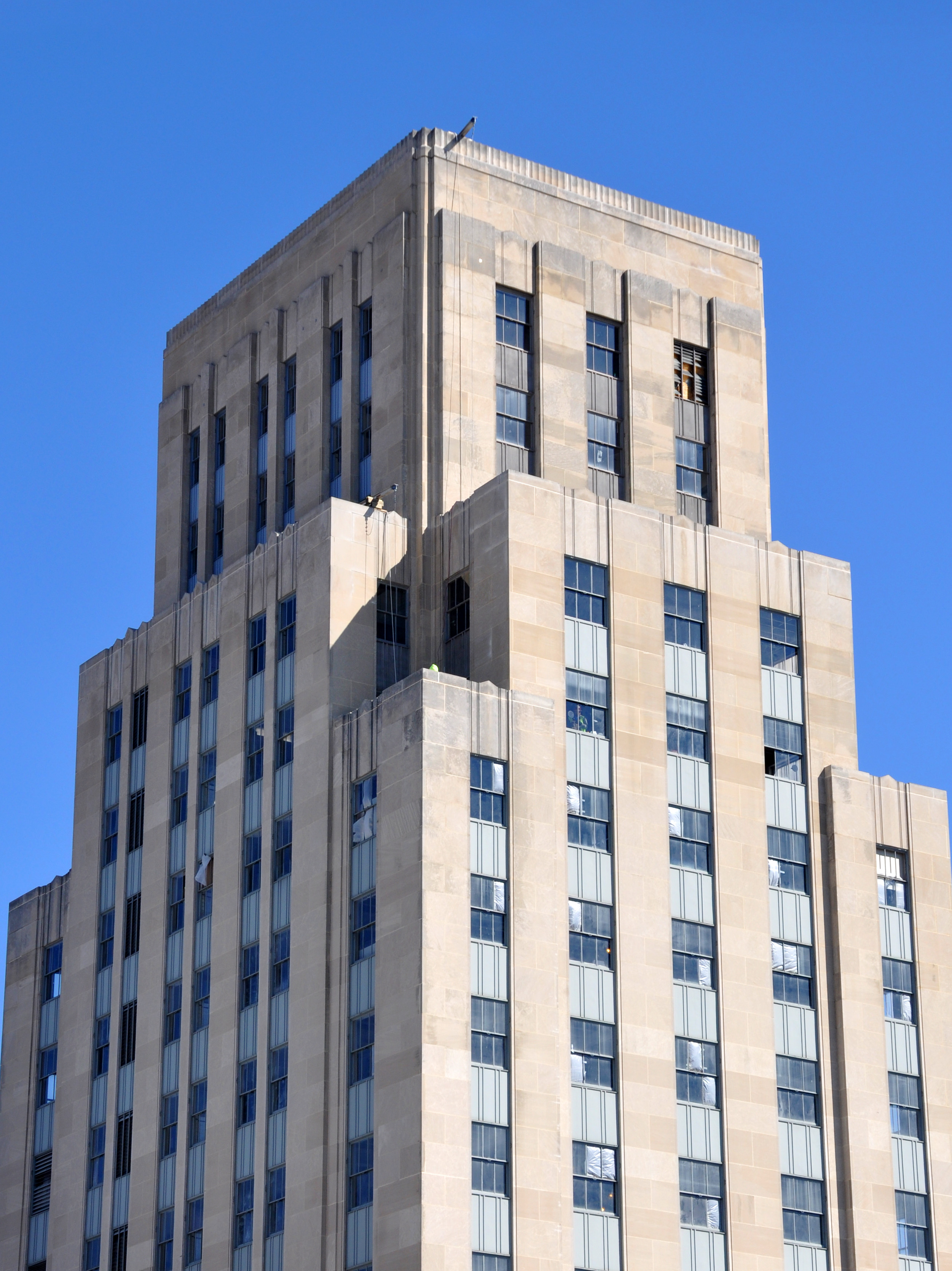
Closeup view of Hill Building

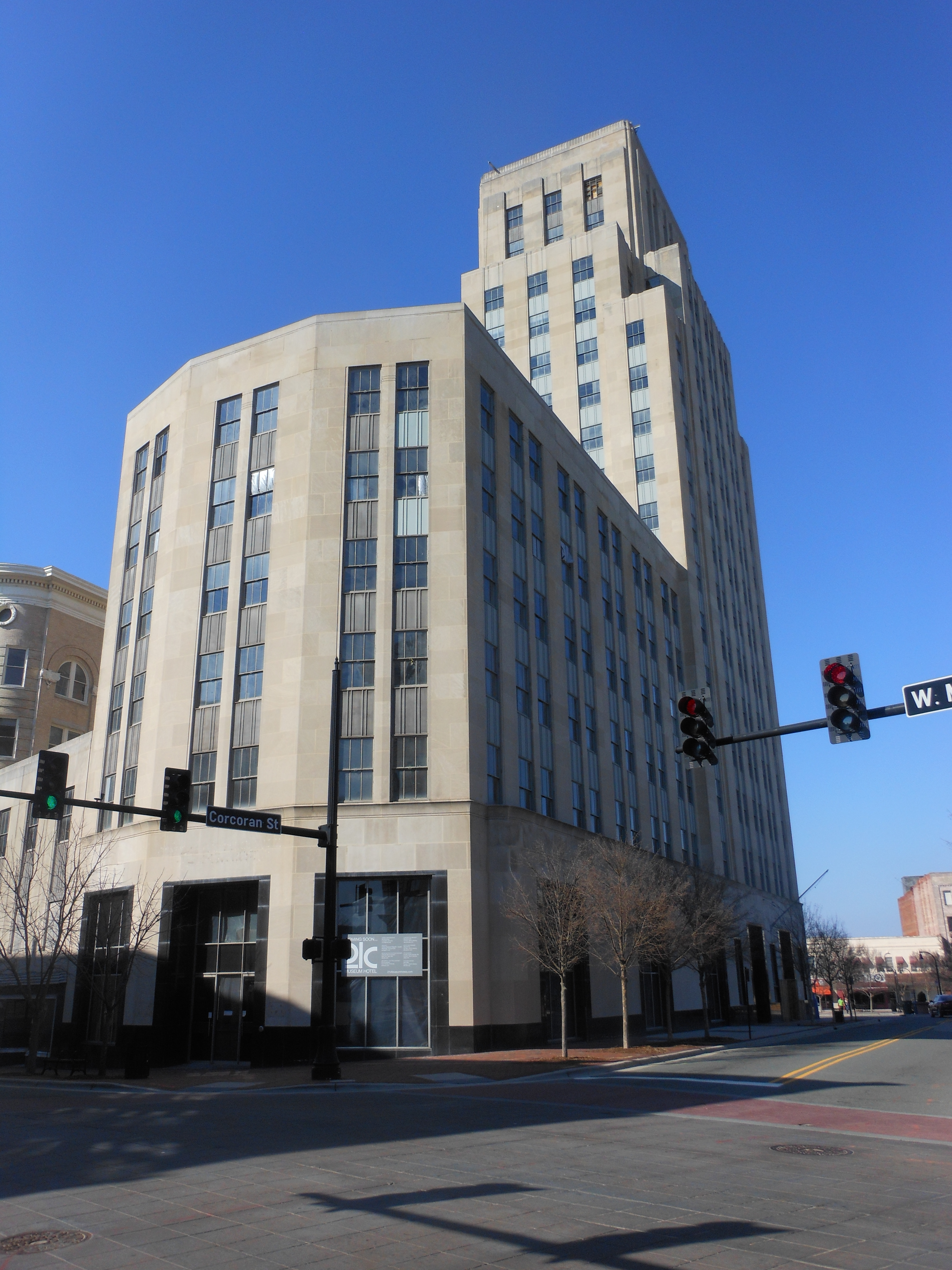
Hill Building at Corcoran Street

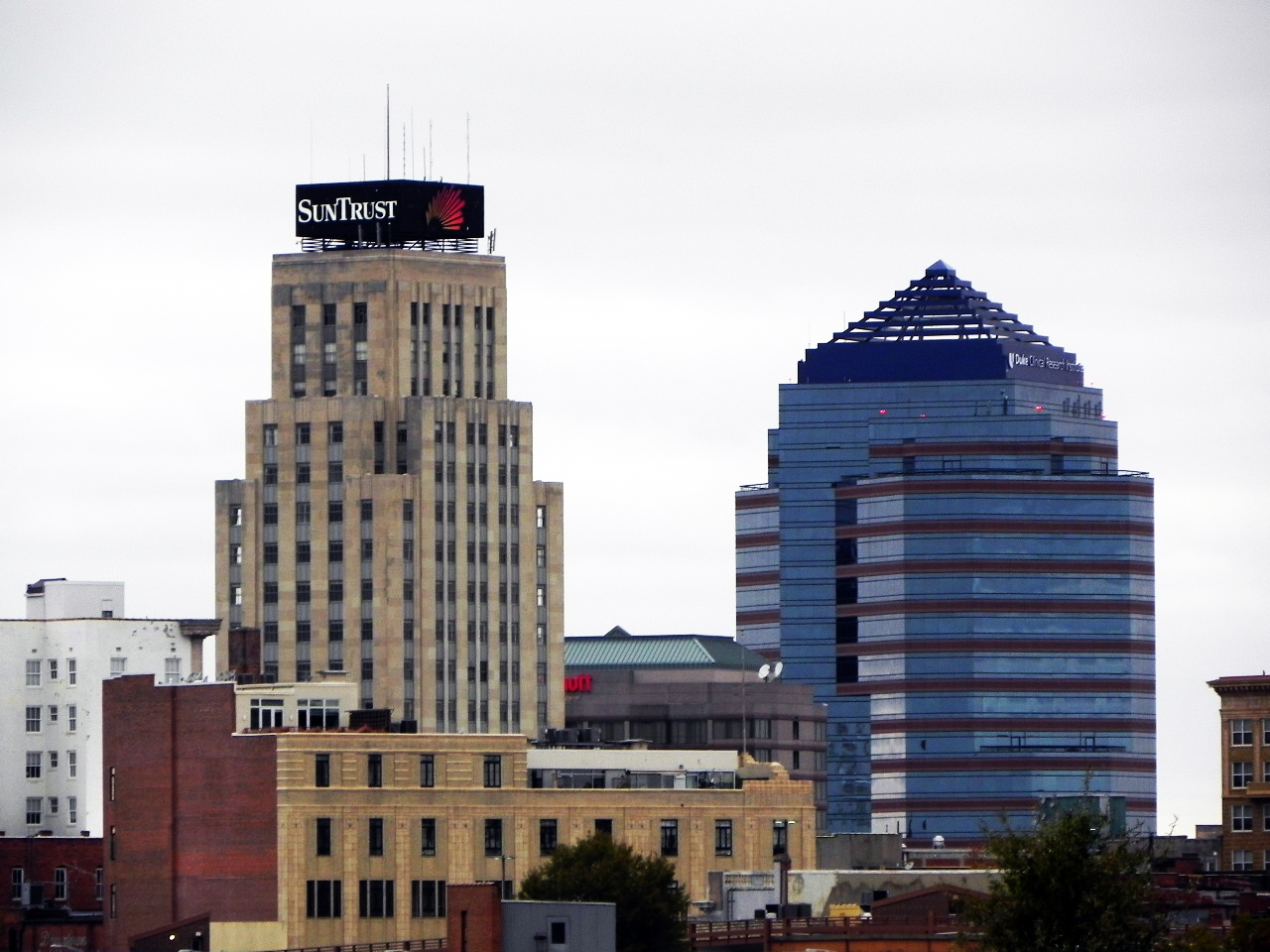
Hill Building in contrast to the Duke Clinical Research Institute, both dominating Durham's skyline

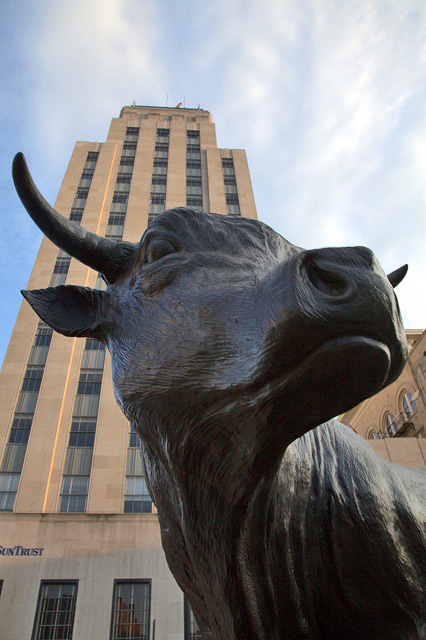
"Durham Bull" Statue In Front of Hill Building

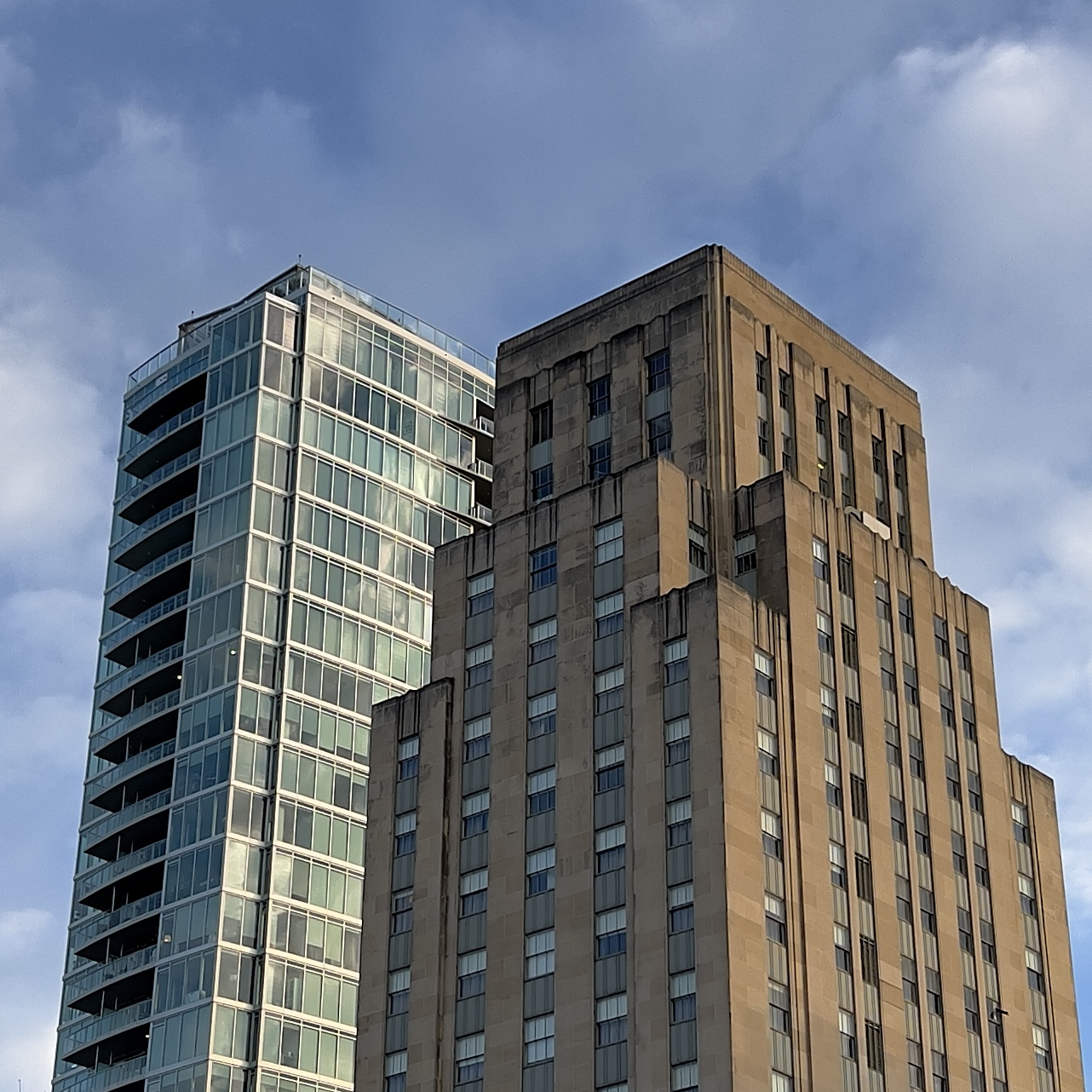
Hill Building juxtaposed next to One City Center, across the street

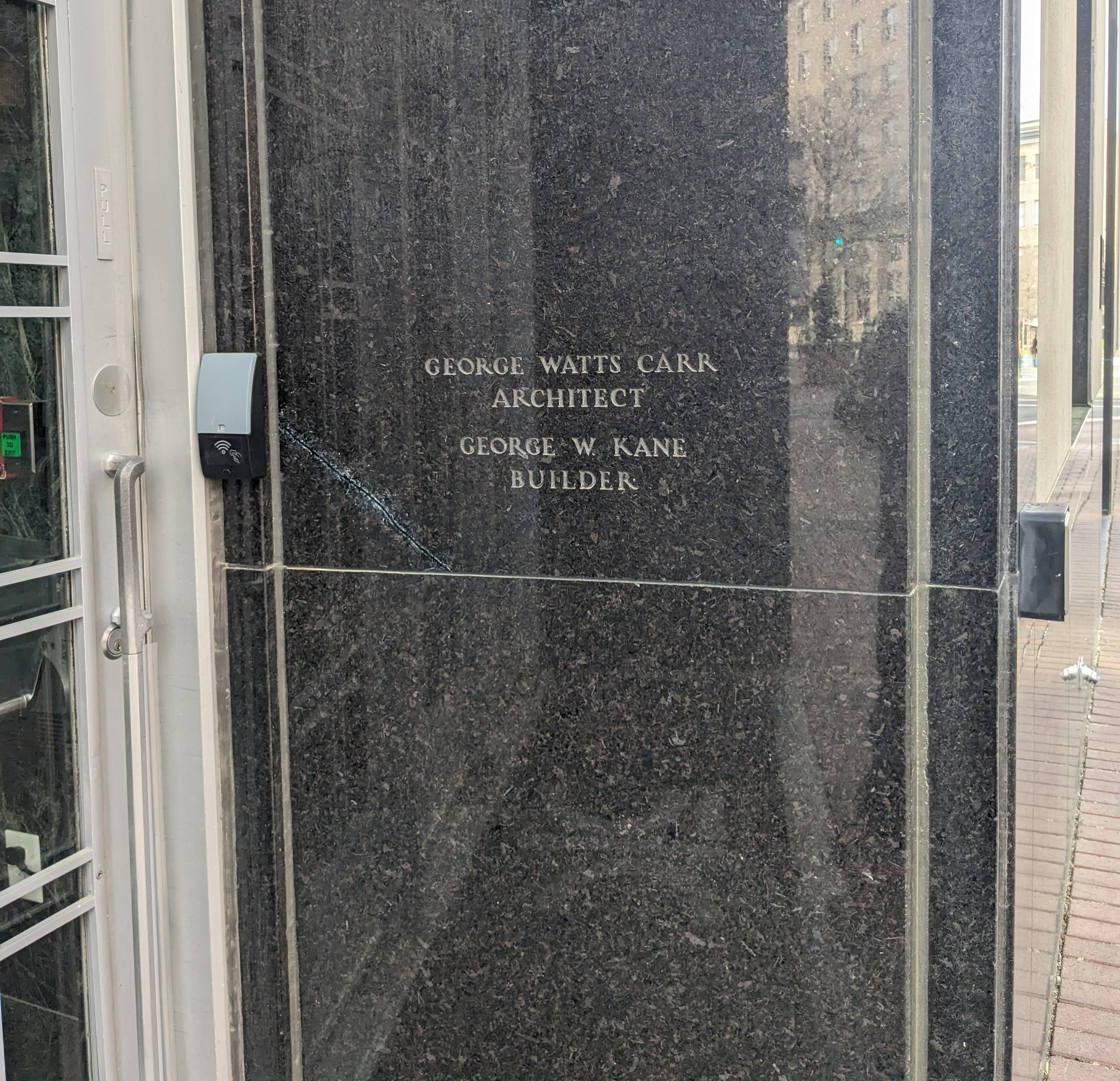
Engraving identifying George Watts Carr as the architect of the building.
