= Salam Academy =

Location
- 735 N. Plano Rd; Richardson, Texas 75081; United States; 32.959266°N 96.700962°W

Information
- Type: Private school
- Motto: Faith Character and Excellence in Education
- Established: 2003 (Part-time) 2008 (Full-time)
- Principal: Abdul Shehriyar
- Grades: PreK-12
- Enrollment: 250 (2017)
- Colors: Blue and Red
- Website: Official Website

Salam Academy is an Islamic PreK–high school in Richardson, Texas. It was established as a part-time school in 2003 and added a full-time school in fall 2008. As of 2014 it had 315 students, 90% being South Asian, 5% being Arab, and 5% being non-Hispanic white, Hispanic, and Black. It is not affiliated with any particular mosque.
