= First Baptist Church (Durham, North Carolina) =

Baptist church in Durham, North Carolina

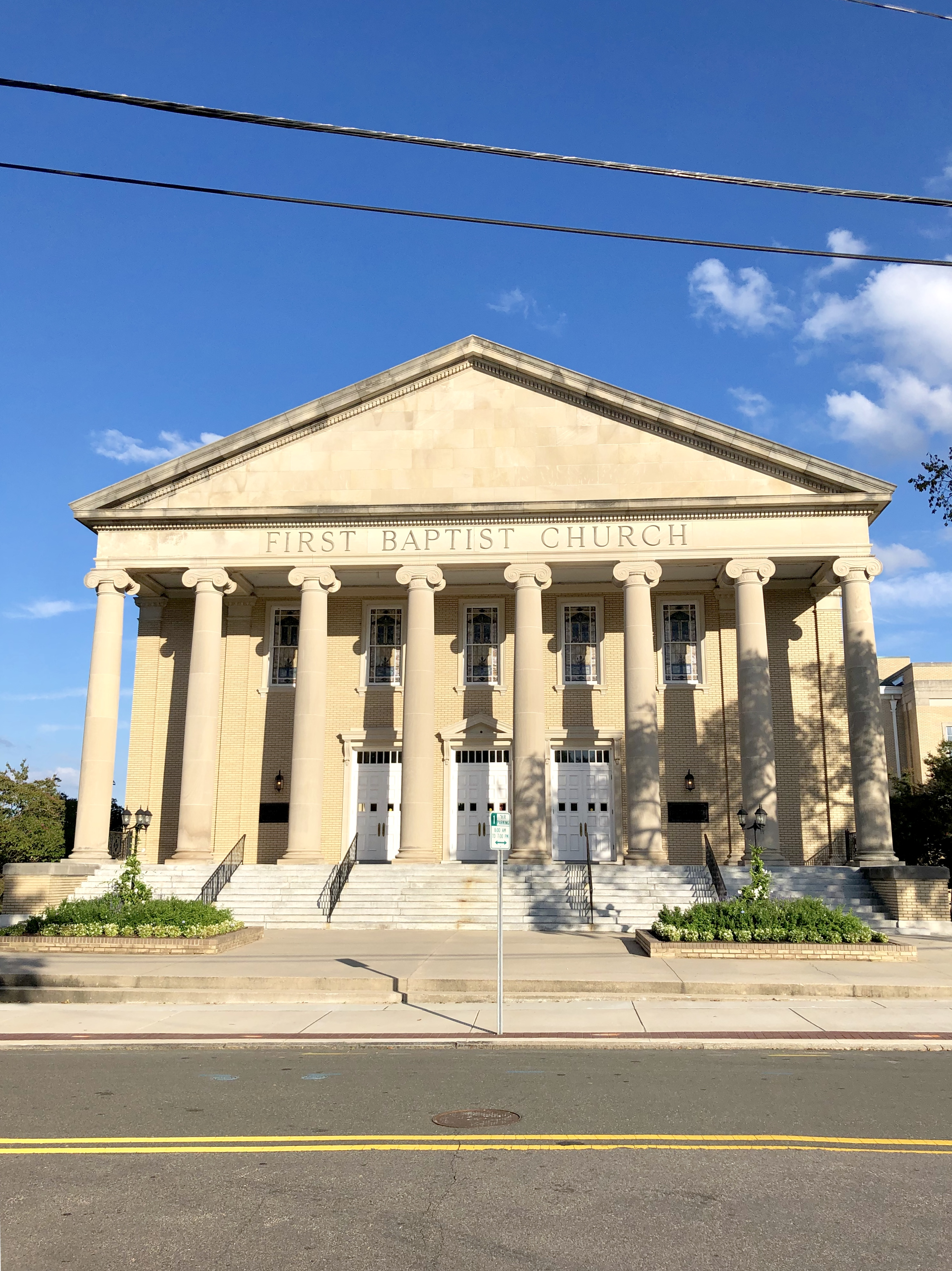
- First Baptist Church in 2019

Religion
- Affiliation: Southern Baptist
- Leadership: Rev. Andy Davis
- Status: Active

Location
- Location: 414 Cleveland Street; Durham, North Carolina, United States
- Interactive map of First Baptist Church
- Coordinates: 35°59′49″N 78°53′49″W

Architecture
- Architect: Reuben H. Hunt
- Type: Neoclassical Revival
- Completed: 1927

Website
- fbcdurham.org

First Baptist Church, also known as FBC Durham, is a historic Southern Baptist church in Durham, North Carolina. The congregation, formed in 1845, was the first established church in Durham.

== History ==
First Baptist Church was founded in 1845 as the Rose of Sharon Baptist Church, the first church in Durham, North Carolina. They held services at Piney Grove schoolhouse located one mile south of West Durham.

The congregation moved to Pettigrew Street in 1850. In 1876, Dr. Columbus Durham was appointed as the full-time pastor and the church changed its name to Durham Baptist, as another congregation in northern Durham had taken the name Rose of Sharon. In 1878, the church purchased a lot on Mangum Street in Durham's downtown and began constructing a new building. Following the establishment of Blackwell Baptist Church on West Chapel Hill Street in the 1880s, the Durham Baptist congregation was renamed First Baptist Church.

In 1927, First Baptist built a new, larger building on Cleveland Street, which is the current church building. The new Neoclassical building was designed by the architect Reuben H. Hunt.

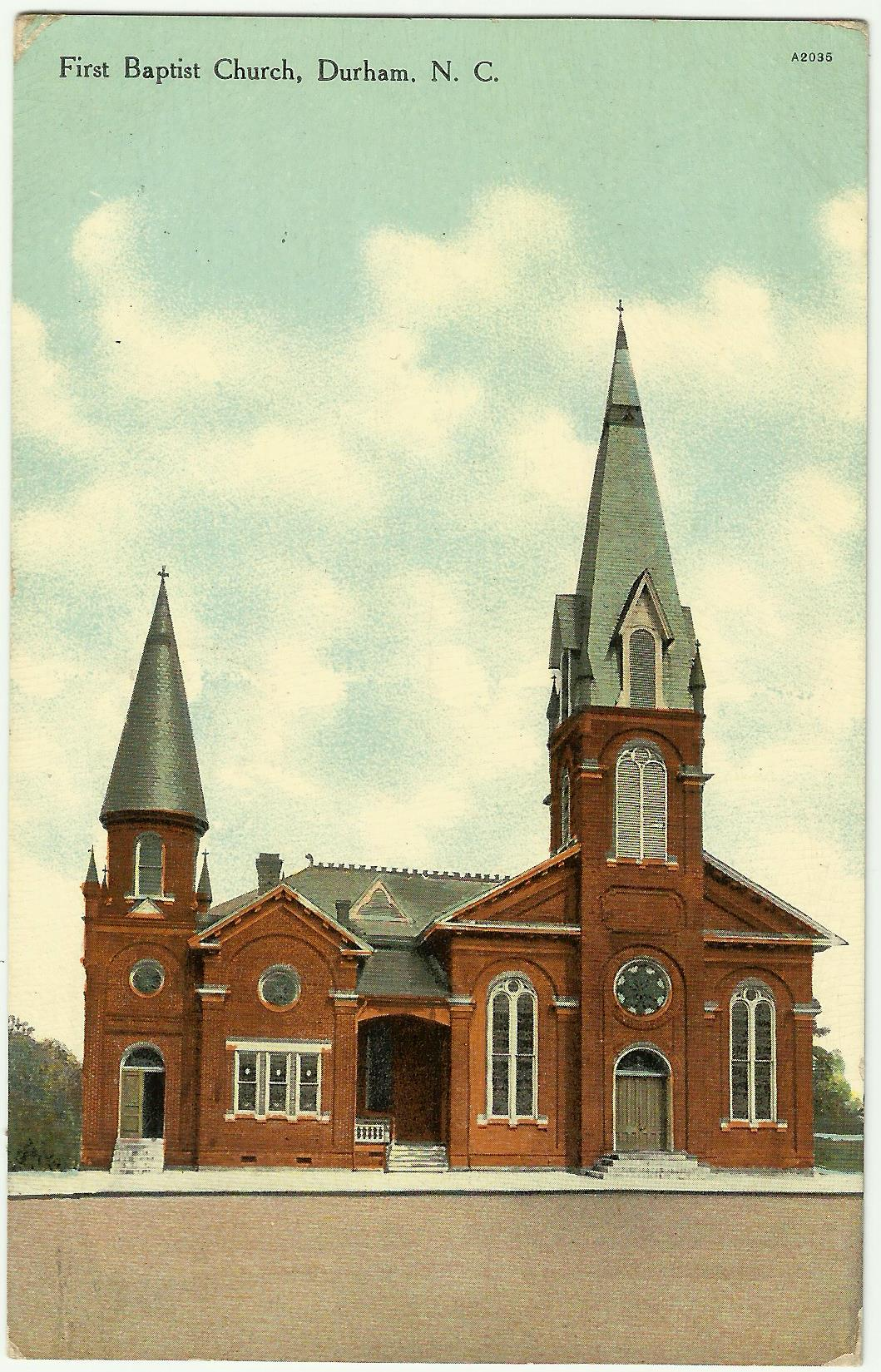
The old First Baptist Church building

First Baptist is a member of the Southern Baptist Convention.

In 1998, Rev. Andy Davis, a graduate of Southern Baptist Theological Seminary, was appointed pastor of First Baptist. In 2001, deacons and church committee chairs tried to remove Davis for preaching conservative theology regarding gender roles and authority, but they were unsuccessful.
