= Trinity United Methodist Church (Durham, North Carolina) =

Methodist church in Durham, North Carolina

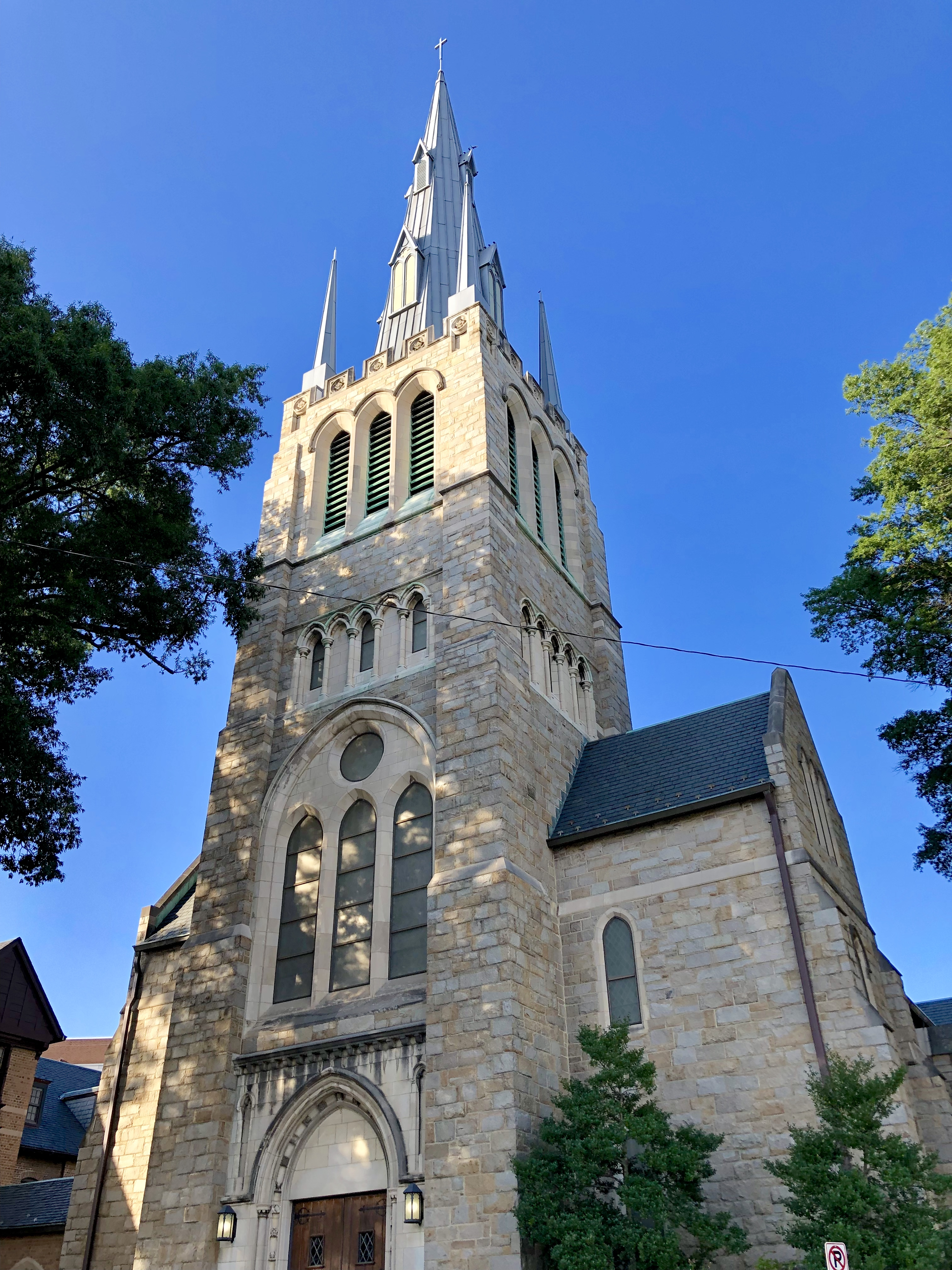
- Trinity United Methodist Church in 2019

Religion
- Affiliation: United Methodist
- Status: Active

Location
- Location: 215 N Church Street; Durham, North Carolina, United States
- Interactive map of Trinity United Methodist Church
- Coordinates: 35°59′44″N 78°53′55″W

Architecture
- Architect: Ralph Adams Cram
- Type: Gothic Revival
- Groundbreaking: 1923
- Completed: 1924

Website
- trinitydurham.org

Trinity United Methodist Church is a historic Methodist church in Durham, North Carolina.

== History ==
The congregation at Trinity, one of the oldest Methodist congregations in Durham, was founded in 1832. They were known as the Orange Grove Church and later as the Durham Methodist Church. They first met in a small school house on Raleigh Road. In 1861, they purchased the current plot of land and built a small pine wood church that sat two hundred people. The church was damaged during Sherman's March to the Sea during the American Civil War. The building was temporarily used as a military hospital for wounded soldiers and, after the war, was used a women's seminary.

In 1881, a new building was built to house the growing congregation. In 1886, the church was renamed Trinity Methodist Church. A group of congregants established a new church on Main Street in the West End neighborhood.

On January 21, 1923, the church was destroyed in a fire. The current building was constructed in 1924, designed by the architect Ralph Adams Cram, who had previously designed St. Philip's Episcopal Church. The steeple was added in 1985.
