= George Washington Watts =

American manufacturer and philanthropist (1851–1921)

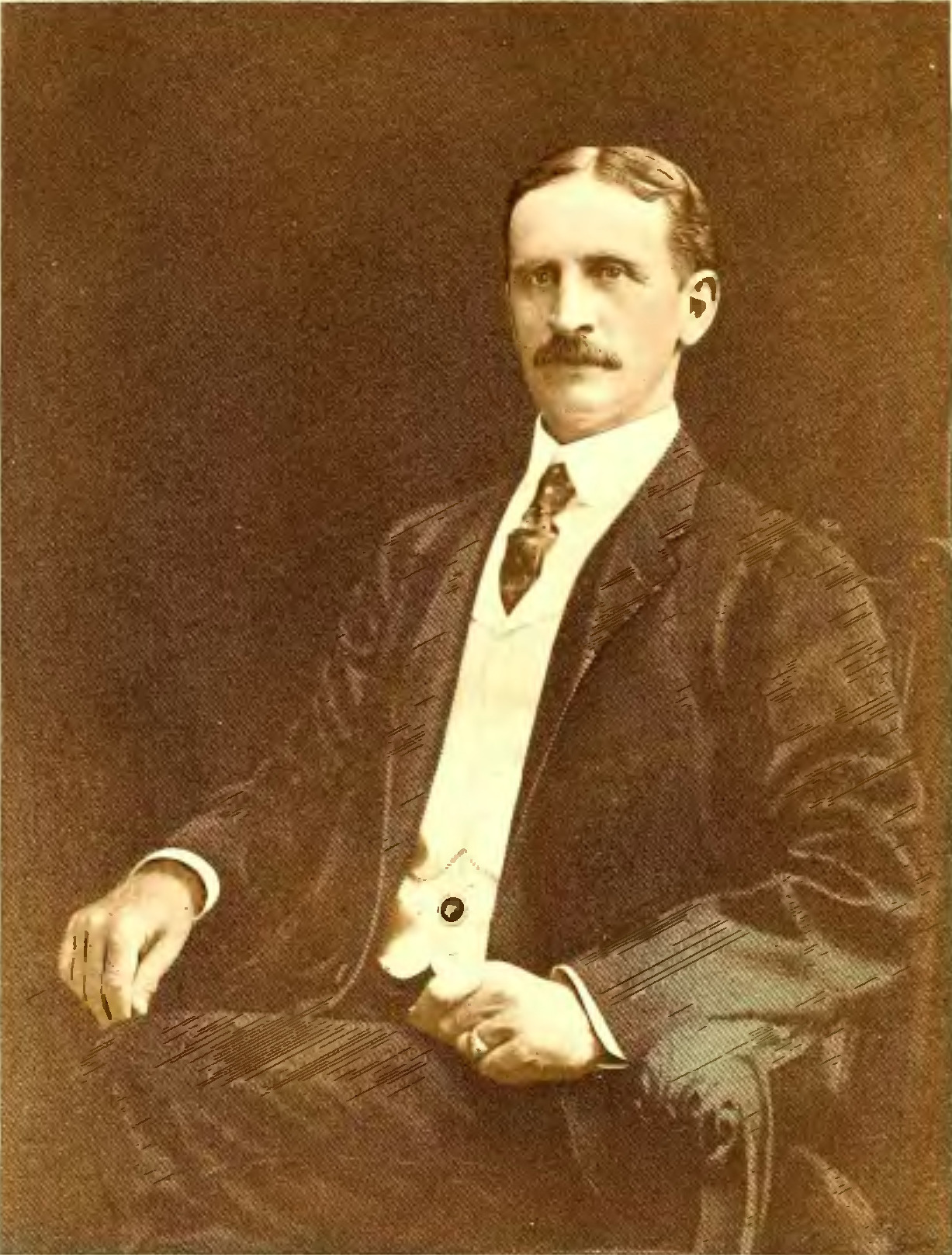
- Born: August 18, 1851; Cumberland, Maryland
- Died: March 7, 1921 (aged 69); Durham, North Carolina
- Resting place: Maplewood Cemetery
- Education: University of Maryland (1871)
- Occupations: Banker, Manufacturer, Philanthropist
- Organization(s): Home Savings Bank (co-founder); Durham Loan & Trust Company (co-founder); Home Security Life Insurance Company (co-founder); Erwin Cotton Mills
- Spouse(s): Laura Valinda Beall (1875-1915); Sara Virginia Ecker (1917-1921)
- Children: Annie Louise Watts
- Parent(s): Gerard Snowden Watts and Ann Elizabeth Wolvington
- Relatives: George Watts Carr (nephew)

George Washington Watts (18 August 1851 – 7 March 1921) was an American manufacturer, financier and philanthropist. Alongside James B. Duke, he co-founded the American Tobacco Company. He also founded Watts Hospital, which was the first hospital in Durham, North Carolina, and prompted the establishment of Duke University.

== Biography ==
Born in Cumberland, Maryland, George W. Watts was the son of Gerard Snowden Watts and Ann Elizabeth Wolvington. He received his early education in private schools in Baltimore, and graduated from the University of Maryland in 1871 with a degree in civil engineering. He was a devout Presbyterian and early member of First Presbyterian Church. He helped establish the congregation at Trinity Avenue Presbyterian Church for workers at one of his cotton mills.

Watts married Laura Valinda Beall in 1875. The two had one child together, Annie Louise Watts, before separating in 1915. Two years later, he married Sara Virginia Ecker, whom he stayed with until his death in 1921.

After graduation, Watts joined his father's tobacco commission business in Baltimore. Becoming associated with Washington Duke of Durham, North Carolina in 1878, he helped organize and incorporate W. Duke Sons and Company, a tobacco business of which he became a stockholder, secretary, and treasurer. However, being the only non-family member in the company created some animosity between Watts and the oldest Duke son, Brodie. This resentment resulted in Brodie purchasing multiple streets in Durham, North Carolina, and naming them so they read "Washington, Hated, Watts," referring to his father, Washington Duke. Years later, "Hated St." was changed to "Gregson St." In 1890, Watts helped organize the American Tobacco Co. and in 1892, the Erwin Cotton Mills Company. Invested in the welfare of his employees, Watts built libraries, parks, and playgrounds for them. He also built and endowed Watts Hospital in Durham, North Carolina. He built a large mansion in Durham called Harwood Hall.

Watts was heavily involved in other businesses as well, as listed below:

- President: Pearl Cotton Mill, Home Savings Bank and Trust (co-founder), Commonwealth Club of Durham
- Vice-President: Locke Cotton Mill
- Director: Seaboard Air Line, Durham and Southern Railway Company, Virginia-Carolina Chemical Company, Southern Cotton Oil Company, Fidelity Bank, Durham Loan & Trust Company (co-founded with his son-in-law John Sprunt Hill)

== Watts Hospital Legacy ==
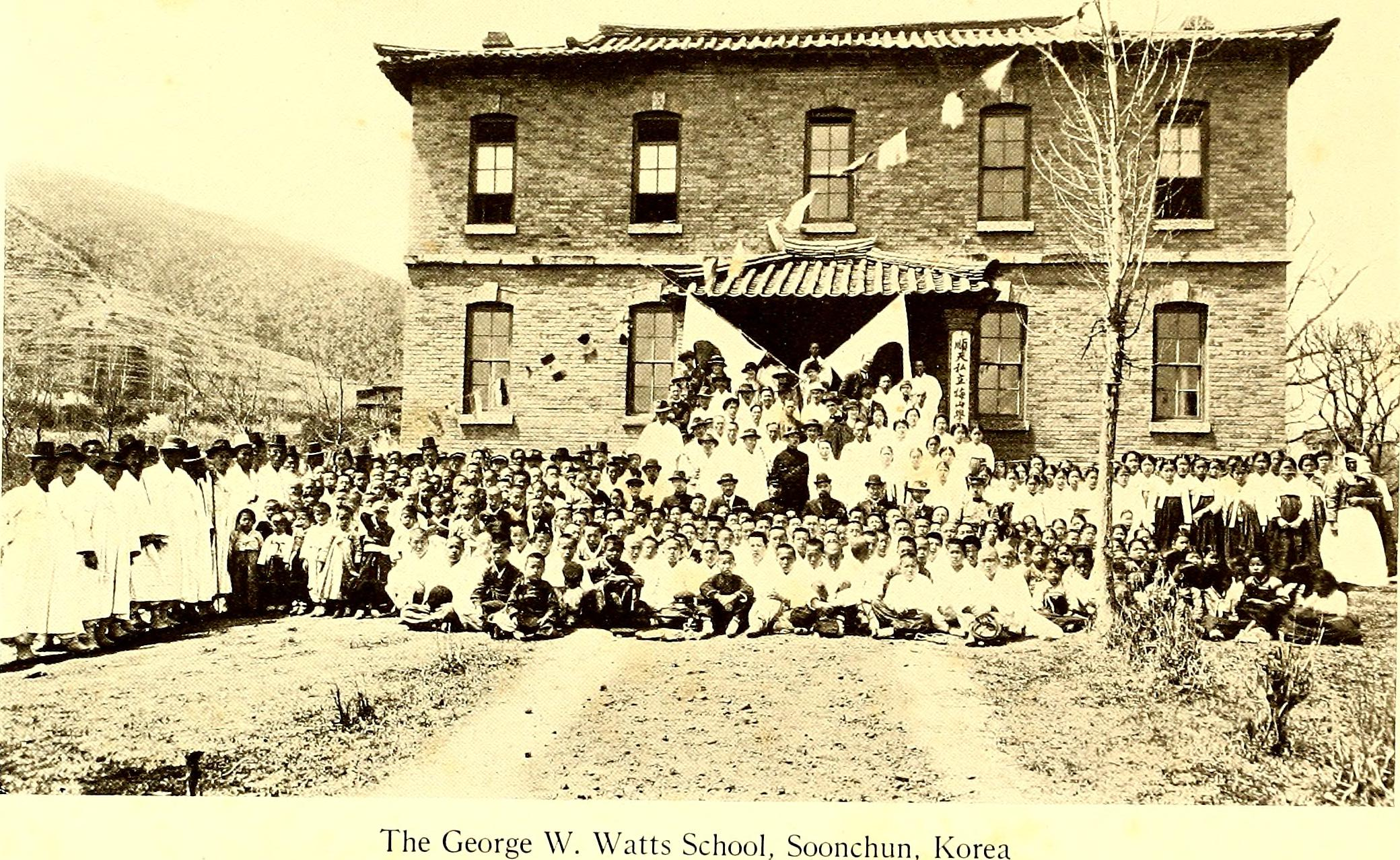
The George W. Watts School, Soonchun, Korea (In memoriam, George Washington Watts - born August 18, 1851, died March 7, 1921) by Charles Leonhard Van Noppen.

=== Duke University ===
By 1922, Watts Hospital's quality of care and philanthropic mission to provide healthcare to the working poor was so well-regarded that James B. Duke and North Carolina Governor Cameron Morrison proposed the creation of the state's first four-year medical college, Duke University. The goal was to educate students in conjunction with clinical services provided at Watts Hospital.

=== Watts School of Nursing ===
In addition to founding the clinical hospital, George Watts also established the Watts Hospital Training School for Nurses at the hospital, in 1895. It was then renamed the Watts School of Nursing (Watts SON), and had its first graduate, Ethel Clay, in 1897. Watts SON has been housed at Durham Regional Hospital since 1976, and is now a part of the Duke University Health System.
