= Silent Vigil at Duke University =

Social protest in the United States of America

Immediately following the assassination of Martin Luther King Jr., the Silent Vigil (also shortened to the Vigil) was a social protest at Duke University that not only demanded collective bargaining rights for AFSCME Local 77, the labor union for nonacademic employees, but also advocated against racial discrimination on campus and in the surrounding community of Durham, North Carolina. Occurring from April 4, 1968, to April 12, 1968, members of the University Christian Movement began planning a campus-wide vigil in memoriam of Dr. King. Another group of undergraduate students called for a protest march to address prevalent issues concerning the primarily African-American nonacademic employees at Duke in Local 77. Together, both student groups, along with the support of Local 77, most of the teaching faculty, and civilians not affiliated with the university, sparked a non-violent demonstration that involved over 2,000 participants, making it the largest in Duke's history. The Silent Vigil stands out from other contemporary college movements due to the collaboration between primarily white students and faculty, and mainly African-American workers. Furthermore, unlike rowdier protests at the University of California, Berkeley and Columbia University, Duke's Silent Vigil received considerable praise for its peaceful approach, especially considering its surrounding Southern backdrop. Inspired by the Civil Rights Movement, the Silent Vigil not only aimed to externally change Duke's white, privileged, and apathetic image in the eyes of the Durham community, but also internally set a powerful precedent on Duke's campus for student activism in the future.

== Background and motivation ==
On November 13, 1964, Martin Luther King Jr. delivered a speech about the Civil Rights Movement at Duke University, declaring that "[Human progress] comes through the tireless efforts and the persistent work of dedicated individuals who are willing to be coworkers with God...The time is always right to do what is right." So many white and black students, faculty, workers, and administrators showed up that campus organizers had to put the speech on loudspeakers so that the overflow audience could listen outside on the Main Quad. Inviting the leader of the Civil Rights Movement to speak marked the university's progress in terms of race relations. Until 1961, Duke had been a university solely for white students; the only black people on campus were the nonacademic workers who served students and faculty. King came during a time when Duke was starting to take part in the activism that had already taken place at many of its contemporary institutions in the North and West. In 1961, three years prior to the Reverend's speech at Duke University, the university's graduate schools had finally desegregated according to a vote by the board of trustees; one year later, five African-American undergraduates matriculated at Duke. In 1966, Samuel DuBois Cook became the first tenured black faculty member, while an undergraduate group called the Afro-American Society was unofficially established to advocate for the rights of black students. Around that same time, African-American nonacademic workers had begun to come together through AFSCME Local 77, an unrecognized union, to picket for better working conditions.

Still, despite making racial progress in terms of bringing African-American students and faculty to Duke, several problems remained: namely, the university's relationship with its African-American nonacademic workers, and a prevalent sense of racist attitudes among Duke's administration. For example, workers were required to address white undergraduates as 'Mister' and 'Miss', clean the bedrooms of the male students (because female students supposedly did not need domestic help), and eat their meals in the kitchen rather than the dining hall. However, the most grievous issues the university administration neglected to address were the lack of a formally recognized union for workers as well as the meager wage the school was paying its nonacademic staff. In the 1960s, colleges and universities were exempt from the federal minimum wage of $1.60. This gave Duke leeway to pay its employees well under the recommended, $1.60 minimum salary; in fact, some Duke workers reported to earning less than a $1.15 minimum salary. In 1965, Oliver Harvey, a black janitor at Duke, organized the Duke Employees Benevolent Society (DEBS) to advocate for higher pay, improved conditions, and nicer benefits. DEBS became Local 77 of the American Federation of State, County, and Municipal Employees, affiliated with AFL-CIO. However, the university administration still chose not to recognize Local 77 as a union or grant collective bargaining rights to its workers. While past Duke students ignored these problems, they were not to be overlooked by the students in the 1960s, many of whom grew up alongside the Civil Rights Movement. Martin Luther King inspired many students when he spoke of the national shift towards racial equality, proclaiming, "And so I can still sing as we sing in our movement, all over the South and all over the nation, 'We Shall Overcome!'" Later, during the Silent Vigil, participants would join hands to sing "We Shall Overcome" as a tribute to the Reverend and his legacy in the Civil Rights Movement.

== The vigil ==
On Friday, April 5, 1968, the vigil began in front of the Duke Chapel on West Campus at noon. Three hours later, around 450 students and faculty marched through the rain to Duke President Douglas Knight's official residence. Those protestors would remain in Knight's house for the next several days. Saturday afternoon, they were joined by another group of about 350 faculty, workers, and students from Duke and North Carolina College, a black university. Later that evening, after multiple discussions with the students that lasted several hours, an exhausted President Knight was removed from all negotiations by his doctor due to fears of stress-related medical complications from his previous case of hepatitis. Acknowledging Knight's illness, the protestors moved back to West Campus' main quad on Sunday morning. Later that night, dining hall and custodial workers at Duke declared an official strike for the upcoming days. Protestors supported the strike and continued the Vigil on the main quad, camping out day and night, while boycotting classes and the dining hall. As more and more students joined the Vigil, professors helped them (and their grades) by holding their own classes on the quad. Several days into the process of participants finding spaces and sitting with their resolve to support changes in the school's policies, folk singers Joan Baez and her friend Pete Seeger appeared and stayed several days leading the group with their inventory of civil rights and union organizing songs.

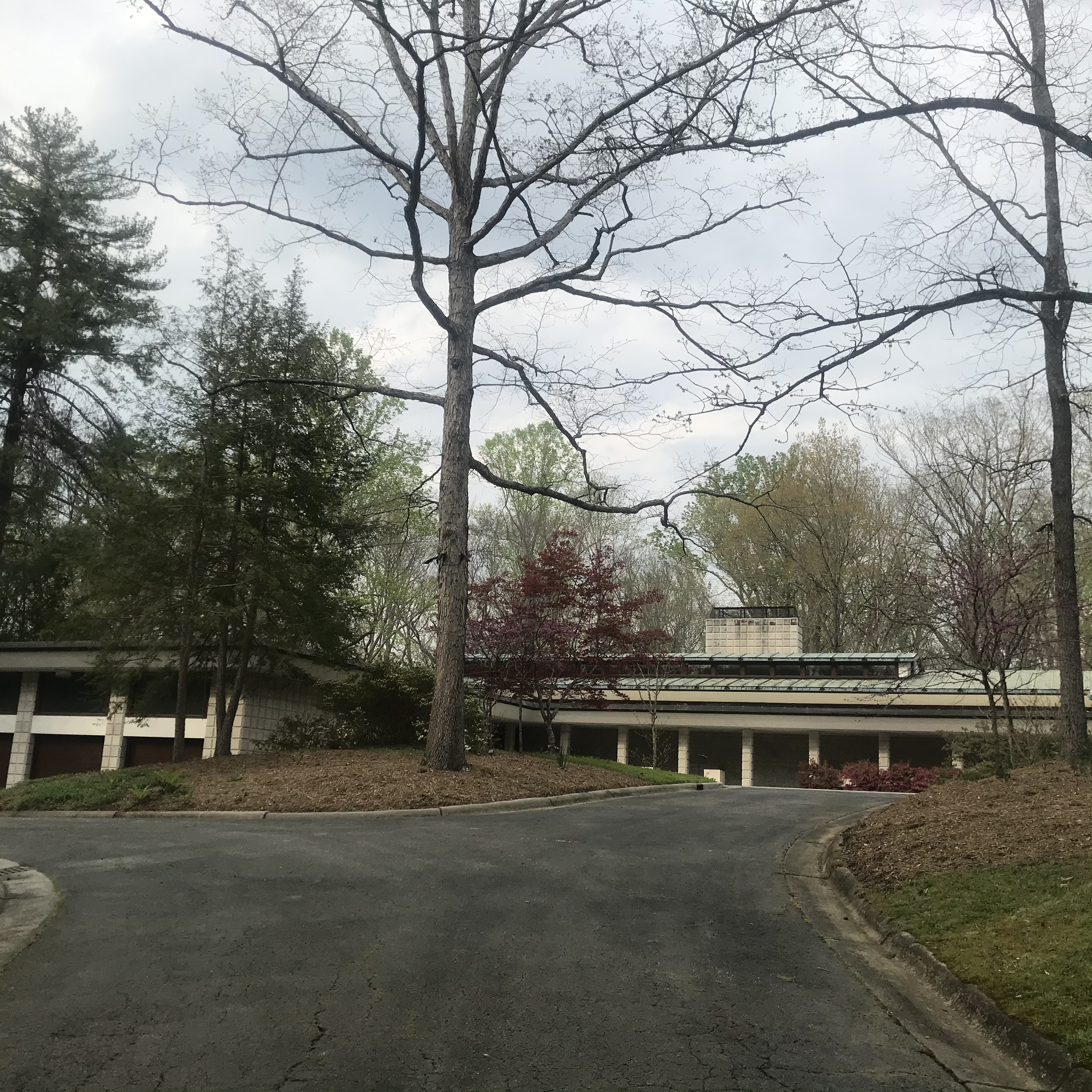
Knight's home, where students marched as part of the vigil.

== The protestors ==
=== Vigil leadership and support ===
The Silent Vigil was led by a committee of ten. (All names are listed alphabetically.) The original negotiating team comprised Dave Birkhead (editor of the Duke Chronicle student newspaper), Huck Guttman, Jon Kinney (president of the student body), Margaret (Bunny) Small, and Asst. Prof. John Strange (Duke political science department), negotiating with Dean of Students William Griffiths. Once the Vigil began in earnest at the Douglas M. and Grace Knight House, the home of Duke University President Douglas Knight, Kinney, Small, and Strange were joined by six undergraduates and one faculty member: Dave Birkhead rejoined, and Jack Boger, David Henderson, Reid Kramer, Alan Ray, Prof. Tom Rainey, and James (Jeff) van Pelt were added, a total of eight undergraduates and two faculty members. Bertie Howard, an African American student advisor to the leadership, challenged the leaders to conduct an orderly vigil, leading to the idea of the Silent Vigil. Members of the University Christian Movement instrumental in planning the accompanying protest march, included the Rev. Helen G. Crotwell, Chris Dame, Jim Davis, Tom Garrison, the Rev. Elmer Hall, Tami Hultman, John Kernodle, the Rev. Nancy Richardson, and George Vlasits. Other principal faculty supporters of the Vigil included Prof. Jim Garrison (History), Prof. Jim Hart (political science), and Prof. Fred Krantz (history). Over the time of the Silent Vigil nearly the entire Duke student body and a significant portion of the faculty participated, as well as students from neighboring universities. The majority of the Duke students who participated were white, as was the student body. More than three-quarters of the protesters had never participated in any demonstration before. The Associated Students of Duke University (ASDU), Duke's student government, showed its support by postponing elections so students could focus on the demonstration. Also, Duke's Interfraternity Council (IFC), the Duke Law School, and the Duke Divinity School formerly endorsed the Silent Vigil.

=== Local 77 ===
AFSCME Local 77, the union for Duke's nonacademic employees, stemmed from its unsuccessful predecessor, the Duke Employees Benevolent Society (created in 1965), which was formed for a number of Duke service employees to protect workers from unfair conditions and obtain wage increases. The majority of the members were African-American and were not only angered by the blatant racial discrimination they faced, but also their salary, which was significantly lower than the national $1.60/hour federal minimum wage.

Due to Duke's unilateral policy making, the voices of the nonacademic employees were not considered. Thus, collective bargaining, a set of procedures that aims to increase equitability between labor and management, was the only remaining option for university workers to receive fair treatment. After realizing the need for collective bargaining in order to improve conditions, Local 77 affiliated with the American Federation of State, County, and Municipal Employees (AFSCME) and AFL-CIO. However, in the fall of 1967, Local 77, AFSCME, and AFL-CIO disbanded. Duke employees reorganized as the United Public and Service Employees Local 77, which was independent and non-affiliated. Local 77 was committed to nonviolence, advocating its demands through peaceful rallies, strikes, and picket lines. It demonstrated such a mindset when its employees went on a strike that ran parallel to the Vigil.

Unfortunately, Duke's administration did not recognize Local 77 in the beginning, stating that it could protect the welfare of its workers better than any union. However, the administration did not stay true to its word and continued to ignore the harassment of its nonacademic employees. In response to its workers being neglected and unfairly treated, Local 77 began to take more action by filing multiple grievances and writing to The Chronicle. In the spring of 1967, union members began picketing outside of Duke's administrative building as well as its medical center. While the school administration was extremely slow on resolving the issues, Duke students and faculty began to take note. The increased student and faculty awareness of the plight of nonacademic workers as well as their protesting efforts led to the Silent Vigil.

== The demands ==
In the beginning of the Silent Vigil, the students presented four demands for Duke administration to consider: one, the placement of an advertisement in the Durham Morning Herald calling for a day of mourning for Dr. King; two, a $1.60 minimum wage for all Duke employees be established; three, that Duke President Douglas Knight resign from his membership in the Hope Valley Country Club; and four, the appointment of a committee to design a method of collective bargaining for workers. Later, over the course of the demonstration, two more demands were added: the creation of an exchange program with North Carolina College; and increased presence of African-American professors.

=== Public condolences in the Durham Morning Herald ===
The Durham Morning Herald was the local paper that began publication in 1893. After merging with The Durham Sun, it is now called The Herald-Sun. At the time of the Silent Vigil, The Durham Morning Herald was regarded as the primary local news source. Duke students believed that the printing of a statement by President Knight saying, "'We are all implicated' in the assassination of King" would serve as a powerful symbol that Durham as a whole was moving forward in racial acceptance.

=== Raising the minimum wage ===
At the time, the federal minimum wage was set at $1.60. The minimum wage for colleges and universities was $1.15. However, Duke paid many of its employees far less. Many considered the discrepancy to be a byproduct of racial prejudice, as most of the nonacademic employees at Duke were African-American. The implication of discrimination angered workers and students at Duke, leading them to protest for change.

=== Boycotting Hope Valley Country Club ===
Situated between Durham and Chapel Hill, Hope Valley Country Club was founded in 1926. In A Journal of the Duke Vigil, David M. Henderson recalls how Hope Valley was a heavily discriminatory "symbol of wealthy white dominance," only allowing white members to take advantage of its facilities. Many Duke administrators were patrons at the Hope Valley Country Club. As the Civil Rights Movement progressed, their Hope Valley membership irked more and more students, who criticized the racial discrimination practiced by the country club. President Knight stated that "he would work to change the rules of the club, and that if he had not accomplished anything in 18 months, he would resign."

=== Appointment of a committee to implement collective bargaining ===
As Duke's administration was a very bureaucratic institution, students and employers realized that the most effective way to implement policy change on Duke's campus was to create a committee to analyze and plan collective bargaining for Local 77 workers. This committee would not only survey the relationship between Duke's employees and the administration, but also draft out an executive proposal to introduce collective bargaining to Duke's campus.

=== Access to Duke University for North Carolina College students ===
In the 1960s, North Carolina College, now known as North Carolina Central University, was a private institution for African-American students. Today, while its students are still primarily black, it is open to all races. Up into the early 1960s, Duke's premier educational resources were only allowed for white students. Finally on March 8, 1961, Duke's board of trustees voted to allow black students to matriculate into the university. The following year, four African-American graduate students enrolled at Duke. In 1963, five African-American undergraduates enrolled. However, although Duke's administration was making gradual policy changes in accordance with the Civil Rights Movement, Duke students were bothered with the fact that the majority of black college students still did not have access to the level of educational resources that Duke offered. Since North Carolina College had not yet attained the academic status that Duke had because it was still a relatively young university, Duke students wanted to reach out to North Carolina College students to give them an opportunity to utilize Duke resources.

=== More African Americans on faculty ===
Duke University's faculty was largely white. During the time preceding the Vigil, only a few Duke faculty members were African-American. The Afro-American Society had been requesting, without success, that the African-American Studies Department be established in the curriculum for about a year prior to the Vigil. Other students on campus recognized the racial unbalance in the makeup of the Duke faculty as well.

== The aftermath ==
=== Short-term effects ===
On Friday, April 12, 1968, about 2,000 students moved off the main quad, declaring an end to the Silent Vigil. Four days later, the nonacademic employee strike ended when the board of trustees announced its intended appointment of the Special Trustee-Administrative Committee, which would be responsible for studying the relationship between the university and its workers and make appropriate policy recommendations. However, the campus movement against university discrimination was far from over; students, faculty, and workers eagerly awaited the decisions of Duke's administration. Eventually, Duke's board of trustees heeded one of the students' requests and created the Special Trustee-Administration Committee, which was responsible for surveying the current standing of Local 77 employees and deciding on a proper tactic to address the problems. On April 20, 1968, the committee released a statement saying, "We will be at the $1.60 minimum hourly rate [for all nonacademic employees] by July 1, 1969." As for President Knight, he did end up resigning from Hope Valley Country Club. In 1992, Hope Valley admitted its first black member. However, Knight did not write the advertisement in the Durham Morning Herald showing condolences for Martin Luther King's death. As for increased faculty diversity, Duke began hiring more and more black professors within the decade following the Silent Vigil, including professor of psychiatry, James Carter, and professor of pediatrics, Brenda Armstrong.

=== Long-term impacts ===
The Silent Vigil played a huge role in redefining Duke's external image within the Durham African-American community as well as setting an important internal precedent for student activism down the line. Even though "stories about the 'Silent Vigil' were not carried in newspapers across the country," the demonstration attempted to show "to Black America that White America still cares and still acts with deeds not words." Professor Samuel Dubois Cook stated to the Vigil participants, "I and other Negroes can go on hoping and believing in the promise of America; we can go on believing that we are going to be free someday because of people like you and all other members of this magnificent vigil." Furthermore, the Silent Vigil set a new standard for student activism on campus. As Professor John Cell noted, "The image Duke had of itself and the kind of people who were in positions of power changed." It showed students, black and white alike, that administrative change, even in a Southern university, could be implemented and initiated by the students and for the students. As University Archivist, William E. King, notes, "[The Silent Vigil's] greatest significance lay in the choice it delineated for those living in the tumultuous year of 1968. The old order clearly was changing. Did one react by supporting traditional values and the status quo or did one grasp at growth and change." Such a difference in reacting to campus inequalities was demonstrated by the Allen Building Takeover in 1969, when students in the Afro-American Society took control of Duke's main administrative building to advocate for their rights as students. The criticism from alumni and trustees resulting from the buildup of student-administration conflict eventually caused President Douglas Knight to resign.

== Reactions to the Silent Vigil ==
Reactions to the Silent Vigil were mixed, largely due to interesting demographic differences. Many students believed that the Vigil was necessary and crucial in bringing about change on campus. According to a poll of the dorms on West Campus, many of the students were in favor of demands listed by the leaders of the Silent Vigil.

As for the nonacademic workers in Local 77, many of them were grateful towards the support shown by the student protestors. In fact, the employees who went on strike stated that they were "inspired by the commitment and determination students have shown in their fight – at a time when many black people have lost their faith that poverty and exploitation can be eliminated and that the white majority really cares."

Meanwhile, the older population looked at the Silent Vigil with more skepticism. Professor John Cell also notes that "There was a real generational divide." Because many older people were involved with Duke's administration, President Knight definitely had a tough time appealing to two very different constituencies – his students and his coworkers. Knight recalls, "I had to fight against some pretty reactionary opinions among senior administrators who felt that we should pay [those employees] as little as we could, using appalling language and so forth. There were a great many members of the Duke constituency who didn't care whether Martin Luther King lived or died; they felt he was disruptive…I was much younger than my peers…I was a prisoner." Among professors, the reaction towards the Vigil varied quite a bit. According to Professor John Cell, "Because of the Vigil, the history department split and it was extremely bitter for about three or four years, in some cases longer than that. That was typical of so many departments, especially in the social sciences and humanities." However, the faculty involved in the Academic Council did release a statement saying "it was appropriate that the faculty should examine [the relationship between the University and its nonacademic employees] for two reasons (1) our own welfare is related to the welfare of the nonacademic employees to the extent that our salaries and theirs do eventually come from the same funds, and (2) in terms of conscience we should be concerned with the distress of other members of the University community."

== Criticism and praise ==
Like any other major historical event, the Silent Vigil received its fair share of criticism and praise. Most criticisms of the Vigil pointed towards the protestors' choice to remain at President Knight's house for an extended period of time. Mary D.B.T. Semans, a University Trustee during the Vigil, stated, "I have always felt, however, that the occupation of President Knight's house was in error and took away from the 'purity' of the cause. It was a violation of his rights." Others, like student Christopher Edgar, criticized the Vigil's motives, saying that "Certainly, the university had a duty to its employees as well…[but] the welfare of the student body at large should come first." He asserted that the university had a priority to make education affordable by its students; increasing the wage for nonacademic workers would only serve to make Duke's tuition more expensive. Another criticism of Silent Vigil was directed towards its lack of thematic coherency, as there seemingly was no connection between the assassination of Dr. King and the strike by the employees.

The Silent Vigil received praise for its nonviolent approach, which was quite different from contemporary riots at the University of California Berkeley or Columbia University. The difference in protest style was largely correlated to geographical factors, as Berkeley and Columbia were in the more liberal regions of the West and North, respectively, while Duke was in the South. Southern Student Organizing Committee (SSOC) organizer Sue Thrasher pointed out, "People [in the South] knew they didn't have the numbers. On southern campuses [in the mid-1960s] people were well aware that they were a minority…speaking out. And so your tactics had to be a little bit more moderated. And so you had to think about safety and sustaining yourself over time." William Griffith, the assistant to the provost for student affairs at the time of the demonstration, noted, "it's a lot easier to do physical violence to something because you're responding to your emotions and you get immediate gratification. And [the Silent Vigil] was slow gratification, and it took discipline to do that. I have a great deal of respect for the leadership that made it happen that way. It really was special to Duke and to higher education; nothing like it happened anywhere else in the country."
