= Wayne Manor (Duke University) =

American college social group

- WM
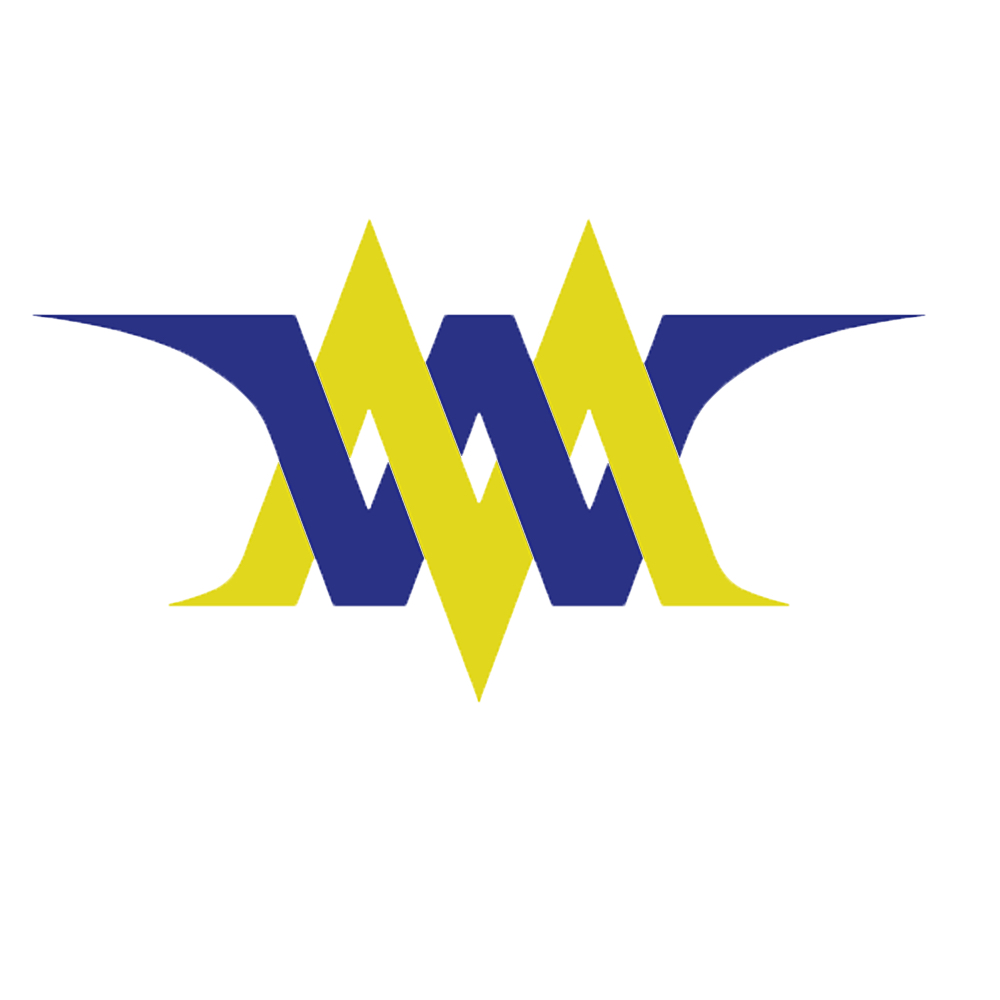
- Founded: 1981; 45 years ago Duke University
- Type: Student society
- Affiliation: Independent
- Status: Active
- Scope: Local
- Chapters: 1
- Nickname: Wayne
- Former name: Bunch of Guys (BOG)
- Headquarters: Durham, North Carolina; United States
- Website: waynemanor.org

The Wayne Manor (WM) is an all-male selective living group (SLG) at Duke University in Durham, North Carolina. The organization is known informally as Wayne, and its members are known as Men of the Manor or Manorites. It formed as a non-Greek alternative to fraternity life in 1981.

== History ==
=== BOG ===
Wayne Manor originated in 1981 as the Bunch of Guys (BOG) or BOGgers, an all-male independent living group in Building HH, Few Quad of Duke University. The Duke University Judiciary Committee disbanded the group in 1992 for alcohol violations. BOG was commemorated as a space on the vintage Duke-themed Monopoly game, Dukeopoly.

=== Wayne Manor ===
After BOG's dissolution, its former members established Wayne Manor in Wannamaker Dormitory on Duke University's West Campus. Its name referenced the home of Bruce Wayne, Batman’s alter ego. The organization began as a Commitment House, meaning only one-third of its members were selected for membership and the rest joined via a lottery. Wayne Manor become a Selective Living Group (SLG) in 1992.

Wayne Manor emerged as an alternative to fraternity life at Duke University, prioritizing both social engagement and community service without requiring mandatory pledging. It selects members irrespective of race, religion, socioeconomic status, or sexual orientation.

The organization emphasizes personal growth, engagement in community service projects, fostering faculty interaction, and organizing social events such as mixers, formal dances, and campus-wide parties. Its Malt Liquor Thursdays (M.L.T.) has been a campus-wide event since 1994. In the early 2000s, Wayne Manor was known for hosting a weekly poker game with a $100 buy-in.

In 2007, some Duke students expressed discontent with the selective-living model because it allowed organizations like Wayne Manor to dominate a dorm's living spaces. To create a more inclusive experience, Duke University banned the recruitment of first-year students by Greek fraternities and non-Greek selective living groups, including Wayne Manor, in 2021. In response, all fraternities at Duke disaffiliated from the Duke Interfraternity Council in favor of the Durham Interfraternity Council.

Soon after, Duke University announced the discontinuation of on-campus housing for SLGs after the 2023–2024 academic year. While many SLGs transitioned to a Living-Learning Community model to retain on-campus housing, Wayne Manor remained an SLG and relocated to off-campus accommodations. Despite disaffiliating from Duke, Wayne Manor continues to participate in mandatory pre-rush training conducted by student-led groups, Duke Sexual Harassment and Assault Prevention and Education (SHAPE) and Duke Sexual Assault Prevention Team (SAPT).

== Community service ==
Duke University requires SLGs such as Wayne Manor to engage in community service. Some of the group's members volunteer with Meals on Wheels of Durham. Wayne Manor has also partnered with Hillandale Elementary School since 1994. Its members have contributed to the school in various ways, including providing Spanish instruction, organizing and overseeing the chess and science clubs, tutoring in math, leading recess activities, and facilitating art clubs. The group also rebuilt the school's amphitheater and nature trail. Wayne Manor members have received numerous awards for the Hillandale project, including the Group Volunteer Award from the Volunteer Center of Durham, the Lars Lyon Volunteer Service Award from the Duke Community Service Center, and the Most Outstanding Volunteer Award from Durham County.

== Notable members ==
- Jason Strasser, professional poker player and founder of the Caption hedge fund.
