= East Campus =

East Campus may refer to:

- East Campus Neighborhood, in Columbia, Missouri
- East Campus (Duke University)
- East Campus (Columbia University)
- East Campus (Massachusetts Institute of Technology)
- East Campus (Western Michigan University)
- East Campus station, a light rail station under construction in College Park, Maryland
- East Campus of Guru Gobind Singh Indraprastha University, Shahdara, Delhi, India
- Netaji Subhas University of Technology (East Campus), Geeta Colony, Delhi, India
- University of York, Campus East

== See also ==
- West Campus (disambiguation)
