= West Campus =

West Campus may refer to:

- Duke University West Campus, part of Duke University's campus in Durham, North Carolina
- Boston University West Campus, the westernmost part of Boston University's Charles River campus in Boston, Massachusetts
- Arizona State University at the West campus, one of four university campuses that compose Arizona State University
- Cornell West Campus, a residential section of Cornell University's Ithaca, New York campus
- University of Northern Colorado West Campus, a residential section of the University of Northern Colorado
- West Campus, Austin, Texas, United States
- West Campus High School, a public college preparatory magnet high school located in Sacramento, California

== See also ==
- East Campus (disambiguation)
