= J. Deryl Hart House =

Residence of the president of Duke University

Coordinates: 35°59′33″N 78°56′26″W

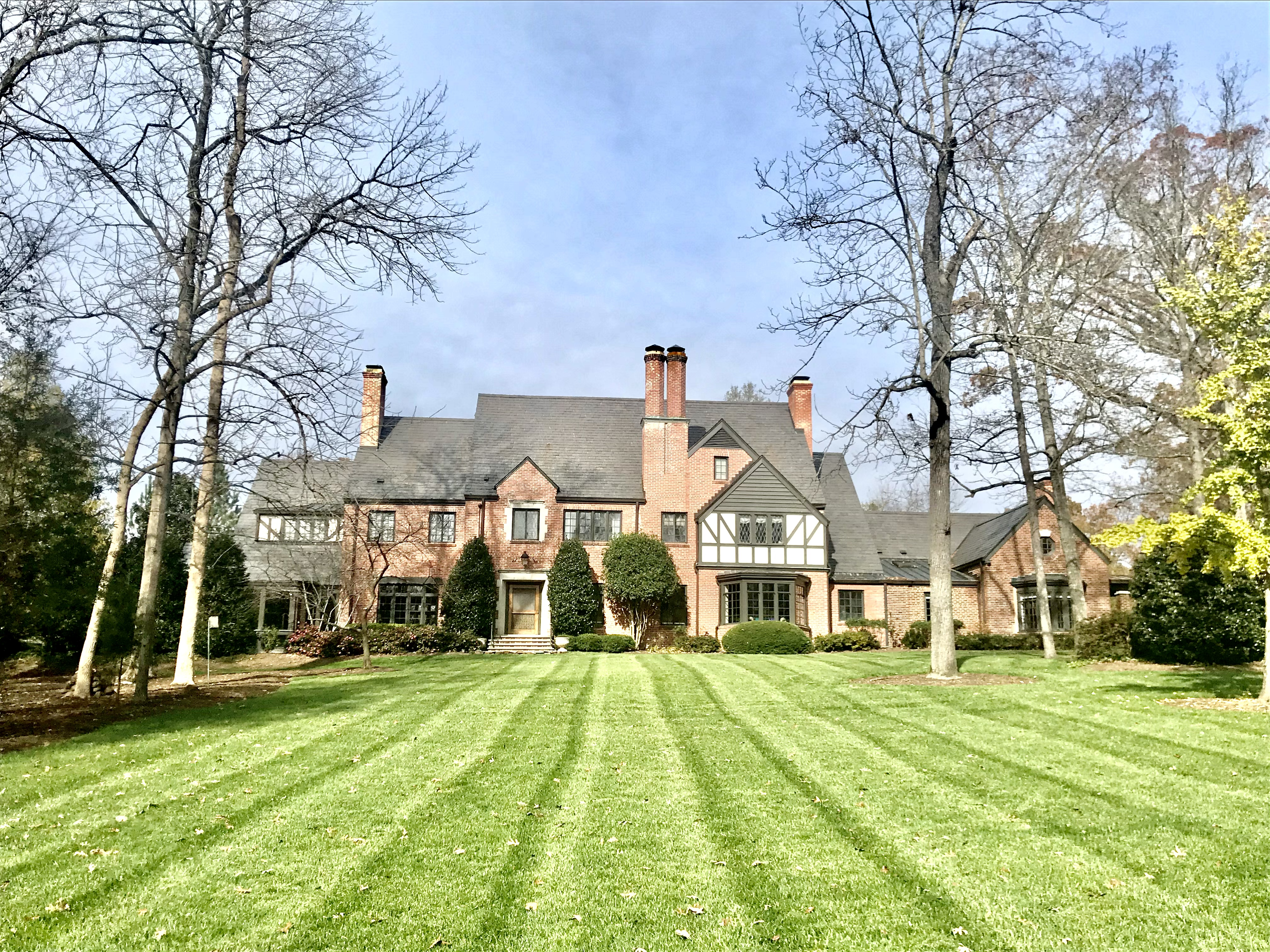
- The house in 2020

General information
- Status: active
- Type: private residence
- Architectural style: Tudor Revival
- Location: 2324 Duke University Road; Durham, North Carolina, U.S.
- Completed: 1934

Design and construction
- Architects: Thomas Wright Cooper; G. Murray Nelson

The J. Deryl Hart House is the official residence for the president of Duke University in Durham, North Carolina. Built between 1933 and 1934 for Julian Deryl Hart, the three-story brick and timber Tudor Revival mansion is located on the university's West Campus, near Wallace Wade Stadium, at the crossroads of Duke University Road and Academy Road.

== History ==
The J. Deryl Hart House was built between 1933 and 1934 on Duke University's West Campus for Julian Deryl Hart, the head of surgery at Duke University Hospital. Hart, who was one of the founding chairmen of Duke University School of Medicine, was appointed University President in 1960, serving in that capacity until 1963. He rented out rooms in the house to medical students. Hart continued to live in the house until his death in 1980. His wife, Mary Hart, continued to live in the house until her death in 2000.

The house, designed by Raleigh architects Thomas Wright Cooper and G. Murray Nelson and constructed by Durham contractor George W Kane, was built in the Tudor Revival style as one of five homes built for Duke faculty members in the initial development of West Campus. Of the five houses, it is the only one built almost entirely out of brick. There is half-timbering on the upper stories of some of the gabled wings of the house, and decorative chimneys with corbelled stacks and octagonal chimney pots. Located at the crossroads of Duke University Road and Academy Road, the home sits near the Wallace Wade Stadium. The first floor of the J. Deryl Hart House includes two kitchens, a formal dining room, a grand foyer, a formal living room, a casual family room, a study, a library, and a sunroom. The master bedroom, which includes a dressing room, large bathroom, and a sleeping porch, is located on the second floor. Aside from the master bedroom, there are four bedrooms as well as an apartment with a kitchenette.

It was renovated in 2004 for university president Richard H. Brodhead, returning the house into the official presidential residence for the first time since the 1960s. In between the terms of Hart and Brodhead, university presidents Terry Sanford, Nannerl O. Keohane, and Douglas Knight lived at Knight House, a guest house and conference facility built in Duke Forest in the 1960s. President H. Keith H. Brodie lived in his own home during his term. Since 2017 it has been the home of university president Vincent Price.
