= Douglas M. and Grace Knight House =

Former residence of Duke University presidents

Coordinates: 35°59′11″N 78°56′33″W

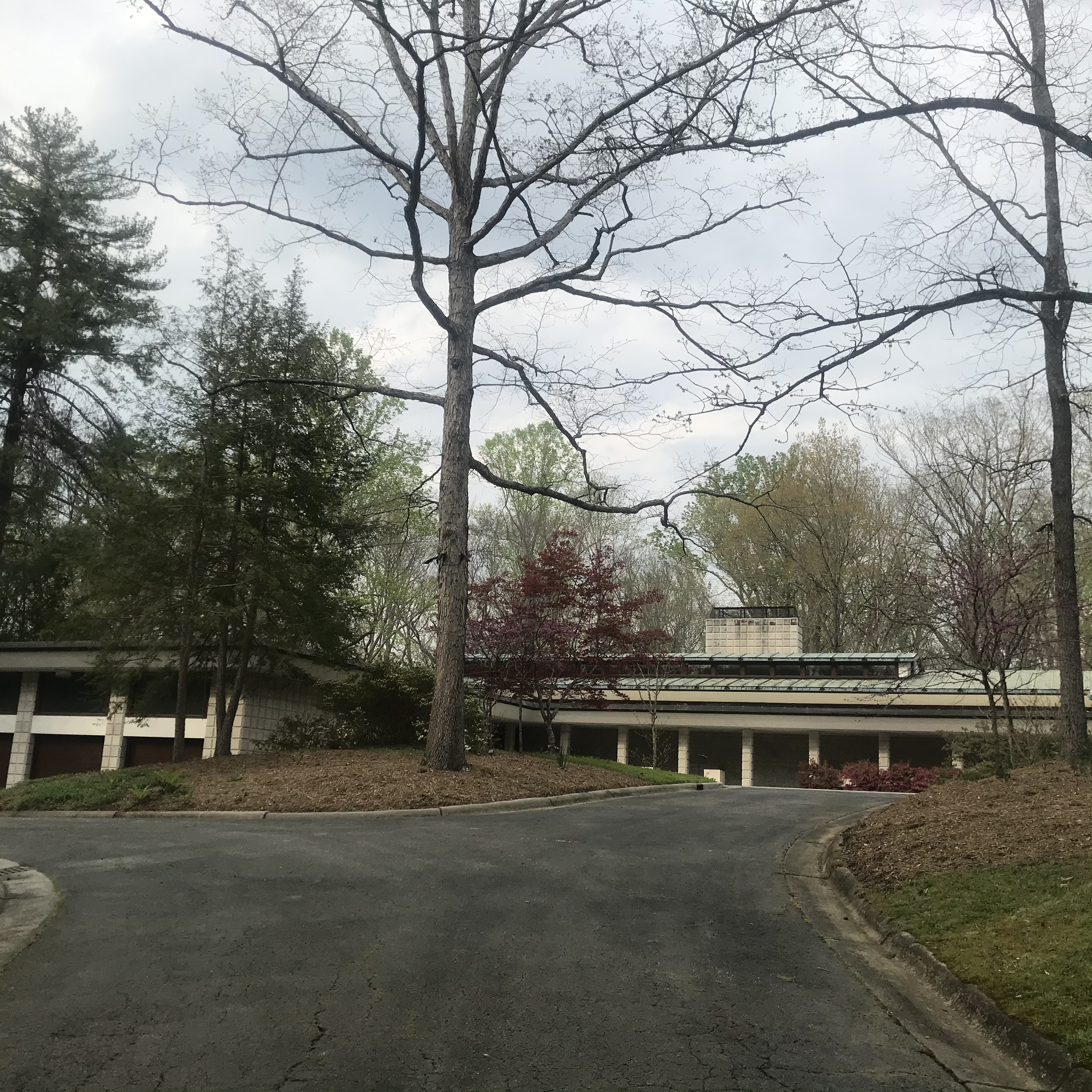
- The Knight House in 2021

General information
- Status: active
- Type: event venue
- Architectural style: Modernist
- Location: 1508 Pinecrest Road; Durham, North Carolina, U.S.
- Completed: 1966
- Owner: Duke University

Design and construction
- Architect: Alden B. Dow

The Douglas M. and Grace Knight House, also known as Knight House, is a Modernist-style mansion in Durham, North Carolina. The house, designed by Alden B. Dow, previously served as the official residence for presidents of Duke University and is now used by the university as an event space, conference facility, and guest house. On April 6, 1968, following the assassination of Martin Luther King Jr., four-hundred and fifty university students marched to the house during the Silent Vigil at Duke University to deliver a list of demands to Duke president Douglas M. Knight. The house, previously called University House, was officially named after Knight and his wife, Grace Nicholas Knight, in 2003.

== History ==
In 1963, University President Douglas Knight commissioned Alden B. Dow to design an official residence. Built in the Modernist style, the home was completed in 1966. The landscaping was designed by Dick Bell, who also designed Pullen Park in Raleigh, North Carolina. The house takes its name from Douglas Knight, who served as president during the construction of the home, and was the first university president to live there. University presidents Terry Sanford and Nannerl O. Keohane also lived at Knight House. Knight House is 10,655 square feet, and cost $379,971 to build. The house is a low-slung home with ribbed copper roof caps. The interior panelling in the house is made from bald cypress.

Located along Academy Road and Pinecrest Road, near the Duke golf course, the house sits on 436 acres in the Duke Forest, near Duke University West Campus. It served as an official residence for university presidents from 1966 until 2004, when the original official residence, the J. Deryl Hart House, was renovated for Richard H. Brodhead. The house is now used as a guest house, conference facility, and event space by the university.

On April 6, 1968 the Silent Vigil at Duke University, a week-long silent demonstration following the Assassination of Martin Luther King Jr., kicked-off with 450 students marching two miles from campus to Knight House to deliver a list of demands to Douglas Knight for a restructuring of Duke University, so that the institution would be less threatening to African-American students and employees. The demands included that Knight publish an advertisement in the Durham Morning Herald calling for a day of mourning for Rev. Dr. Martin Luther King Jr., that he raise the minimum wage to $1.60 for university employees, and that he resign from the then-segregated Hope Valley Country Club. The students also demanded that Knight appoint a committee of students, faculty, and workers to make recommendations concerning collective bargaining and union recognition at Duke. Knight received the students during the protest, and invited them into the house, spending the entire night negotiating the terms of their demands.

On September 15, 2012, the house was featured in Modernism in Duke Forest, a tour of six modernist houses in the Duke Forest neighborhood hosted by Triangle Modernist Houses and the Durham Preservation Society.
