= Helen Gray Crotwell =

American campus minister (1925–2006)

- Born: October 8, 1925; Newberry, South Carolina, U.S.
- Died: April 9, 2006 (aged 65); Cordele, Georgia, U.S.
- Occupation: Clergy
- Parent(s): James Calvin Crotwell and Mary Helen Gray Crotwell

Helen Gray Crotwell (October 8, 1925 – April 9, 2006) served as the Associate Minister to Duke University from 1973 to 1979. She had previously served as the associate director of the Duke Methodist campus ministry. During her time at Duke, she published a compilation of sermons written by women and participated as a campus minister in the Silent Vigil at Duke University. Crotwell was the first woman appointed as a district superintendent in the United Methodist Church in North Carolina and one of the first in the Southeast. She served as the chairperson of the Commission on the Status and Role of Women in the United Methodist North Carolina Conference and advocated for inclusivity and female empowerment in the church. Her major interests included women and the church, women and theology, counseling, and the church and social justice.

== Early life and education ==
Helen Crotwell was born on October 8, 1925, in Newberry, South Carolina, the daughter of James Calvin Crotwell and Mary Helen Gray Crotwell. She grew up in Leesburg, Georgia, where she and her family attended Leesburg Methodist, a small rural church. As a young girl, her early involvement in the church led her to dream about being a minister, even though the Methodist churches did not ordain women at the time.

Crotwell graduated from high school when she was sixteen years old. She went on to the Georgia State College for Women, now known as Georgia College & State University, in Milledgeville. She attended during World War II, from 1941 through 1945. After graduation, Crotwell moved to upstate New York to join the Lisle Fellowship, an intentional Christian community that exposed her to ethnic and racial diversity and cooperation she had not seen in Georgia.

== Early career ==
After leaving Lisle, Crotwell decided to pursue work in the church. Because the Methodist churches did not ordain women at the time, Crotwell obtained a master's degree in religious education from the Candler School of Theology at Emory University.

Upon her graduation from Candler, Crotwell secured a job working in campus ministry in Rock Hill, South Carolina at Winthrop College, at the time a women's college and now the coeducational Winthrop University. There she was director of the Wesley Foundation, the Methodist ministry which served over 300 students. Crotwell found ministry at Winthrop to be dynamic and interesting, and she engaged with her students in discussions linking theology and social justice.

Crotwell still felt called to ordained ministry, a vocation she could not pursue, but her first work experience in campus ministry took her a step closer. Crotwell wrote that she picked campus ministry in part because it was more open to women, saying that “It provided the opportunity to minister and work with people without feeling like I had to be second string." In order to further her career, Crotwell left Winthrop to spend one year at Harvard Divinity School. At Harvard, she took classes with Paul Tillich and Krister Stendahl, whom she later cited as one of her most formative teachers.

After Harvard, Crotwell moved back to New York, where she spent two summers at Union Theological Seminary. Eager to continue her studies, she pursued further education in Europe. She studied with the second order of the Taizé Community in France and studied German at the Goethe-Institut in Germany, and visited the Iona Community in Scotland. Crotwell decided to return to the United States when a friend taking a leave of absence from his position at Duke University asked if she would like to serve as the associate to the Methodist campus minister there. In 1965, Crotwell moved to Durham, North Carolina to serve as associate director of the Wesley Foundation, the Methodist campus ministry.

== Wesley Foundation at Duke University ==
As the associate director of the Wesley Foundation at Duke University, Crotwell became a leader for students eager to become involved in the civil rights movement. Twice she travelled with students to protests in Washington, D.C. After hearing of the assassination of Martin Luther King Jr. on April 4, 1968, nearly five hundred Duke students marched to President Douglas Knight’s house. Faculty members joined in, and President Knight invited the crowd into his home. Students called for a campus minister, and so Crotwell joined the sit-in. She stayed the night, sleeping on a landing at the top of a stairwell and offering conversation, counsel, and companionship.

The crowd remained in President Knight’s residence for two days and then marched to the main Duke quadrangle in front of Duke Chapel. The action, later known as the Silent Vigil at Duke University, was one of the earliest of the mass student protests that emerged around the world in the weeks following King’s assassination. In a matter of days, the demonstrators’ numbers grew to two thousand, nearly half of the undergraduate student body. Students occupied the quad around the clock, bringing the university to a near standstill. They protested university injustices as well as national ones; students pushed for living wages and university recognition of an employee labor union.

Crotwell was a faithful presence at the vigil, offering solidarity to students grappling with the pain of their era. Tamela Hultman, one of the student leaders of the silent vigil, recalled, “Among our most stalwart supporters were campus ministers like Helen Crotwell, whose apartment in the Methodist Student Center had always been a place of nurture and refuge, while she herself was a role model, especially for women students.” The vigil lasted from April 5 to 11, 1968, and resulted in Duke’s recognition of a nonacademic employees’ union and a raise in worker’s salaries.

Crotwell was also involved in student action around the Vietnam War. She and her students offered food to activists protesting the war and supervised the burning of draft cards in the basement of their campus ministry. In 1969, along with other religious leaders on campus, she signed a statement, published in the Duke Chronicle, calling for an end to the Vietnam War. She signed a statement written by Duke's Religious Life Council recommending the discontinuation of the university's Reserve Officers' Training Corps (ROTC), arguing that it perpetuated military interests. Crotwell also aided the Christmas Fund Committee at Duke in 1969, which organized funds to purchase gifts for American draft deserters who were living in Canada.

== Ordination ==
After her work with the Wesley Foundation, Crotwell left Duke and moved to St. Mary’s College of Maryland, where she was an administrator in the residential halls. She found the work unfulfilling and decided to pursue ordination, a goal she had harbored even before the ordination of women in the United Methodist Church began in 1956. When she left St. Mary's College, administrators from Duke University asked if she would return to Duke in order to become the associate minister to the university. She moved back to Durham in 1973 and pursued ordination in North Carolina.

In 1973, Crotwell was ordained as a deacon in the United Methodist Church at a time when over ninety percent of the ministers in the North Carolina Conference were men. The title did not necessarily change Crotwell’s understanding of her role in the church; she later explained that people had already accepted her as if she were ordained.

On June 2, 1975, two years after her ordination as a deacon, Crotwell was ordained as an elder alongside another woman, Gladys R. Williford of Raleigh. She and Crotwell were the first two women ordained as elders in the North Carolina Conference of the United Methodist Church, the highest order of ordained ministers in the church.

At the North Carolina Conference, Crotwell used her position as an elder to make gender equality a central concern. She served as the chairperson of the Commission on the Status and Role of Women. During her time on the commission, she worked to prevent what she called a "women’s circuit", a practice in which women clergy are only rotated among the churches that seem comfortable with female pastors. She served as a member of the Board of Ordained Ministry as well, and for the general church served on the Curriculum Resource Commission and General Board of Discipleship. She also served on a revision committee of the United Methodist Hymnal, editing it for more gender-inclusive language.

== Duke Chapel ==
Crotwell was asked to become the associate minister of Duke Chapel in 1973. She accepted the position, which included presiding over worship services in the Chapel once a month, and preaching three times a year. She also served as a member to the advisory board of Friends of Duke Chapel, an organization founded in 1974 for those interested in supporting the ministry and programming of the chapel. At the time of her appointment, she was the only woman on the religious life staff at the chapel.

At Duke, she also worked with the Duke University Parish Ministry, the Sexuality Counseling Center, and various women’s groups. She acted as the advisor to the YM-YWCA, and started women’s theology programs. She supervised a number of service projects at Duke, including an initiative to provide money and fuel to Durham residents who could not afford to heat their homes. Along with teaching classes at the Divinity School, including one called "Women and Ministry," she also counseled students and staff members in the Duke community.

During her time at Duke, Crotwell also published a compilation of sermons written by a diverse group of both ordained and lay women from a variety of political and theological backgrounds. Her compilation, titled Women and the Word, was published by Fortress Press in 1978. She viewed the book as a refutation of the notion that women in ministry are not suited for the pulpit. She wrote that churches that invite female preachers “may well hear the word of God come to them in a new and different way”, but also observed that no major pulpit in the country was at that time filled by a woman. Some of Crotwell's sermons are available for perusal in the Duke Archives.

Crotwell brought her experiences as a female minister to bear in arenas outside the university as well. In August 1977, she was named as a trustee of the Resource Center for Women and Ministry of the South, founded by her close friend Jeanette Stokes, a Presbyterian minister. She spoke at various events outside of Durham as well. For example, in 1977 she presented a lecture at the University of North Carolina at Pembroke titled "What Values Will Have to Change for the American Woman?", and in 1978 she participated in a panel in Chapel Hill, North Carolina, for the American Association of University Women, in which she discussed her experience as a woman in a traditionally male profession. In 1977, Crotwell also served as a principle speaker at a United Methodist conference at the University of San Diego, where she delivered a talk on gender inclusivity in Christian theology.

== Dismissal ==
In October 1978, the Reverend Robert Young, Duke University minister, informed Crotwell that her contract at Duke Chapel would not be renewed. He explained that the university had recently adopted an "unwritten policy in which junior positions are changed regularly to provide new and creative thought." The decision upset faculty and students across the campus. Some felt that Crotwell would not have been dismissed had she been male, and suspected that Young may have felt threatened by her popularity on campus. Crotwell was widely seen as one of the most visible female leaders on campus.

A student group called the “Coalition on Chapel Policy” formed in response and circulated a petition calling for Crotwell’s reinstatement. They were troubled not just by her dismissal, but also the precedent it set. In the Duke student newspaper, Charlotte Dickson, a member of the Coalition on Chapel Policy, wrote, “If women are confined to junior positions which are subject to frequent turnover, their chances of advancing are slim.”

Other groups also acted on Crotwell’s behalf. Members of the Duke Chapel Choir circulated a petition of their own. Female faculty and staff members in a group called “The Women’s Network” partnered with students to petition to have Young reverse his decision and suggest alternate hiring and contractual procedures. They also wrote to several universities to collect information about their associate ministers' contracts. Their efforts prompted Duke's trustees to ask for a plan for a Duke Religious Affairs Council. In response, Duke's president, Terry Sanford, released a statement expressing concern and calling for the creation of an administrative body called the University Council on Religious Life. Young, however, did not revoke the dismissal.

In 1980, as per the recommendation of both the network and President Sanford, the university established the Religious Life Council to advise the chapel minister on policy and personnel decisions. After Crotwell's dismissal, the Religious Life Council remained to improve transparency and accountability in chapel administrative procedure.

James B. Craven III, Duke class of 1967, wrote in the Chronicle on June 18, 1979, that Crotwell's dismissal “Upset just about everybody connected with Duke—men and women, whites and blacks, faculty and students. Helen’s two new churches are to be congratulated, but Duke has suffered a real loss.”

== Later career ==
In June 1979, Crotwell was appointed minister of two rural churches in Granville County, North Carolina: Banks Church, and Grove Hill Church. She preached at both churches each Sunday morning. Under her ministry, church attendance and tithing increased.

At Banks and Grove Hill, Crotwell instituted small changes to make the institutions more inclusive of women. She incorporated gender-inclusive language, sometimes discarding masculine pronouns for God and encouraging her parishioners to use terms like "chairperson" rather than "chairman". In 1983, Crotwell transferred to Wake Forest United Methodist Church in North Carolina, where she served as pastor for three years.

On July 1, 1986, Crotwell was appointed Fayetteville District Superintendent in the United Methodist Church while serving as pastor at the Wake Forest United Methodist Church. She was the first woman to be appointed a United Methodist district superintendent in North Carolina, and one of the first in the Southeast United States.

As the district superintendent, Crotwell focused much of her efforts on small church communities and the church communities of racial and ethnic minorities. Her reputation began to spread. In December 1990, she was honored with an honorary Doctor of Divinity degree by Methodist University in Fayetteville, North Carolina.

In 1992, she was asked to run for the position of bishop by women of the southeastern jurisdiction of the nationwide United Methodist Church governing body. Her candidacy made her the first woman endorsed as a nominee for the episcopacy of the United Methodist Church. Crotwell did not win the election and the bishops remained all-male.

After her term as district superintendent, Crotwell returned to Durham in 1992 and for two years served as pastor to Mt. Bethel, a small congregation just outside Durham.

== Later life ==
In 1994, Crotwell retired from the North Carolina Conference of the United Methodist Church. In order to be close to family, she moved to Cordele, Georgia, where she served as the minister of Wenona United Methodist Church for two years. She moved in with her sister and brother-in-law, Neal and Demp Posey. She died in her home on Palm Sunday, April 9, 2006. Her ministry was highlighted at the United Methodist Annual Conference on June 15, 2006, during the celebration of the 50th anniversary of women’s full ordination in the United Methodist Church.
