= Oliver Harvey (labor organizer) =

American labor leader (died 1987)

John Oliver Harvey (died May 2, 1987) was an African American janitor at Duke University and founding president of the Local 77 chapter of American Federation of State, County, and Municipal Employees, AFL-CIO. He spearheaded the movement to unionize Duke University employees during the 1960s.

== Early life ==
The son of a land-owning farmer, John Oliver Harvey grew up in Franklinton, North Carolina, which was at the time dominated by the textile and tobacco industries. When his father lost his land in 1933, Harvey moved to Durham, North Carolina, to find employment and worked a series of temporary jobs. In 1936, he took a job at the American Tobacco Company, which was in the process of unionizing. Refusing to join the union on account of its policy of segregation, Harvey was soon fired. He subsequently worked as an assistant at Watts Hospital, and in 1943 began a job at the Krueger Bottling Company, which had been hiring African Americans because of the wartime labor shortage, and which had a segregated union. Harvey helped initiate a strike in favor of desegregation, garnering the support of the company's white employees.

== Duke University ==
After a brief stint running his own restaurant, Harvey in 1951 began working as a janitor at Duke University, where he soon began advocating for better wages and treatment of housekeeping staff. In 1956 he made headlines when he and fellow Duke employee Beatrice Noore disobeyed a bus driver's orders to give up their seats to white students and in 1960, he participated in a sit-in with North Carolina College (now North Carolina Central University) students at Rose's downtown department store in Durham. Harvey also met with Martin Luther King Jr. during King's 1964 visit to Duke University.

In 1965, Harvey initiated the formation of the Duke University Employees Benevolent Society; after searching for a national union with which to affiliate, the DUEBS eventually chose the American Federation of State, County, and Municipal Employees, becoming the Local 77 chapter. That year, the DUEBS delivered a petition to Duke President Douglas Knight demanding wage increases and benefits for the Duke housekeeping staff, issues remaining prominent in Duke University politics throughout the 1960s.

In the early 1970s, Harvey was promoted to a supervisory position at Duke. After he retired, he volunteered as an organizer for Duke University Medical Center; in 1978, he took a job with the AFSCME as a labor organizer, also in the DUMC. Eventually he asked to be taken off the AFSCME payroll.

== Personal life ==
Harvey married Louise Sanders. He had one son and two daughters, A. D., Thelma, and Elizabeth. He died on May 2, 1987, aged 80, at his Alston Avenue home in Durham.
