= Duke University East Campus =

Portion of Duke's main campus

East Campus
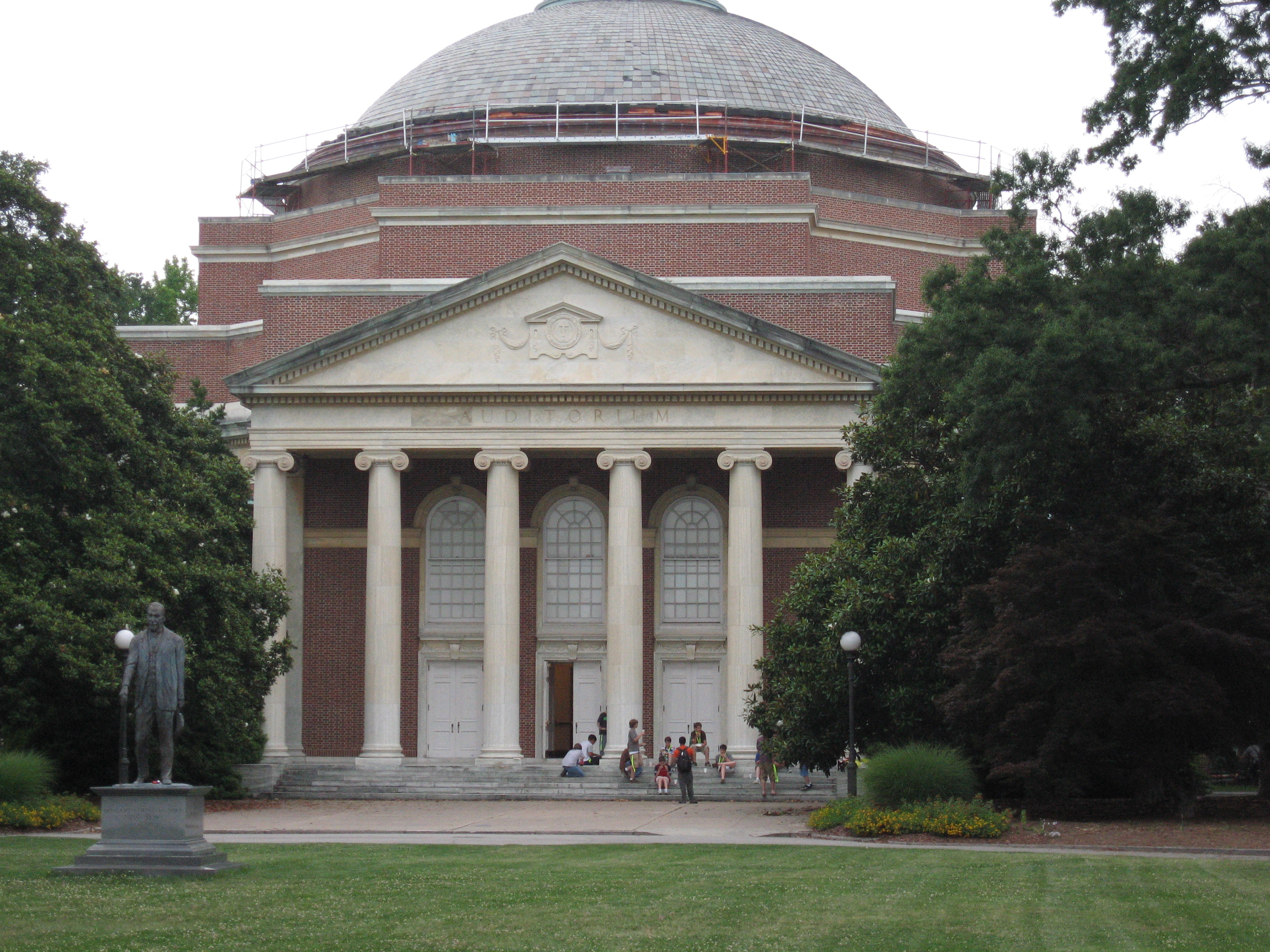
- Baldwin Auditorium on East Campus

General information
- Architectural style: Georgian architecture
- Location: Duke University; North Carolina; United States
- Coordinates: 36°0′19.7755″N 78°54′53.1382″W

Website
- https://studentaffairs.duke.edu/hdrl/housing-communities/east-campus

East Campus is part of Duke University's campus in Durham, North Carolina. East Campus, along with West Campus, make up most of Duke's main campus. The campus follows the Georgian architecture style, making it distinct from West Campus. Currently, East Campus is the exclusive residential home to first-year students. It borders Trinity Historic District to the east and Walltown Neighborhood to the north.

== History ==
The first history of Duke University traces back to its founding in 1838 in Trinity, North Carolina.

In 1887, Julian S. Carr, a "long-time trustee and the largest benefactor of the college to date," donated $10,000 ($341,000 adjusted for inflation) and chaired a search committee that selected John F. Crowell as the new President of Trinity College, "a decision that dramatically changed the direction of the institution."

By 1890, President Crowell persuaded Carr to donate his 62 acre Blackwell Park valued at $50,000 ($1,780,000 adjusted for inflation), named after the Bull Durham Tobacco-producing company that Carr was President of W. T. Blackwell, and Washington Duke to donate $85,000 ($3,026,000 adjusted for inflation) for Trinity's new campus in Durham, North Carolina.

The new campus was constructed over the course of the last decade of the nineteenth century.

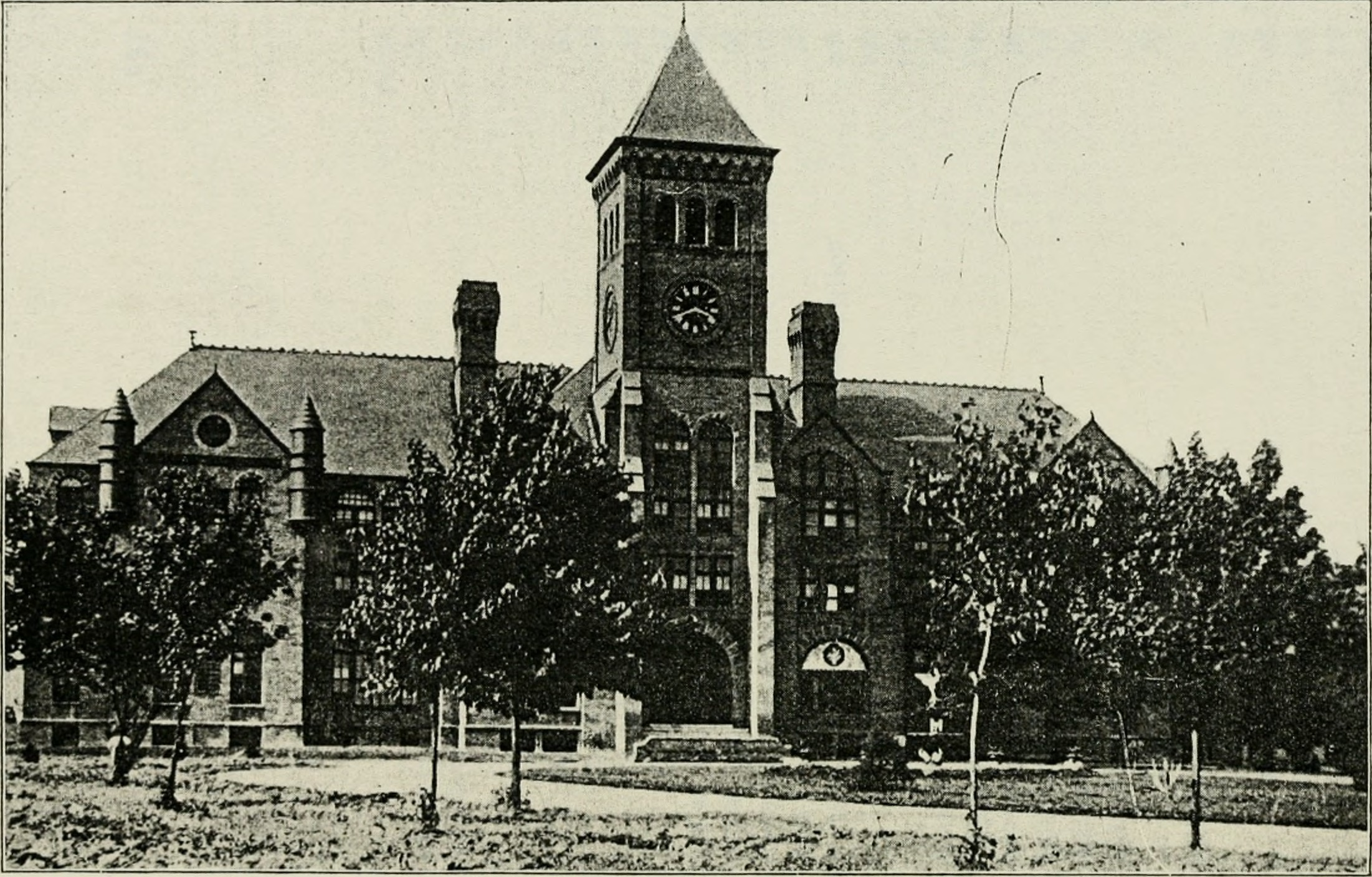
Original Bell Tower (circa 1899)

In 1911, the Washington Duke Building was destroyed in a fire. The university created the buildings East Duke and West Duke (not to be confused with East Campus and West Campus) to serve as a replacement with expanded classroom and office space.

In 1930, the Classroom Building was officially named "...In memory of Julian S. Carr, who gave the land on which these buildings stand. ERECTED BY JAMES B. DUKE." The university would later restore the name of the building from the Carr Building to the Classroom Building in 2018.

In 1938, after the opening of Duke's West Campus for the then all-male undergraduate Trinity College of Arts and Sciences, East Campus became the exclusive campus for Duke's Undergraduate Women's College.

Unlike West Campus, where the campus is surrounded by forest owned by the university, East Campus is surrounded by private property not owned by the university. Thus, much of Duke's development, except for living spaces, has occurred on West Campus.

In 1972, as part of the merging of Duke's Women's College and Duke's Men's Trinity College, the campus became coeducational. Unlike at Harvard University, where the merger between its all-female Radcliffe College and all-male Harvard College took 22 years, the coeducational merger between Duke's undergraduate colleges were merged in a single year.

In 1997, as part of a university-wide change, East Campus became solely the housing for first-year students. This decision was made so that each Duke undergraduate class would feel a sense of connectedness, and it also allows students to better understand the SLG, Greek, or Independent House groups they are eligible to join in the second semester of their first year.

In 2018, Duke opened Trinity Dorm to offset the closings of the historic East and Epworth houses.

== First-year Housing ==
Unlike that of West Campus, East Campus is not organized into quadrangles, rather it has individual houses and residential halls. Because East Campus is only for first-year students, the campus does not have housing for Selected Living Groups or Greek Organizations. The joining process for these organizations occurs in the spring of an undergraduate's first-year.

=== Residence Halls ===
The Residence Hall concept represents the newer dormitories on East Campus. The dormitories are typically larger than their older "house" counterparts.

- Bell Tower Residence Hall
- Blackwell Residence Hall
- Randolph Residence Hall
- Gilbert-Addoms Residence Hall
- Trinity Residence Hall

=== Houses ===
Although the "house" style dormitories are smaller and older than the newer Residence Halls on West Campus, Duke has recently renovated many of the "houses."

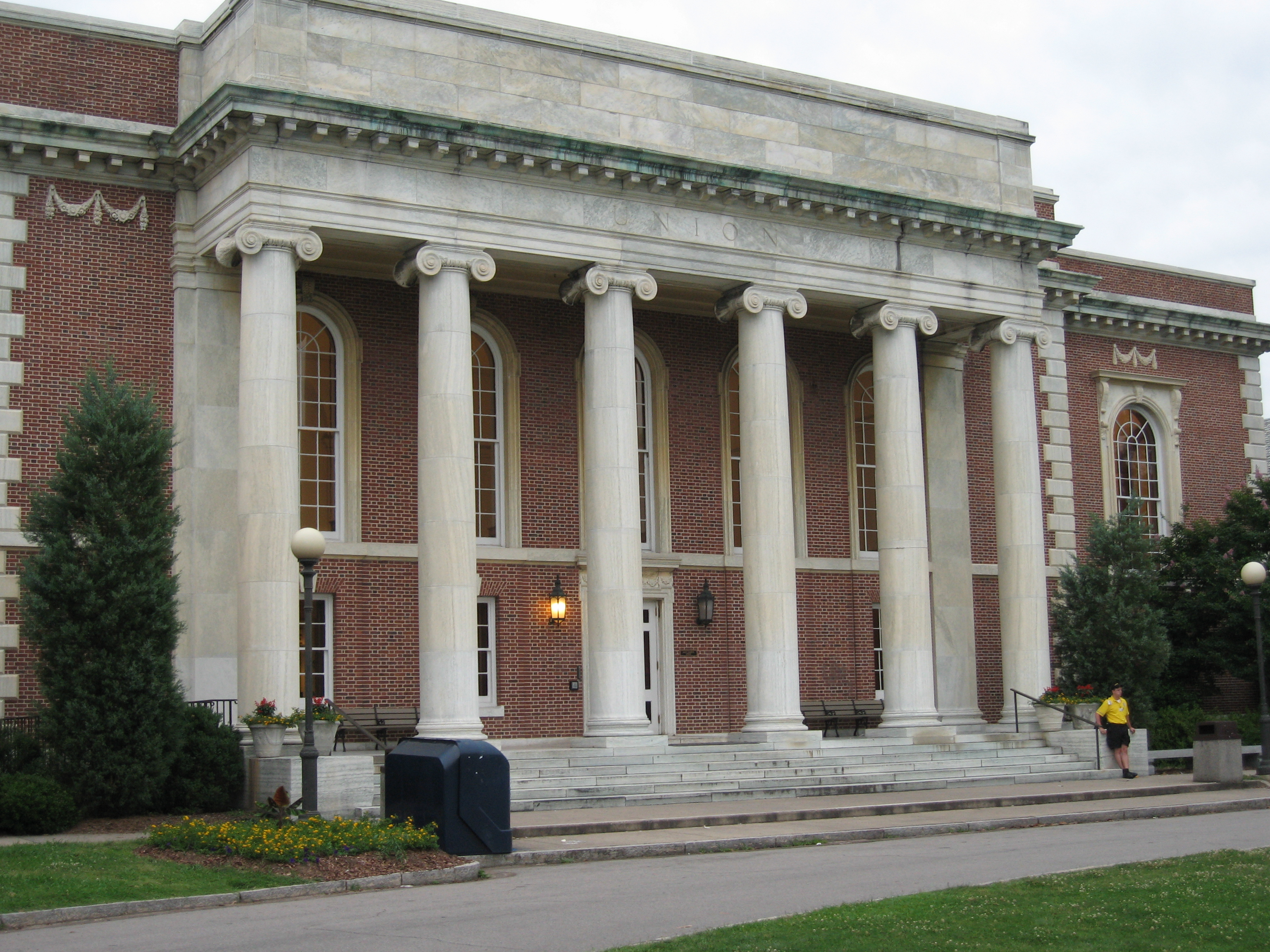
Marketplace Dining Facility

- Epworth House, the oldest structure still in operation at Duke University, originally opened in 1892
- Alspaugh House
- Bassett House
- Brown House
- East House
- Giles House
- West House
- Pegram House
- Southgate House
- Wilson House

== Student Life on East Campus ==
Besides the first year housing buildings, there are other facilities on East Campus that freshmen students can use.

=== Brodie Recreation Center ===
Brodie is the athletic complex that freshmen students use. It is available to everyone affiliated with Duke but the people who use the gym are more likely to be freshmen. You have the tap in your DukeID to enter the building. It is located behind the tennis courts and behind Lily. The recreation center was opened in 1996 as the Memorial Gym (built in 1923) was renovated. The center is about 50,000 square feet.

The Amenities include:

- Cardio equipment
- Racquetball court
- Core & strength areas
- 4 wood basketball/volleyball courts
- Classroom
- Weight Room
- Multi-purpose room with mirrors
- Mind & Body Studio
- Outdoor balcony
- Saunas
- Day lockers

=== Student Union ===
First-year students who live on East Campus often eat at the original Trinity College Student Union (commonly regarded as "Marketplace" among students). The Student Union covers breakfast and dinner from student's meal plans which are included in the tuition, but if students choose to eat lunch at Marketplace, they have to pay using their food points. The food is served in an open buffet format.

The Student Union also has classrooms on the second and ground floor. Student can use these areas to study or meet up for a group project.

On the ground floor, Trinity Cafe is open to service throughout the day. Trinity Cafe offers a variety of snacks and drinks for freshmen. Items can be purchased using Duke food points or Duke flex points.

=== Lilly Library ===
Lilly is the library on East Campus which is specifically used by freshmen. The Library is a 3 story building which has a lot of seating areas for freshmen to study. A majority of the freshmen study here at night after classes.

== Transportation ==
The overall shape of Duke University in Durham is bar-bell shaped, with two ends of West Campus and East Campus. Duke provides regular transportation services to connect students between the two campuses (known commonly as the "C1").

== See also ==
- Duke University West Campus
- Duke University Medical Center
- Talent Identification Program
