= John Edward Sawyer =

American academic

John Edward Sawyer (May 5, 1917 – February 7, 1995) was a prominent academic and philanthropic administrator. He was educated at Worcester Academy and then Deerfield Academy, Williams College, and Harvard University. He served as the 11th president of Williams College, and headed the Andrew W. Mellon Foundation. He was a member of the American Academy of Arts and Sciences, the American Philosophical Society, and the National Academy of Sciences. In 1988 Sawyer was awarded the Public Welfare Medal from the National Academy of Sciences.

Academic offices
Preceded by James Phinney Baxter III	President of Williams College; 1961–1973	Succeeded by John Wesley Chandler
Preceded by Nathan Pusey	President of Andrew W. Mellon Foundation; 1975–1987	Succeeded by William G. Bowen
