= Nathan Pusey =

President of Harvard University from 1953 to 1971

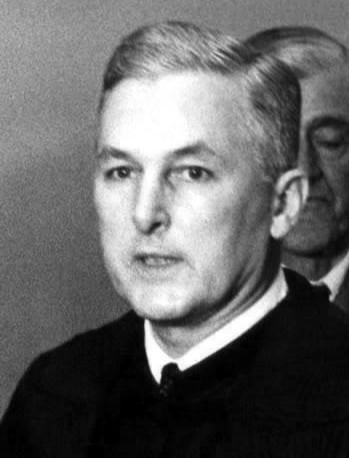
- Pusey at Boston College, where he received an honorary degree in 1963

2nd President of Andrew W. Mellon Foundation
- In office 1971–1975
- Preceded by: Charles Hamilton
- Succeeded by: John Edward Sawyer

24th President of Harvard University
- In office 1953–1971
- Preceded by: James B. Conant
- Succeeded by: Derek Bok

10th President of Lawrence College
- In office 1944–1953
- Preceded by: Thomas Nichols Barrows
- Succeeded by: Douglas Maitland Knight

Personal details
- Born: Nathan Marsh Pusey; April 4, 1907 Council Bluffs, Iowa, U.S.
- Died: November 14, 2001 (aged 94) New York City, U.S.
- Spouse: Anne Woodward (m. 1936)
- Children: 3
- Education: Harvard University (BA, MA, PhD)

Nathan Marsh Pusey (/ˈpjuːzi/; April 4, 1907 – November 14, 2001) was an American academic. Originally from Council Bluffs, Iowa, Pusey won a scholarship to Harvard University out of high school and went on to earn bachelor's, master's, and doctorate degrees in the classics at Harvard. Pusey began his academic career as a professor of literature at Scripps College and Wesleyan University before serving as president of Lawrence College from 1944 to 1953.

Serving as President of Harvard University from 1953 to 1971, Pusey was the first president of Harvard from outside New England. After his time at Harvard, he was president of the Andrew W. Mellon Foundation from 1971 to 1975.

== Early life and education ==
Nathan Marsh Pusey was born on April 4, 1907, in Council Bluffs, Iowa, to John and Rosa Pusey. His great uncle William Henry Mills Pusey had served as an Iowa state senator and member of the United States House of Representatives. He shared a name with another great uncle, Iowa state senator Nathan Marsh Pusey. The younger Pusey was educated at Harvard College (B.A.), and received M.A. (1928) and Ph.D. (1937) degrees from Harvard University, studying English literature and ancient history. During his freshman year in college, he lived in Stoughton Hall.

== Educational career ==
Pusey's first teaching post after he graduated was at Riverdale Country School. He then taught at Lawrence College as a tutor from 1935 to 1938, as an assistant professor of history and literature at Scripps College from 1938 to 1940, and as an associate professor of classics at Wesleyan University from 1940 to 1944.

He served as president of Lawrence College (1944–1953) and later as the 24th president of Harvard University (1953–1971).

Pusey vigorously opposed McCarthyism in the 1950s and supported the US Civil Rights Movement in the 1960s. His clashes with Joseph McCarthy were especially significant because Pusey's position at Lawrence College placed him in the senator's hometown (Appleton, Wisconsin) and amid the political power base of the then-conservative Fox Valley. As president of the college, Pusey held the community's respect, and his vocal criticisms of McCarthy resounded loudly in the area.

During his presidency of Harvard, Pusey overhauled the admissions process, which had been biased heavily in favor of the alumni of New England–based boarding schools, and began admitting public school graduates based on scores obtained on standardized tests such as the SAT. This was highly controversial with the school's alumni population but set the stage for diversifying the student body and faculty.

Pusey was a deeply religious man and a somewhat traditionalist scholar, and he was appalled by the student radicalism that raged in American universities in the late 1960s. He complained bitterly that "learning has almost ceased" in many universities because of the violent, revolutionary activities of a "small group of overeager young... who feel they have a special calling to redeem society." In April 1969, student activists occupied Harvard's University Hall (the building that housed most of the administrative offices) in protest over the presence of ROTC on campus at the height of the Vietnam War. In response, Pusey summoned local and state police to arrest the demonstrators. Although his action was legal, it was widely criticized, and the resulting furor probably contributed to his early retirement in 1971. After his time at Harvard, Pusey was president of the Andrew W. Mellon Foundation (1971–1975) and president of the United Board for Christian Higher Education in Asia (1979–1980).

== Personal life ==
Pusey was a devout, lifelong Episcopalian who deplored the “almost idolatrous” secularism of his era. He was an active member of All Saints Episcopal Church in Appleton, Wisconsin, during his presidency of Lawrence College.

He married Anne Woodward in 1936. The couple later had three children.

Pusey Library, an underground building at Harvard was named for him. It was announced in 1971 and opened in 1976. It houses a number of special collections and the Harvard Archives.

Puse died in 2001 at the age of 94.

== Published works ==
- The Age of the Scholar, 1963
- American Higher Education 1945–1970: A Personal Report, 1978

== Notes ==
Academic offices
| Preceded by Thomas Nichols Barrows | President of Lawrence University; 1944–1953 | Succeeded by Douglas Maitland Knight |
| Preceded by James B. Conant | President of Harvard University; 1953–1971 | Succeeded by Derek C. Bok |
| Preceded by Charles Hamilton | President of Andrew W. Mellon Foundation; 1971–1975 | Succeeded by John Edward Sawyer |
