= Pusey Library =

Underground library at Harvard University

Nathan Marsh Pusey Library
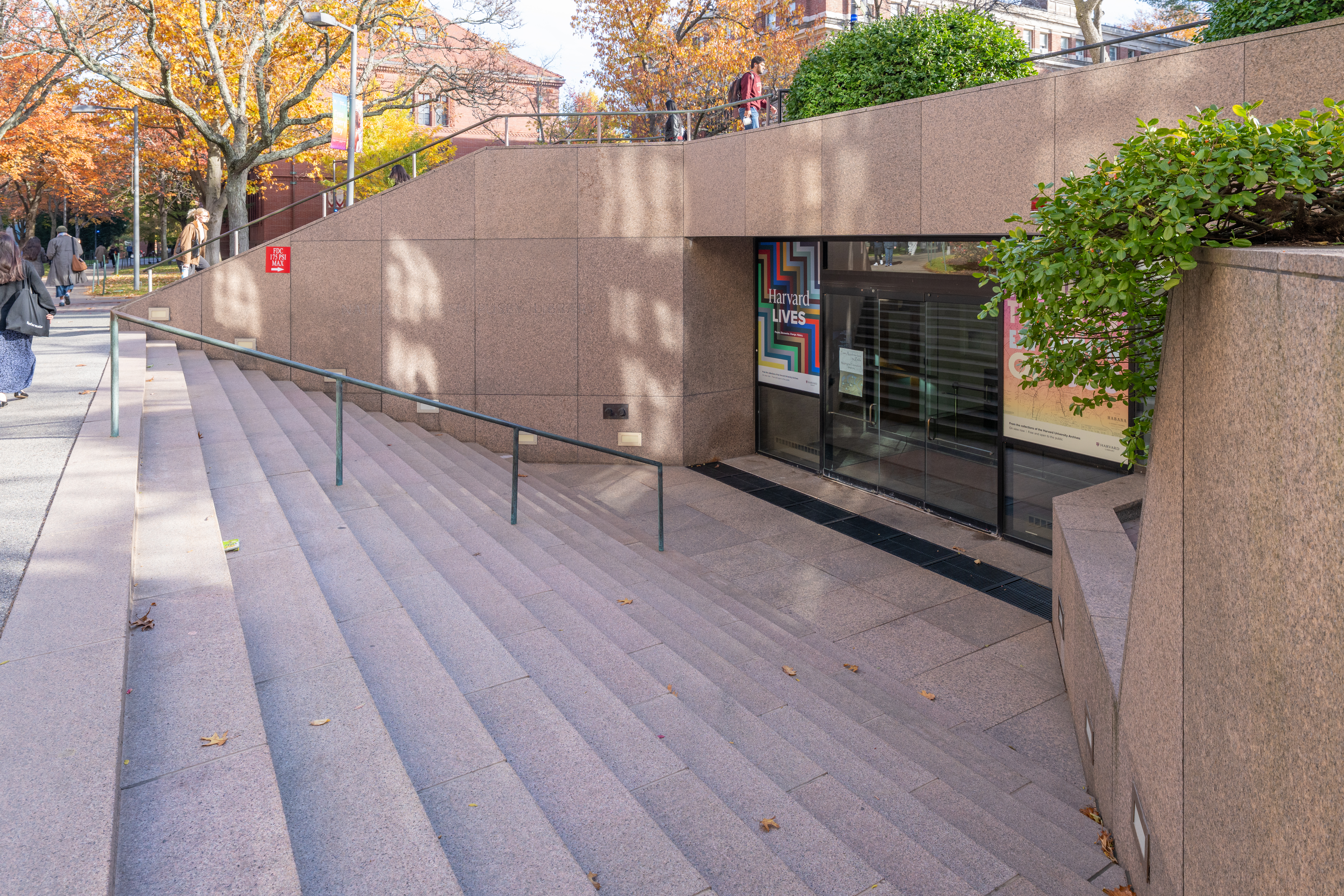
- 42°22′23″N 71°6′55″W
- Location: Harvard University, Cambridge, Massachusetts, United States
- Established: February 1976
- Architect: Hugh Stubbins and Associates
- Branch of: Harvard Library

Nathan Marsh Pusey Library is an underground library at Harvard University. Announced in June 1971, it is named for Nathan Pusey, president of Harvard from 1953 to 1971. It contains the Harvard University Archives, and is the first library built with a halon-gas fire-extinguishing system..
