= New Canaan Country School =

Private day school in New Canaan, Connecticut

Location
- 635 Frogtown Road; New Canaan, Connecticut; United States
- Coordinates: 41°07′54″N 73°31′20″W

Information
- Type: private, day
- Motto: Audentes fortuna juvat (Fortune favors the bold)
- Established: 1916
- Headmaster: Aaron Cooper
- Campus: 75 acres (300,000 m^{2})
- Colors: Blue and white
- Mascot: Cougar
- Yearbook: Beginners End
- Website: countryschool.net

New Canaan Country School (abbreviated NCCS) is an independent, private day school in New Canaan, Connecticut for students in Beginners (age 3) through Grade 9 from Fairfield and Westchester Counties. The current head of school is Aaron Cooper.

== Overview ==
NCCS is a private, independent school for beginners (ages three and four) through ninth grade, located on a 75-acre campus with five academic buildings. The campus includes 30 acres of woodland trails.

A bus program enables the school to serve families in surrounding communities of Darien, Norwalk, Stamford, Ridgefield, and Wilton, as well as New Canaan. Financial aid is available to families who qualify.

The athletic program is mandatory for the middle and upper schools. In the fall trimester, students can choose from soccer (boys' and girls' teams), boys' football, girls' field hockey, or co-ed cross country. In the winter trimester the options are basketball (boys' and girls'), co-ed squash, co-ed yoga, co-ed fitness and co-ed paddle tennis. A drama program is also available to students in place of playing a sport for a season and has always been an option for upper schoolers. In the spring, the options are lacrosse (boys' and girls' teams), boys' baseball, girls' softball, and co-ed cross country.

As of 2017–18, the school had 640 students and a student-to-teacher ratio of 6:1. The average faculty member has 17 years teaching experience, and 65% of faculty have graduate degrees. Twenty-four percent of students received financial aid awards totaling $3,310,000. Twenty percent of the students are classified as students of color.

Blue and white are the primary colors of the school. The mascot for middle and upper school athletics is the cougar.

== Buildings ==
There are four divisions within the entire campus: The Thacher Building (preschool–kindergarten) named for former headmaster Nick Thacher; The Welles Building (Grades 1–4; also called "Lower School"); The Middle School (Grades 5–6); and The Stevens Building (Grades 7–9; also called "Upper School"), as well as one administrative/functional building. It is called the Grace House or Main Building. There is also an Athletic Center, opened in 2020. The ninth grade year is a unique pre-preparatory program that emphasizes teaching leadership and independent thinking skills. A fully staffed placement office works with students to coordinate placement in top boarding and day schools.

The Stevens Building was opened in September, 2007, with science labs, art studios, and expanded classroom and meeting facilities for use by students in Grades 7–9. The building was recognized by the U.S. Green Building Council with the LEED (Leadership in Energy Efficient Design) Silver Award. On Earth Day, Senator Judith Freeman presented a proclamation from Governor Jodi Rell in recognition of its being the greenest school building in the state of Connecticut.

== Notable alumni ==
- Paul Bremer, American diplomat, class of 1956
- H. Keith H. Brodie, psychiatrist, educator, and former President of Duke University.
- Patricia Lynch Ewell, former US Ambassador to Madagascar and the Comoros.
- Dave Forney, electrical engineer who made contributions in telecommunication system theory
- Peter C. Goldmark, environmentalist
- Hardy Jones, wildlife and conservation filmmaker, class of 1958
- Allison Mleczko, ice hockey player
- Hedrick Smith, journalist
- John V. Tunney, former US Senator and Representative for the State of California.
- James Vanderbilt, screenwriter and producer
- Mo Vaughn, former Major League Baseball first baseman
- Allison Williams, actress
- John Hayden, NHL forward currently with the Seattle Kraken
