= H. Keith H. Brodie =

American physician (1939–2016)

Keith Brodie
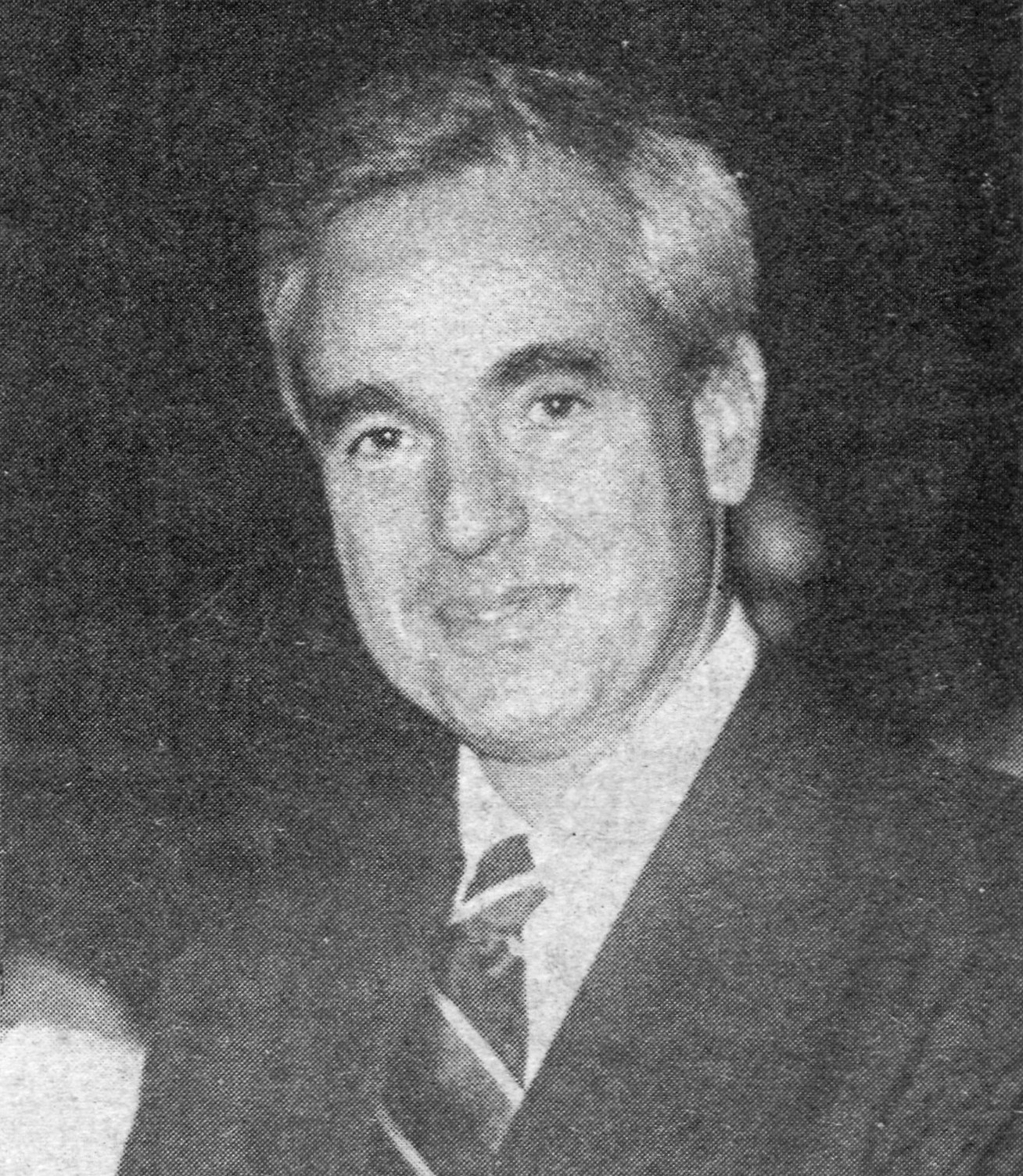
- Brodie circa 1986

7th President of Duke University
- In office 1985–1993
- Preceded by: Terry Sanford
- Succeeded by: Nannerl O. Keohane

Personal details
- Born: August 24, 1939 New Canaan, Connecticut
- Died: December 2, 2016 (aged 77) Durham, North Carolina
- Education: Princeton University; Columbia University College of Physicians and Surgeons
- Occupation: psychiatrist

Harlow Keith Hammond Brodie (August 24, 1939 – December 2, 2016) was an American psychiatrist, educator, and former president of Duke University.

== Life and education ==
Born in New Canaan, Connecticut, Brodie attended the New Canaan Country School before studying chemistry at Princeton University and medicine at the Columbia University College of Physicians and Surgeons. He and classmate Davida Coady tutored nurses in pharmacology and other subjects and assisted with basic medical care at the Firestone Hospital in Harbel, Liberia.

He completed an internship in internal medicine at the Ochsner Foundation Hospital in New Orleans and a residency in psychiatry at Columbia Presbyterian Medical Center.

== Career ==
In 1968, Brodie joined the National Institute of Mental Health as a clinical associate.

From 1970 to 1974 he taught at Stanford University and was chair of Stanford's Medical School Faculty Senate and director of the General Research Center.

In 1974, Brodie moved to Duke University to chair the department of psychiatry, with the encouragement of Ewald "Bud" Busse, who was leaving the chairmanship to become dean of the School of Medicine. He was later named James B. Duke Professor of Psychiatry and Law. in 1982, he became chancellor and in 1985 president of Duke University serving until 1993. As president Brodie helped to expand applications to graduate and undergraduate programs and increase Duke's national reputation as a research university. He also led efforts to increase racial/ethnic diversity among the faculty through the "Black Faculty Initiative", a program that would be echoed by his successor, Nan Keohane, through the creation of the Women's Initiative. After his term as president, Brodie continued teaching and clinical work, and published two books on the university presidency.

== Publication ==
Handbook of Psychiatry volume 29 ISBN 978-620-0-48143-6; cowritten with Javad Nurbakhsh; and Hamideh Jahangiri.

== Awards ==
Brodie received the A.E. Bennett Research Award from the Society of Biological Psychiatry, the psychopharmacology prize of the American Psychological Association, and the Edward A. Streck Award of the Pennsylvania Hospital and the University of Pennsylvania Health System. He served as president of the American Psychiatric Association and chaired the Board of Mental Health and Behavioral Medicine of the Institute of Medicine.

== Duke University ==
While serving as university president, Brodie opted to live at his own private residence rather than in the president's official residence, the J. Deryl Hart House, or the guest residence, Kirby House.
