= Graduate School of Duke University =

Coordinates: 36°00′01″N 78°55′43″W

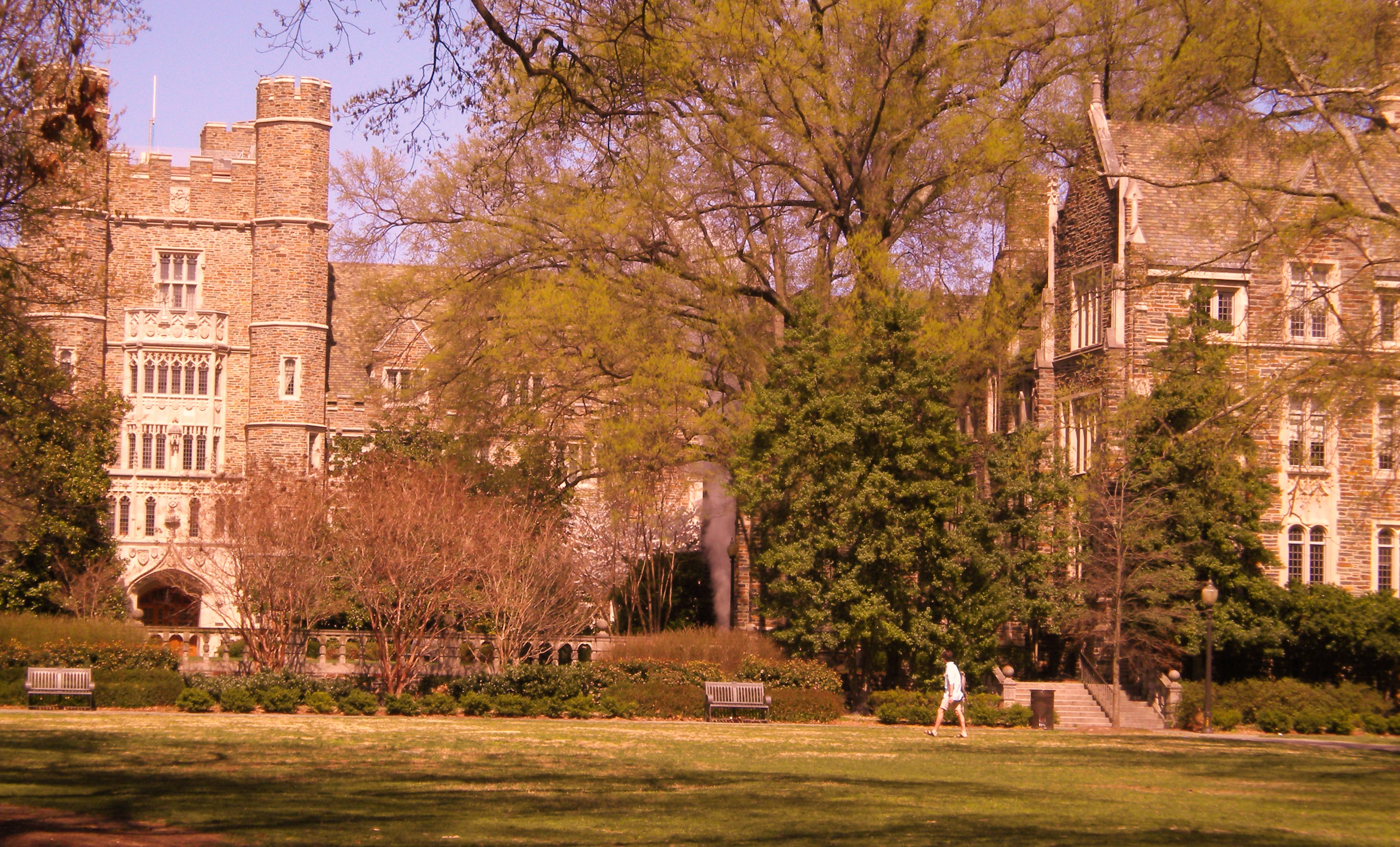
- Type: Private Graduate School
- Established: 1926
- Parent institution: Duke University
- Dean: Suzanne Barbour
- Faculty: 1,300
- Students: 3,500
- Location: Durham, North Carolina, U.S.
- Website: gradschool.duke.edu

The Graduate School of Duke University is one of ten graduate and professional schools that make up the university. Established in 1926, the Graduate School offers the degrees of Master of Arts, Master of Science, Master of Arts in Teaching, Master of Public Policy, and the Doctor of Philosophy, as well as various certificate programs. The current dean of The Graduate School is Suzanne Barbour, Ph.D., Professor of Cell Biology, who joined Duke in 2022.

== Overview ==
The Graduate School is administered by a dean, who with the advice an executive committee of the Graduate Faculty, coordinates the graduate offerings of all departments in the Arts and Sciences, the non-professional degree programs of the professional schools of divinity, law, business, environment and earth sciences, the basic science departments of the School of Medicine, and certain professionally oriented graduate programs as well. The Graduate School enrolls approximately 2,220 students. At Duke, the graduate faculty (currently numbering 1,000) consists of all members of the university faculty who have been so designated by their respective departments or schools and approved by the dean of the Graduate School.

== History ==
Originally called the Graduate School of Arts and Sciences, in February 1968 the Duke University Board of Trustees changed the name to "The Graduate School" to better reflect the school's responsibilities for graduate education outside of Arts and Sciences. Since the early 1960s, the dean of the Graduate School has concurrently held the title of vice provost. This dual title is in recognition of the role played by the dean in reviewing academic departments and doctoral programs throughout the university.
