= Trinity College of Arts and Sciences =

Undergraduate liberal arts college of Duke University

- Former name: Brown School
- Type: Private, Undergraduate
- Established: 1838
- Parent institution: Duke University
- Dean: Gary Bennett
- Undergraduates: 5,400
- Location: Durham, North Carolina, North Carolina; 36°0′5″N 78°56′18″W
- Website: trinity.duke.edu

The Trinity College of Arts and Sciences is the undergraduate liberal arts college of Duke University. Founded in 1838, it is the original school of the university. Currently, Trinity is one of five undergraduate degree programs at Duke, the others being the Edmund T. Pratt School of Engineering, Nicholas School of the Environment, School of Nursing, and Duke Kunshan University.

At Duke, Arts & Sciences is the collective name of all educational programs, research programs, and faculty in the humanities, social sciences, and the natural sciences at Duke, inclusive of undergraduate programs and many degree programs in Duke's Graduate School.

The division's unusual dual name may reflect the fact that it is responsible for undergraduate education (through Trinity College) and graduate education and research (Arts and Sciences).

== History ==
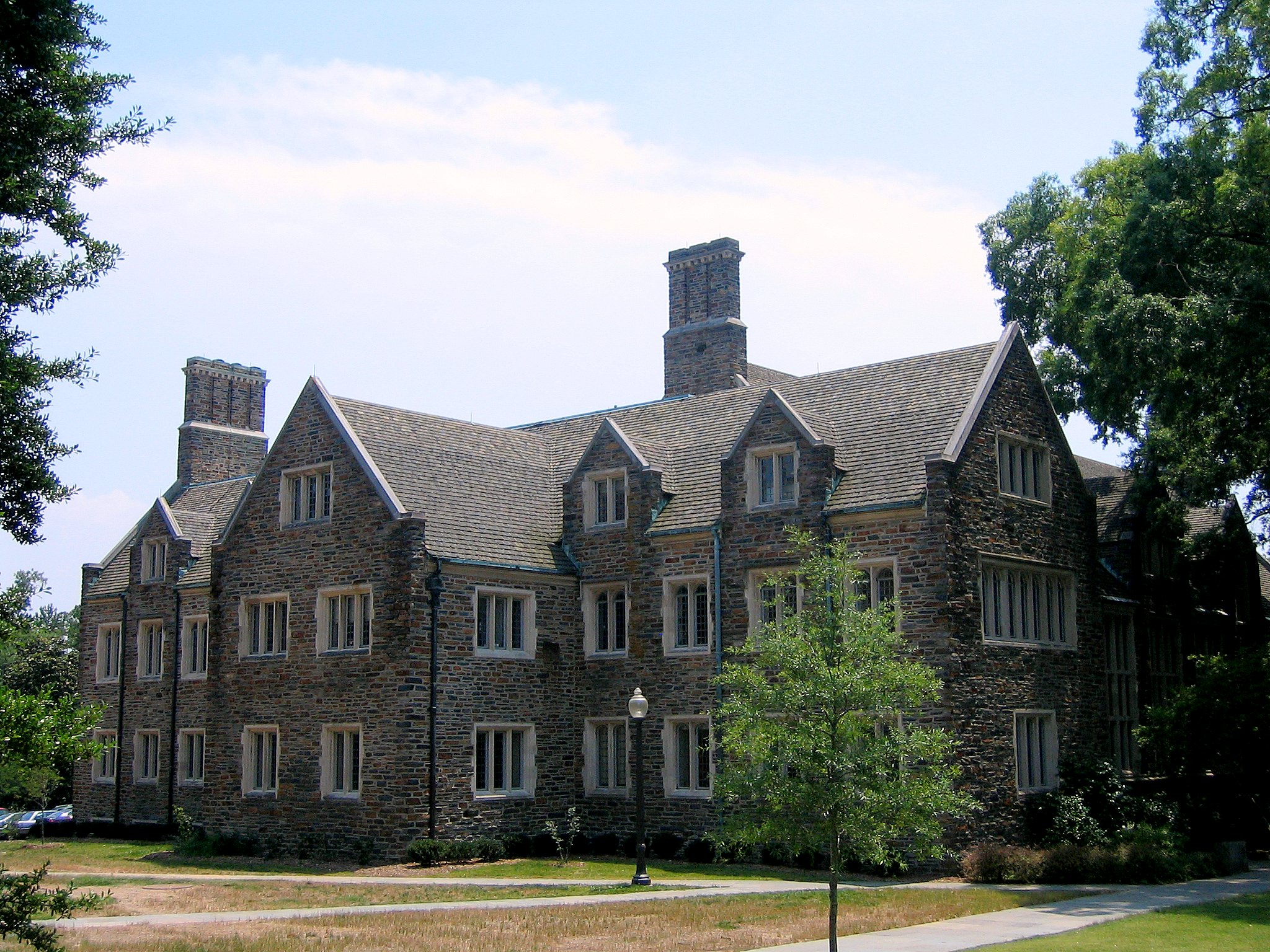
Social Sciences building

Trinity College was the name of the predecessor of Duke University. Tobacco magnate and philanthropist James Buchanan Duke left a $24 million bequest to transform the college into a research university called "Duke University" in honor of his father Washington Duke. In 1930, the institution's original Durham campus became known as the Women's College of Duke University, while Trinity continued as the name of the undergraduate men's college. The West or Gothic campus about a mile from East Campus became home to Trinity College, along with Duke University Hospital and the graduate and professional schools. The two colleges continued as coordinate residential and degree-granting entities for forty years. However, there was always a single faculty of Arts and Sciences responsible for undergraduate and graduate instruction. Trinity College and the Women's College merged in 1972 to form Trinity College of Arts and Sciences and the East and West campus became co-educational.

== Organization ==
The college is a constituent school of Duke University and contains a dependent system of residential colleges. Although it is a "college," its highest ranking officer is its Dean.

The interim dean of Trinity College of Arts & Sciences is Mohamed Noor, previously Dean of Natural Sciences for three years. Former dean Valerie Ashby, professor of chemistry, left her second term early to become President of the University of Maryland, Baltimore County in 2022. Each dean is appointed to the position for a five-year term, and the position serves under the university's provost and president.

Due to Duke's interdisciplinary approach, it is common for faculty to hold cross-college appointments; however, all faculty of the college are also faculty within Duke's Graduate School of Arts and Sciences.

In the beginning of the twenty-first century, Duke renovated the undergraduate residential college experience. In the present day, the residential colleges are funded and controlled by the University, not by the college. Each residential college has a specific dean, headed by one residential "Associate Dean." Note, these deans are not the heads of specific departments, but rather general undergraduate deans. Each department has an independent department head who oversees both the undergraduate and graduate education within the specific department.

== Residential colleges ==
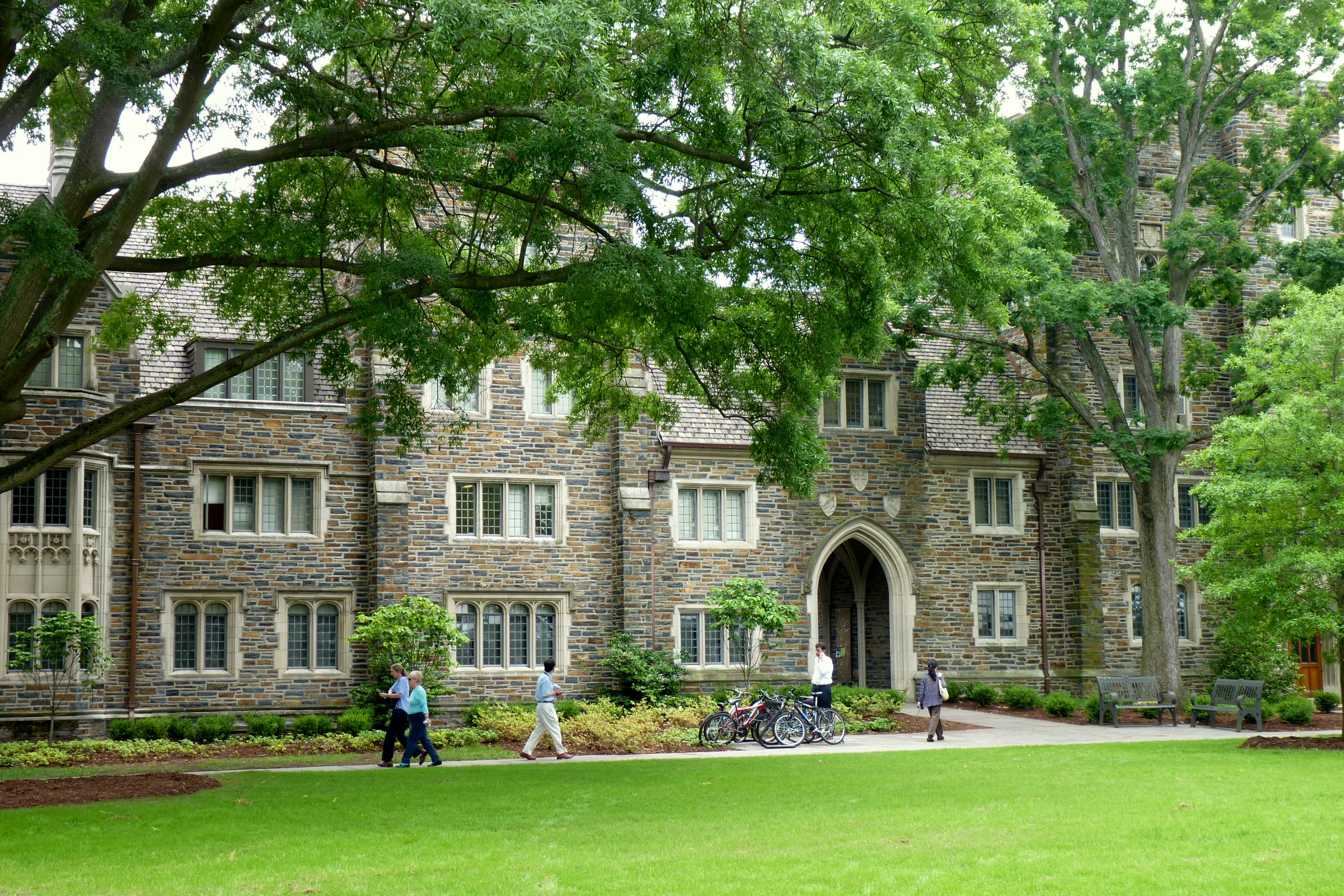
Craven, one of the West Campus Residential Colleges

All undergraduate students at Duke University live within the residential college system, regardless of if the students are enrolled in the college of Arts and Sciences or Engineering. By keeping all undergraduates, regardless of their undergraduate college affiliation, in one system allows for one integrated Duke undergraduate community.

All undergraduate freshman at Duke since the merger of the Women's College in 1972 live on the east part of campus. After their freshman year, undergraduates have the ability to rush certain "houses" within the residential college system, located on the west part of campus. Although similar to the residential housing systems at Yale and Harvard, Duke's is distinct due to the tradition of freshman and upperclassmen living on separately designated parts of campus.

== Current programs ==
At Duke, the undergraduate experience centers around Trinity College, with Engineering students taking approximately half of their Duke common curriculum within Trinity. Engineering students are able to enroll in any classes within the liberal arts college, and Trinity students are able to enroll in any classes within the engineering college.

The Duke undergraduate curriculum includes a focus on the humanities. All freshman students take a writing class and a current-issues seminar class.

The Graduate School trains roughly 1200 doctoral and masters students in the arts and sciences as well as in divinity, engineering, business, and environmental and earth sciences.

== Departments ==
The following departments are within the college and offer either a B.A., B.S., or minor:

- Sciences
  - Biology
  - Biophysics
  - Chemistry
  - Computational Biology & Bioinformatics
  - Computer Science (commonly combined with Electrical Engineering within the Pratt undergraduate college to form Duke's EECS degree)
  - Earth and Ocean Sciences
  - Economics (where a Finance minor and Financial Economics concentration are available)
  - Environmental Studies
  - Global Health
  - Mathematics
  - Neuroscience
  - Physics
  - Statistical Sciences
- Cultural Studies
  - African & African American Studies
  - Art History
  - Asian & Middle Eastern Studies
  - Cultural Anthropology
  - Dance
  - Evolutionary Anthropology
  - Global Cultural Studies
  - History
  - International Comparative Studies
  - Medieval & Renaissance Studies
  - Music
  - Philosophy
  - Psychology
  - Public Policy (in conjunction with Sanford School of Public Policy)
  - Political Science
  - Religious Studies
  - Theater Studies
- Languages
  - American Sign Language
  - Brazilian & Portuguese
  - Classics (Ancient Latin / Ancient Greek)
  - English
  - French
  - German
  - Greek (modern)
  - Italian
  - Linguistics
  - Romance Studies
  - Russian
  - Slavic & Eurasian
  - Spanish

== See also ==
- Pratt School of Engineering, Duke's other undergraduate college
- Sanford School of Public Policy, which offers a major within Trinity College
- Nicholas School of the Environment, which offers 3 majors within Trinity College
- Duke Kunshan University, a joint-venture university between Duke and Wuhan University located in Kunshan, China.
- Fuqua School of Business, Duke's business school which offers graduate level business and economic programs
