= Duke University West Campus =

Campus in Durham, North Carolina, US

West Campus
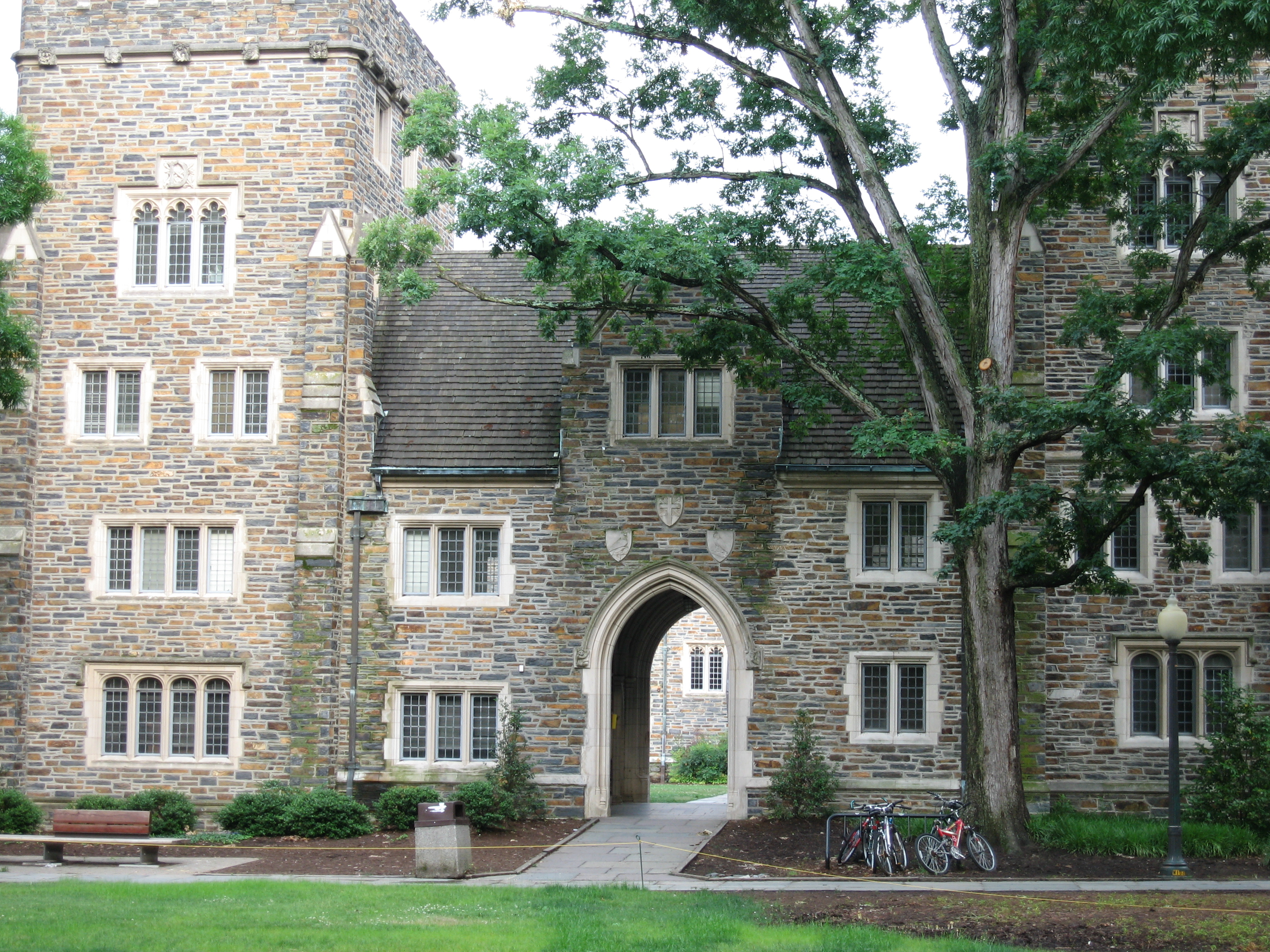
- Craven Quad on West Campus

General information
- Architectural style: Collegiate Gothic
- Location: Duke University; North Carolina; United States
- Coordinates: 36°0′5.99″N 78°56′23.32″W

Website
- https://studentaffairs.duke.edu/hdrl/housing-communities/west-campus

West Campus is part of Duke University's campus in Durham, North Carolina. West Campus, along with East Campus, make up most of Duke's main campus. The campus follows the Collegiate Gothic architecture style, inspired by the mid-18th century Gothic Revival style, making it distinct from East Campus. This was in a similar set-up as Cornell University's West Campus built a decade prior.

== History ==
James Buchanan Duke's relationship with architect Horace Trumbauer began in 1912, when Duke commissioned the "costliest home" on New York City's Fifth Avenue, according to The New York Times.

In 1924, Trumbauer was commissioned to build a second campus for Duke University. In 1925, Julian Abele, the first African-American graduate of the University of Pennsylvania School of Architecture and the chief designer in the Trumbauer firm, began work on the proposed West Campus. Abele's renderings included the Duke Chapel (one of the tallest university chapels in the world), the first four housing quadrangles (now Craven, Crowell, Few, and, Kilgo), the library (now Perkins Library), Student Union (now the Richard H. Brodhead Center), and departmental buildings. The original West Campus opened all at once in 1938, to serve as the expanded home for Duke's Trinity College of Arts and Sciences, at the time an all-the male undergraduate college.

By 1928, Cameron Indoor Stadium for Duke men's basketball and Wallace Wade Stadium for Duke football had opened. Both stadiums have been renovated in recent years, and renovations were completed by 2017.

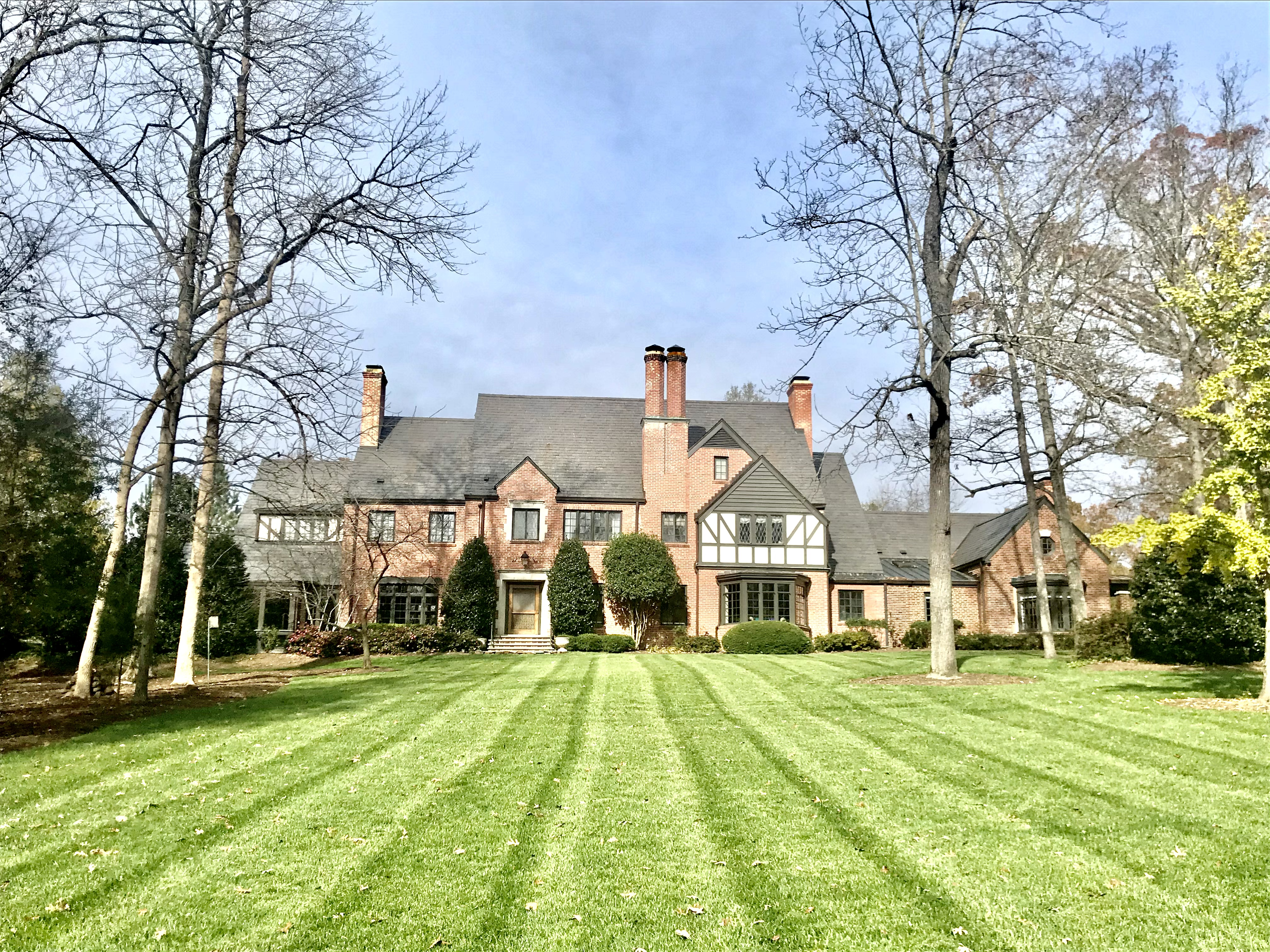
The J. Deryl Hart House

In 1934 the J. Deryl Hart House, named after university president Julian Deryl Hart, was completed. The house serves as the official residence for Duke's presidents.

In July 1939, the Board of Trustees approved the first expansion to the original West Campus, adding the Few Quadrangle, houses FF, GG, and HH. Although previous dorms on the university had meeting spaces, these dorms were the first in Duke's history to include common spaces for students throughout the house to interact. Since this time, most of Duke's dormitories have been retrofitted to include common rooms.

In 1968, the Paul M. Gross Hall opened to serve as the home for the Chemistry department. After additional space for the department was completed, the university remodeled the building in 2015 to reconfigure the building to serve as a maker space and the headquarters for Duke's Social Science Research Institute, part of the Economics Department.

In 1972, as part of the merging of Duke's Women's College and Duke's Men's Trinity College, the campus became coeducational. The coeducational merger between Duke's undergraduate colleges were merged in a single year.

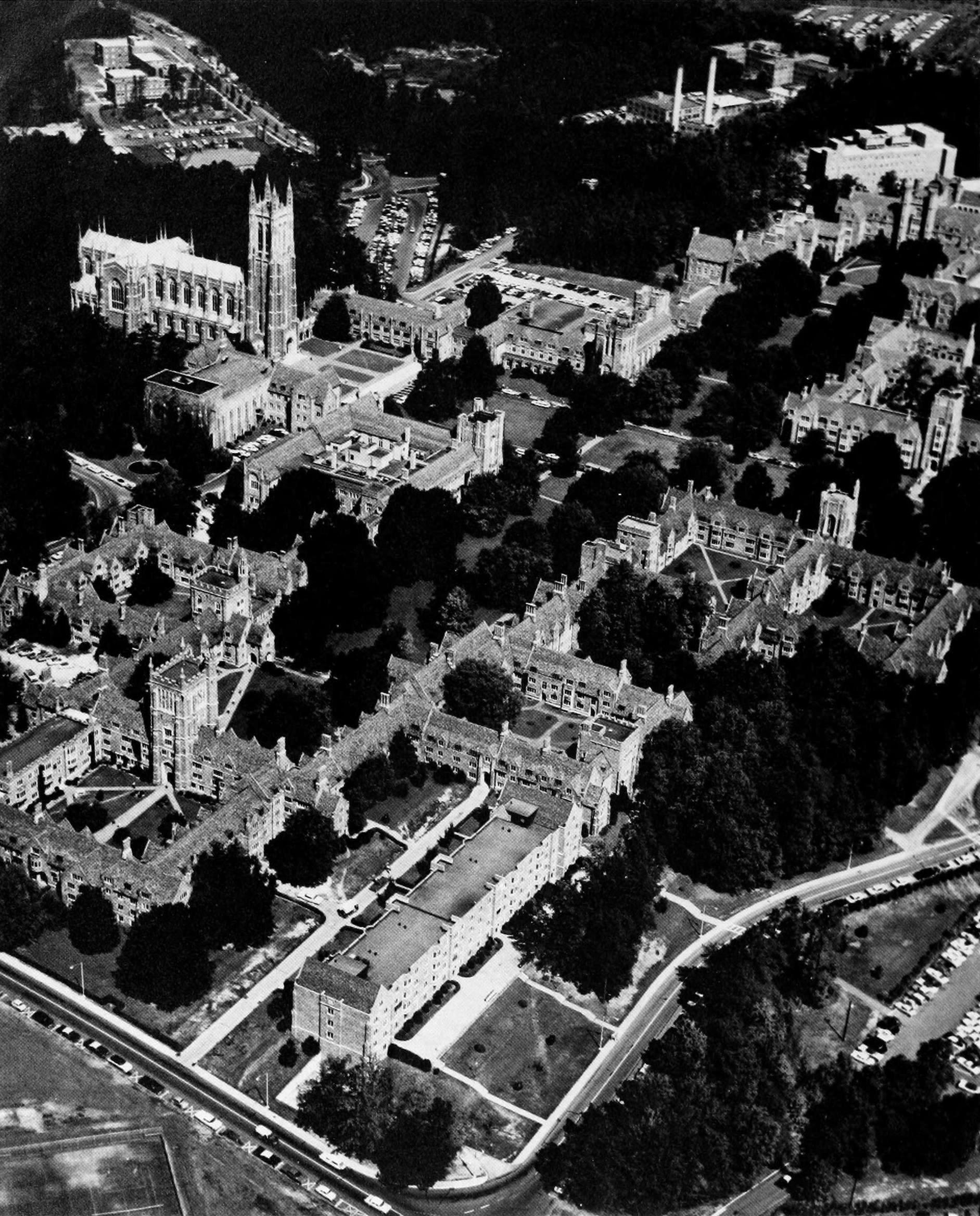
Aerial view of West Campus, c. 1976

In 1982, The Bryan Center opened with the Duke University Store, Duke Barber Shop, Duke Post Office, Restaurants, Student Government and Administrative Offices.

In 1994, Duke opened the Levine Science Research Center, to house the department of Computer Science. As of 2018, this research complex is the largest single-site interdisciplinary research facility in the United States.

By 2004, due to the University's expansion, the need for more housing on West Campus arose and the University opened the first house of what would become Keohane Quadrangle. The last house of the quadrangle was opened in 2012, with more meeting spaces and suite-style living arrangements.

2004 also marked a substantial expansion for the Pratt School of Engineering's buildings on West Campus, with the opening of the Fitzpatrick Center for Interdisciplinary Engineering.

In 2007, Bill and Melinda Gates (an alum of Duke) opened the French Family Science Center, a facility consisting of biological and genetic laboratories.

In 2015, renovations began on most of the housing on West Campus, with the Wannamaker Quadrangle becoming the first retrofitted house. In 2018, the university completed renovations of the Crowell Quadrangle, and is now renovating the Craven Quadrangle.

In 2018, as part of a university-wide construction initiative to replace aging dorms on both East Campus and West Campus, construction began on a new quadrangle.

== Undergraduate Housing ==
West Campus is organized into housing quadrangles (referred to as "quads"), which have corresponding houses. The campus serves as student housing from sophomore year through senior year, as Duke has both a residency requirement as well as guarantees housing for all undergraduate students. The Duke House Model is similar to house models at other universities such as Harvard and Yale.

=== Quadrangles ===
There are 8 undergraduate quadrangles on West Campus. The naming convention follows past presidents of Duke University.

- Craven Quadrangle (named after Duke University President Braxton Craven)
- Keohane Quadrangle (named after Duke University President Nannerl O. Keohane)
- Crowell Quadrangle (named after Duke University President John Franklin Crowell)
- Edens Quadrangle (named after Duke University President Arthur Hollis Edens)
- Kilgo Quadrangle (named after Duke University President John Carlisle Kilgo)
- Few Quadrangle (named after Duke University President William Preston Few)
- Wannamaker Quadrangle
- The Hollows Quadrangle

=== Selective Living Groups ===
Duke consists of several undergraduate "Selective Living Groups" (SLGs), which operate as an alternative to Greek Life. Each selective group has a specific theme, and is open to students who meet certain criteria.

As of 2023, the options for Duke SLGs include Wayne Manor, Brownstone, Maxwell, The Cube, LangDorm, Round Table, Mundi, and JAM!.

Greek organizations and SLGs do not have housing sections as of 2020.

== Transportation ==
The overall shape of Duke University in Durham is bar-bell shaped, with two ends of West Campus and East Campus. Duke provides regular transportation services to connect students between the two campuses (known commonly as the "C1").

== See also ==
- Duke University East Campus
- Duke University Medical Center
- Talent Identification Program
