= Talent Identification Program =

Talent Identification Program at Duke University
- Duke University; North Carolina; United States

Information
- Established: 1980
- Closed: 2020
- Information: courses and programs for gifted middle and high-school students
- Website: tip.duke.edu

The Duke University Talent Identification Program (commonly referred to as "Duke TIP") was a gifted education program based at Duke University. Founded in 1980 as one of the first pre-collegiate studies programs offered by an American university, the program aimed to identify gifted students in grades four through twelve and provide advanced educational opportunities, as well as social and emotional support. The Duke TIP program permanently ended in 2020 because of the COVID-19 pandemic.

== History ==
Duke TIP was founded in 1980 by a grant from the Duke Endowment. At the time, the goal of the program was to identify and provide educational opportunities to help the children reach their full educational potential. The program initially focused on seventh graders, and later expanded to grades four through twelve, allowing the program full reach of middle and high school students.

Due to COVID pandemic disruptions, in 2020 and 2021 the programs were unable to run. As a result the TIP Summer Studies program and the Academic Talent Search were permanently cancelled. Beginning in 2022, all pre-college students were directed to Duke's Continuing Studies program.

Across its 40 years of operation, the program benefited over 3 million students, with over 100,000 students applying to the program each year.

== Facilities and Partnering Universities ==
Following the program's inception in 1980, Duke University added additional programming locations. Within Duke University, students could attend at the main university campus in Durham, North Carolina or at the Duke Marine Laboratory in Beaufort, North Carolina. Programs were also offered at:

- Rice University
- Wake Forest University
- Georgia Tech
- Davidson College
- Trinity University
- Austin College
- Rollins College
- Appalachian State University
- Louisiana State University
- The University of Georgia
- Belmont University
- Agnes Scott College
- Eckerd College
- Meredith College
- Southwestern University
- New College of Florida
- University of Kansas
- Pisgah Astronomical Research Institute

== Programs ==
TIP offered a variety of programs. There were two talent searches—the 4th–6th Grade Talent Search and the 7th Grade Talent Search—that provided above-grade-level testing, enrichment activities, specialized publications, and other benefits.

There were also in-person and online educational programs available, taking place both during and off the school year, including:

- Summer Studies (grades 7–10)
- Field Studies (grades 9–12)
- CRISIS (grades 5–6)
- eStudies (grades 7–11)
- Scholar Weekends (grades 7–11)
- Academic Adventures (grades 4–6)
- eInvestigators (grades 4–6)

== Eligibility ==
In most cases, eligibility for TIP's talent searches were determined by grade-level test scores. Students had to score at or above the 95th percentile on national standardized achievement, abilities tests, or state assessments, or 125+ on an IQ test.

Some of TIP's educational programs had additional score requirements. Summer Studies and eStudies both required qualifying scores on the SAT or ACT.

== See also ==
- Education Program for Gifted Youth, Stanford University
- Center for Talented Youth, Johns Hopkins University
