= Douglas Knight =

American academic

Douglas Maitland Knight
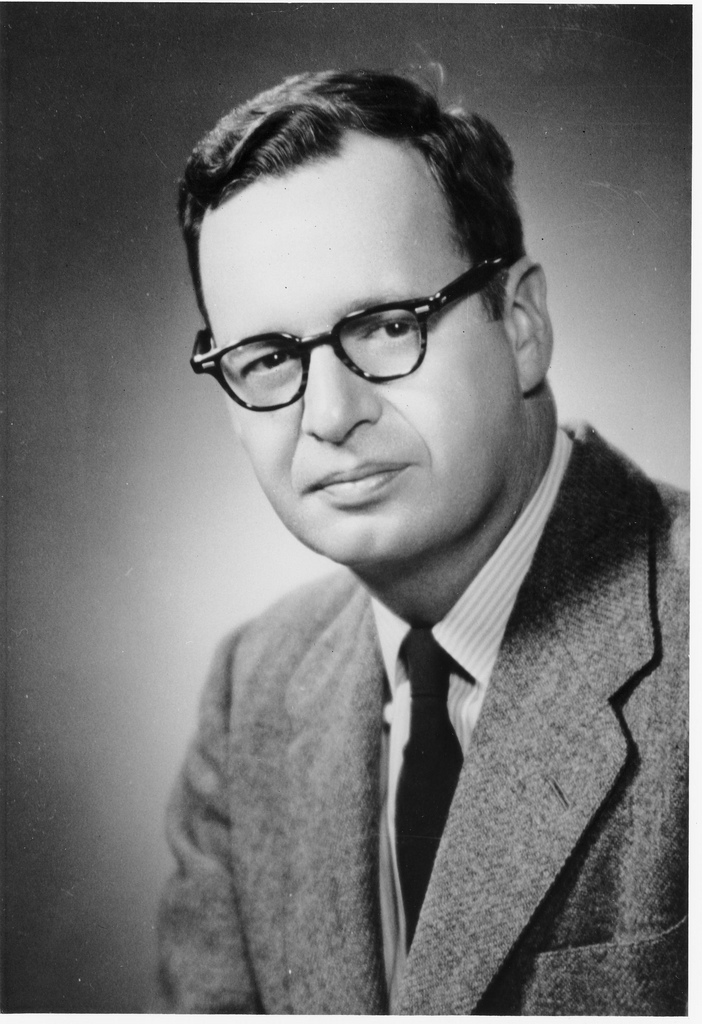

5th President of Duke University
- In office January 1, 1964 – June 30, 1969
- Preceded by: Julian Deryl Hart
- Succeeded by: Terry Sanford

President of Lawrence College
- In office 1954–1963
- Preceded by: Nathan M. Pusey
- Succeeded by: Curtis William Tarr

Personal details
- Born: June 8, 1921 Cambridge, Massachusetts
- Died: January 23, 2005 (aged 83) Doylestown, Pennsylvania
- Spouse: Grace Nicholas
- Education: Yale University

Douglas Maitland Knight (June 8, 1921 – January 23, 2005) was an American educator, businessman, and author. He was a former professor of literature at Yale University prior to his presidency at Lawrence College from 1954 to 1963. Stemming from his work at Lawrence College was his subsequent term as president of Duke University, where he served until he resigned in 1969 following student protests and the takeover of the university's main administrative building by students calling for a black cultural center and African-American studies program, among other demands. Controversy over these issues led to his transition into the business world at RCA and Questar Corporation. Knight never fully retired, and was known to consult for Questar's board of trustees years after his departure.

== Early life and education ==
Douglas Maitland Knight was born in Cambridge, Massachusetts. He attended Yale University in 1938 and earned all three of his degrees in English there: his B.A. in 1942, his M.A. in 1944, and finally his Ph.D. in 1946. After completing his doctoral studies, Knight remained at Yale undertaking research and would eventually make tenure. Knight was particularly interested in Alexander Pope, the great 18th-century poet and translator of Homer. Knight studied Pope's use of the heroic couplet and his translations of Homer's Illiad and Odyssey. In one work, Knight compared Pope to Homer and found that Pope was more a student of Homer's than he was a mere translator. Dr. Knight also received 12 honorary degrees from colleges and universities throughout the country, including degrees from both of his former homes, Lawrence College and Duke University, as well as institutions such as Knox College and the University of North Carolina at Chapel Hill.

== Presidency at Lawrence College ==
In 1954, 32-year-old Knight was chosen to succeed Dr. Nathan M. Pusey as the president of Lawrence College. At the time, Knight was the youngest college president in the nation. For the next nine years, Knight would leave what would later be called his "Midas touch" all over Lawrence College's 48-acre campus, eventually attracting the attention of Duke University's nationwide search for a new president. During Knight's office, Lawrence saw a 100% increase in the book value of the physical plant and a 150% increase in the value of the endowment. Faculty salaries were doubled and the curricular structure was revolutionized to create a "three-term, three-course plan". Knight impacted Lawrence College in a hugely positive way during his stay there, but would go on to experience more controversial success at Duke University.

== Presidency at Duke University ==
On January 1, 1964, Knight assumed his duties as president of Duke University. One of the first actions Knight took as president was the creation of the Fifth Decade Program. The Fifth Decade Program was a ten-year plan to expand educational and research programs, strengthen the faculty, and upgrade the physical plant.

=== The Duke Vigil ===
The Duke Vigil was a weeklong silent demonstration that began on April 5, 1968, following the assassination of Dr. Martin Luther King, Jr. 450 students marched 3 miles to Dr. Knight's home to deliver the following list of demands for a restructuring of the university into something less threatening to African-American students:

"(1) That he [Knight] sign an advertisement to be published in the Durham Morning Herald calling for a day of mourning; (2) That he press for the $1.60 wage for University employees; (3) That he resign from the then-segregated Hope Valley Country Club; (4) That he appoint a committee of students, faculty and workers to make recommendations concerning collective bargaining and union recognition at Duke."

Knight invited students into his home and spent the entire night negotiating the terms of their demands. Knight faced criticism from the board of trustees over his "permissiveness", but weathered the storm.

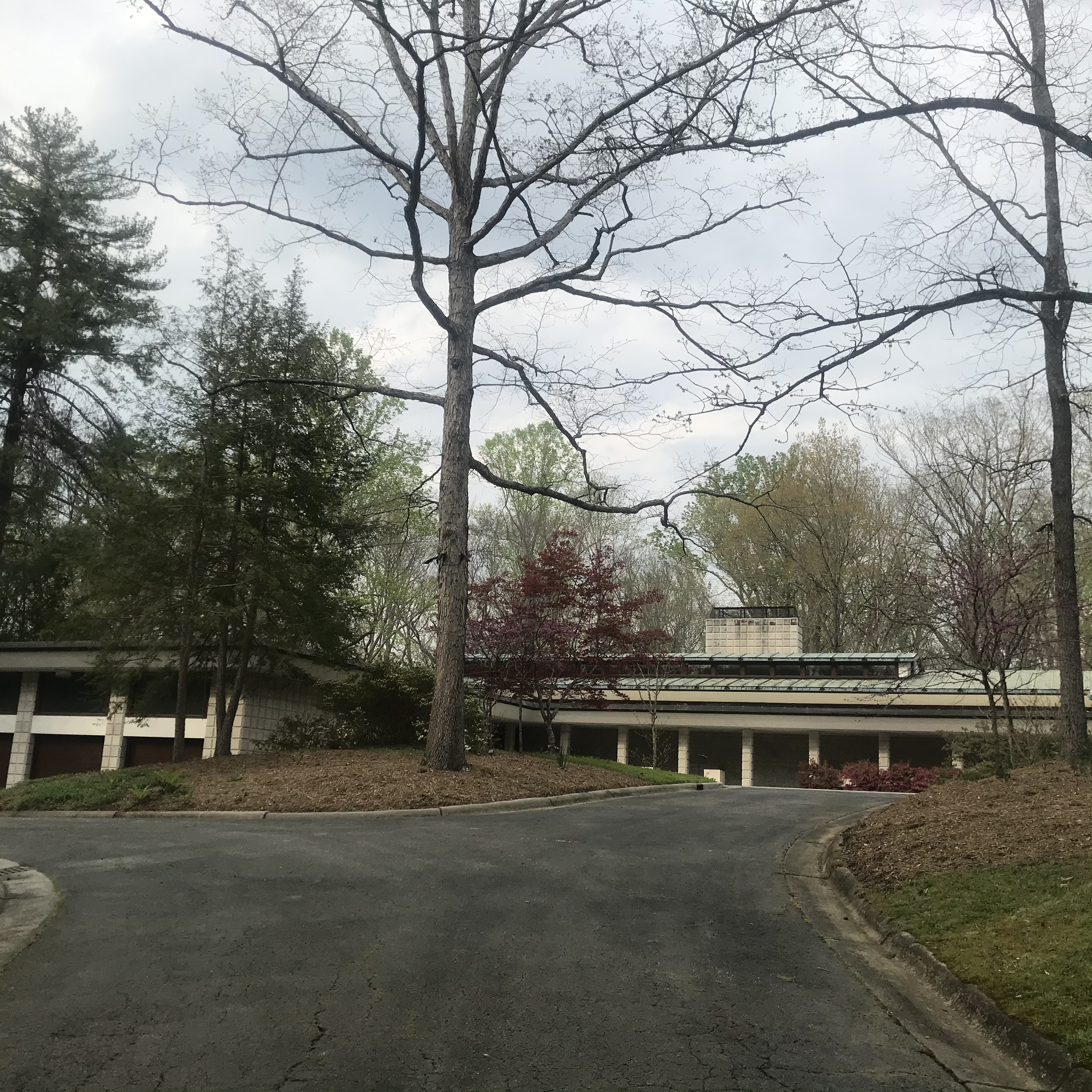
Knight's home, where 450 students marched during the Silent Vigil.

=== Takeover of the Allen Building ===
The timing of the Allen Building takeover coincided perfectly with a week-long campus event known as Black Week. In the Black Week of 1969, Duke University's own African-American paper, the Harambee, made its debut, featuring many incendiary articles on the standing of the Black students at Duke. The debut was spurred by the administration's sham "involvement" in the activities of Black Week. Neither President Knight nor his staff appeared at events celebrating African-American culture and diversity. In a statement of purpose by the editorial board of the Harambee, the paper's message as well as the message behind Chuck Hopkins's abstract letter was summarized: "Blacks believe that the blatant racism, subtle bigotry, dehumanizing effects of shallow liberalism, and the belief that a white "superior" culture is liberating the minds of Black people, generated our present mentality. Moving from this point, Blacks believe that if the university community recognizes their acts of indignation and the students' frustrations, we can solve the problem."

The majority of African-American students at Duke were of the belief, however, that discussion could do no more for their complaints. It was with this in mind that the group of seventy-some-odd students invaded the offices of the Allen Building and barricaded the doors. In their list of demands, included below in Figure 1, the "Malcolm X Liberation School," as the group referred to themselves, cited additional reasons for the takeover. Among these, two major points were the admission criteria for Black students and the rumored budget cuts to Black scholarships coming in the following Fall. Declaring that the SAT was aimed at measuring the aptitude of the white middle class and that it failed when applied to students from different socioeconomic backgrounds, the students demanded that academic achievement in high school be the sole criterion for the admission of Black students. They hoped that this would increase the number of African-American students at Duke, which at the time sat at a meager 100 students, to something more representative of the Black population of the Southeast.

The response to the Takeover differed among the three main corpora of the school's community: the students, faculty, and administration. The student body's response was largely supportive of the movement. At the time of the expiration of the administration's one-hour ultimatum to the occupants, over 2000 white students surrounded the Allen Building to protect the black students inside. These 2000 students battled the platoon of 75 police officers up and down the quad that night, enduring tear gas and baton beatings. That night, over 1500 assembled in Page Auditorium to discuss the ensuing protests and a moratorium on classes.

== National Commission on Libraries ==
Knight chaired the National Commission for Libraries appointed by President Lyndon B. Johnson. The book he co-edited based on commission work, Libraries At Large: Tradition, Innovation, and the National Interest, was the foundation for (PL 91-345) that established the National Commission on Libraries and Information Science (NCLIS).

== Departure from academia ==
After leaving Duke University, Knight shied away from other offers for administrative positions. Less than a year after his resignation, Knight took a position as vice president of educational development for RCA Corp., an American electronics company. Knight found immediate success at RCA; two years later he became the president of RCA Iran.

In 1976, Knight continued his new career in business as president of Questar Corporation, a company that manufactured high-precision lenses for astronomical, industrial, and medical applications. Knight stayed with Questar for the next three decades, coming to be the owner of the company when its previous owner Marguerite Braymer died in 1996. In 2001, Knight sold Questar to Donald Bandurick but stayed on as a consultant throughout his brief retirement.

== Authorship ==
Douglas Knight is the author of several published books as well as many other scholarly articles and letters. See the table below for a complete list of his works.

Publication date	Title of work
1951	Religious Implications in the Humanities
1951	Alexander Pope and the Heroic Tradition: A Critical Study of His Illiad
1960	The Federal Government and Higher Education
1967	Medical Ventures and the University
1969	Libraries at Large: Tradition, Innovation, and the National Interest
1971	The Dark Gate
1989	Street of Dreams: The Nature and Legacy of the 1960s
2002	The Dancer and the Dance

== Death ==
Douglas Knight died in Doylestown, Pennsylvania, on Sunday, January 23, 2005, from complications arising from pneumonia. His wife, Grace Nicholas Knight—an extraordinary woman in her own right, died in 2008. He is survived by his four sons, Christopher, Douglas Jr., Thomas, and Stephen.

Academic offices
Preceded by Nathan M. Pusey	President of Lawrence University; 1954–1963	Succeeded by Curtis William Tarr
