= Shooting of Leonna Hale =

2022 police shooting in Kansas City, Missouri

- Date: May 27, 2022; 4 years ago
- Time: 8 p.m. (CDT)
- Location: Kansas City, Missouri, U.S.
- Type: Police shooting
- Participants: Two unnamed officers, currently on administrative leave
- Injuries: Leonna Hale (Broken arm, collapsed lung, several bullet wounds)

On May 27, 2022, Leonna Hale, a 26-year old black woman, was shot five times by the Kansas City Police Department at a Family Dollar parking lot, in response to a suspected carjacking. She told officers she was pregnant before being shot.

Hale was accompanied by an unidentified male during the altercation; he later fled. Missouri State Highway Patrol said that she exited the vehicle and ran to the store's parking lot, with two officers firing at her. Hale was left seriously injured and is currently being treated under stable condition.

== Incident ==
On May 27, 2022, Kansas City police received information about an armed carjacking in the city, with Hale's vehicle matching the description. The incident occurred after 8 p.m. on a Friday. Hale was sitting inside the car at a Family Dollar parking lot. Officers suspected that the vehicle matched their description, then approached it.

A man jumped out of the vehicle during the check and ran away. The officers commanded Hale to step out of the vehicle, with a witness reporting that she had her hands in the air. Hale was told to lay on the ground; she told officers that she couldn't due to her pregnancy, according to a witness. Hale noted that there was a gun inside the vehicle. She moved backwards when officers approached her armed. She then ran, with officers shooting her five times. Hale fell to the ground after being shot and experienced significant bleeding in the parking lot. She was transported to a hospital with serious injuries.

According to court records, video surveillance from body cameras showed Hale holding a firearm and being told to drop it, with her pointing it at the officers before they shot her three times.

Two other officers chased the man, with him being apprehended and taken to a hospital due to an unknown medical reason.

The Jackson County Prosecutor's Office announced the charges against Leonna Hale. Hale, 26, is charged with unlawful possession of a firearm, unlawful use of a weapon while exhibiting in threatening manner and resisting a lawful detention. Hale also fit the description of one of the two carjackers.

== Reactions ==
A demonstration was held on June 1, 2022, at the site of her shooting. About two dozen people from the community attended, setting up workstations to raise awareness using posters and discussion. Protestors discussed whether it was justified and the immediate criminal proceedings against Hale.

Jackson County prosecutor Jean Peters Baker showed body camera footage to community stakeholders and released a still image from the footage appearing to show a woman holding a gun. Kansas City Fraternal Order of Police president Brad Lemon denied rumors that the image had been doctored, saying that the internal storage system of body cameras compresses images. Kansas City Mayor Quinton Lucas was shown the footage and said that the officers involved in the shooting had followed policy and protocol. The body camera footage was also shown to a group of seven community and religious leaders several of whom told reporters that the video addressed their concerns.

== See also ==
- Black Lives Matter
