= Nicholas School of the Environment =

Duke University Nicholas School of the Environment
- Type: Private
- Established: 1938 — School of Forestry and Environmental Studies; 1995 — Nicholas School of the Environment
- Dean: Lori Bennear
- Location: Durham, North Carolina, U.S. 36.0047°N 78.9427°W
- Website: www.nicholas.duke.edu

The Duke University Nicholas School of the Environment is one of ten graduate and professional schools at Duke University and is headquartered on Duke’s main campus in Durham, N.C. A secondary coastal facility, Duke University Marine Laboratory, is maintained in Beaufort, North Carolina. The Nicholas School is composed of three research divisions: Earth and Climate Sciences, Environmental Sciences and Policy, and Marine Science and Conservation. The current dean of the Nicholas School is Lori Bennear.

== History ==
The Nicholas School celebrates its creation date as 1991, but it represents a coming together of three entities that are almost as old as the university itself. Both formed in 1938, the School of Forestry and Environmental Studies and the Duke University Marine Laboratory came together in 1991 to become the School of Environment. Following a $20 million gift from Peter M. and Ginny Nicholas in 1995, the school was named the Nicholas School of the Environment. In 1997, the Department of Geology (formed in 1936) joined the school as the Division of Earth and Climate Sciences and focuses on a number of areas at the intersection of earth and environmental sciences.

In 2018, Toddi Steelman was named Dean of the Nicholas School. In 2023, Steelman was appointed by Duke University President Vincent Price to the newly created role of Vice Provost for Climate and Sustainability for the university. Lori Bennear has served as the Dean of the Nicholas School since July 1, 2025; she previously served in an interim capacity following Steelman's departure.

Toddi Steelman, who works with the Nicholas School of the Environment at Duke University, was named as one of Forbes' Sustainability Leaders 2025. "In her two years as Duke’s sustainability chief, Dr. Toddi Steelman helped the university reach 100% carbon neutrality in 2024."

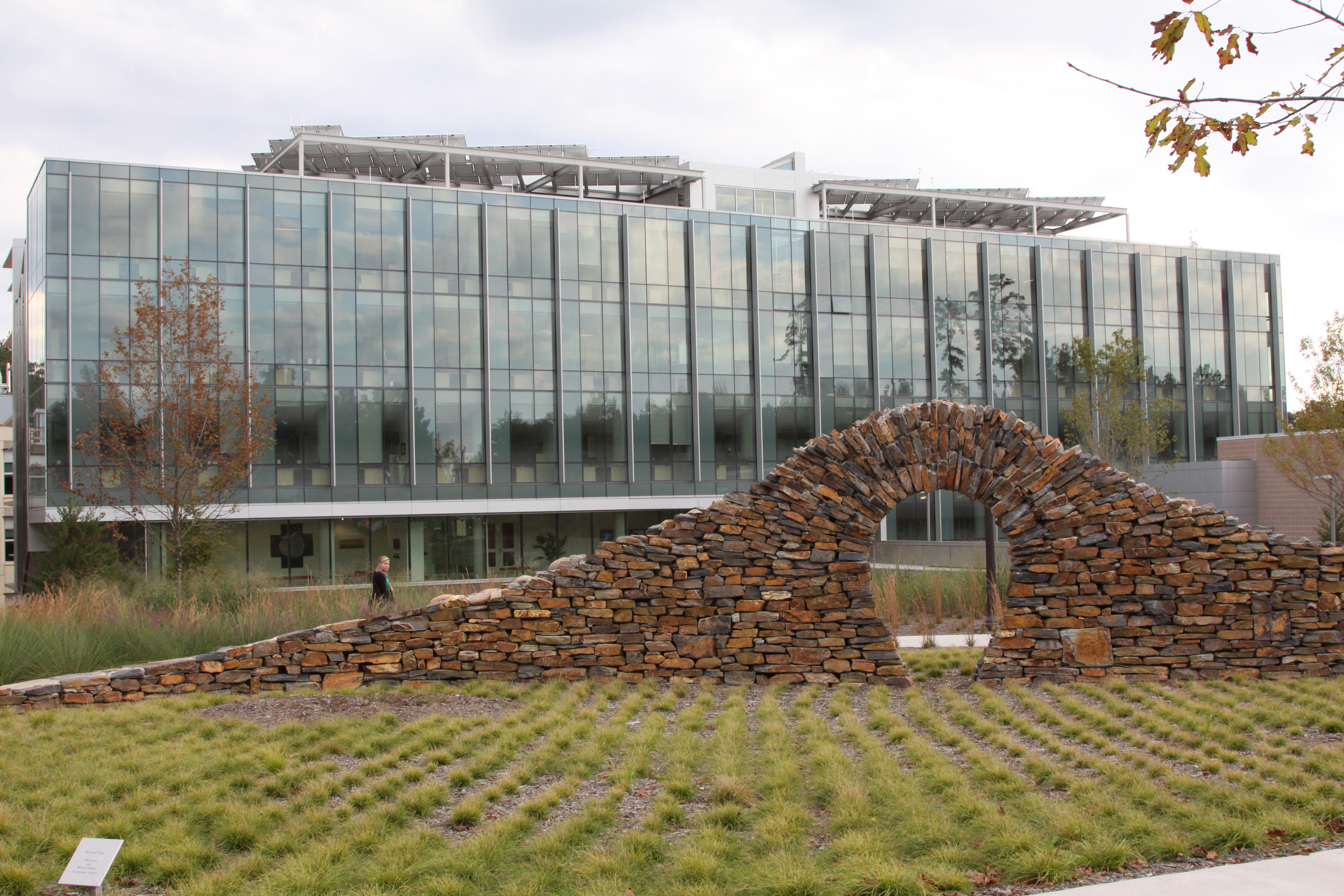
Grainger Hall

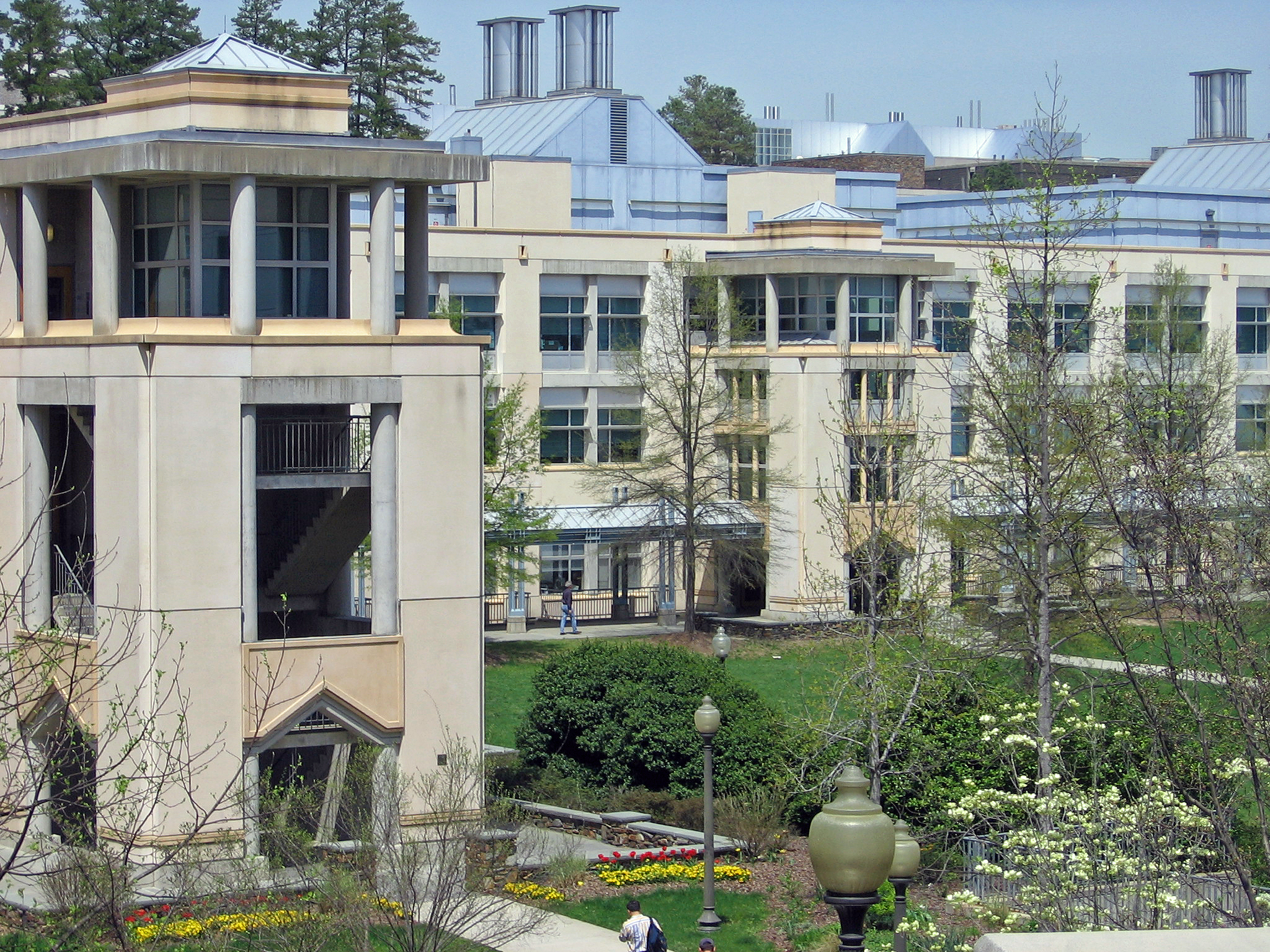
Levine Science Research Center

== School facilities and technology ==
Since 2014, the Nicholas School has been based in Grainger Hall on Duke's Durham campus. The school was previously based in the Levine Science Research Center.

=== Grainger Hall ===
Grainger Hall is a 70,000-square-foot, five-story glass-and-concrete building located on Circuit Drive on Duke’s West Campus. When the building opened in 2014, it was originally known as Environment Hall. In 2018, the building was renamed Grainger Hall in recognition of a $20 million donation from the Grainger Family Descendants Fund at The Chicago Community Trust.

The hall houses five classrooms, a 105-seat auditorium, 45 private offices, 72 open office spaces, a 32-seat computer lab, an outdoor courtyard and an environmental art gallery, as well as conference rooms, shared workrooms and common.

Grainger Hall was designed achieve a LEED Platinum Certification, the U.S. Green Building Council's highest level of sustainability certification, which it received on October 26, 2015. Green features range from rooftop solar panels and innovative climate control and water systems, to special windows that moderate light and heat, to an organic orchard and sustainably designed landscaping.

=== Levine Science Research Center ===
The Levine Science Research Center (LSRC) is an interdisciplinary research facility at Duke University. The A Wing of the LSRC is the former home of the Nicholas School and is currently undergoing renovations to house laboratories and student services oriented offices. The Division of Earth and Climate Sciences occupies renovated laboratories in the Old Chemistry building on the West Campus with plans to relocate to new space in LSRC and Grainger Hall sometime in 2019. The division maintains facilities for geochemical analysis and climate modeling studies.

=== Duke University Marine Laboratory ===
The Duke University Marine Laboratory is home to the third division of the school, the Marine Science and Conservation division. The Marine Lab is situated on Pivers Island in Beaufort, North Carolina. The current Director of the Marine Laboratory is Andrew J Read.

=== Duke Forest ===
The Nicholas School uses the Duke Forest, established in 1931 and spanning 7,060 acres, for teaching and research purposes.

== Degree programs ==
As of 2018, the Nicholas School provides educational opportunities for students at the doctoral level (Ph.D.), graduate professional level (Master of Environmental Management and Master of Forestry), and undergraduate level (B.S. and A.B.).

Doctoral Programs: Earth and Climate Science, Environment, Marine Science & Conservation, University Program in Ecology, University Program in Environmental Health and Toxicology, University Program in Environmental Policy

Master's Programs: Master of Environmental Management, Master of Forestry, Duke Environmental Leadership - Master of Environmental Management

Master's Programs: International Master of Environmental Policy at Duke Kunshan University

Undergraduate Programs: Earth & Climate Sciences, Environmental Sciences | Environmental Sciences & Policy Programs, Marine Science & Conservation

Joint degree programs with Duke University School of Law, Fuqua School of Business, and Sanford School of Public Policy are also available to enrolled students at the Nicholas School. Other concurrent degree programs include the Master of Arts in Teaching (MA) administered through the Graduate School of Duke University, Master of Engineering Management Program (MEMP) at the Pratt School of Engineering, and selected graduate degrees offered at the University of North Carolina at Chapel Hill.

== Notable people ==
=== Alumni ===
- Sandra Postel (MEM, 1980), founding director of the Global Water Policy Project and 2021 Stockholm Water Prize laureate

=== Faculty ===
- Emily Bernhardt
- William L. Chameides (former Dean)
- Jay Golden
- Orrin Pilkey
- Stuart Pimm
- Lincoln Pratson
- William H. Schlesinger (former Dean)
- Drew Shindell
- Heather Stapleton
- Cindy Lee Van Dover
- Erika Weinthal
