= Howard Levine =

Howard Levine may refer to:

- Howard R. Levine (born 1958), American businessman associated with the Family Dollar retail chain
- Howard Levine (politician) (born 1947), Canadian politician on Toronto City Council, 1988–1994
- Howard A. Levine (born 1932), American lawyer and jurist
