= Sapphire (wrestler) =

American professional wrestler and valet (1934–1996)

- Born: Juanita Wright; October 24, 1938; St. Louis, Missouri, U.S.
- Died: September 11, 1996 (aged 57); St. Louis, Missouri, U.S.
- Professional wrestling career
- Ring name(s): Sapphire; Sweet Sapphire; Princess Dark Cloud
- Billed height: 5 ft 2 in (1.57 m)
- Billed weight: 155 lb (70 kg; 11.1 st)
- Debut: 1976
- Retired: 1996

Juanita Wright (October 24, 1938 – September 11, 1996) was an American professional wrestler and valet best known as "Sweet" Sapphire in the World Wrestling Federation where she managed Dusty Rhodes in 1989 and 1990. She also wrestled on the independent circuit as Princess Dark Cloud.

== Early life ==
Juanita Wright was born on October 24, 1938, in St. Louis, Missouri. She became a huge wrestling fan as a child and began to drive wrestlers to arenas in the St. Louis area. Wright earned a wrestling referee's license, the first woman in Missouri to do so, before entering the ring as a wrestler at the age of 38, also becoming the first person of the state to participate in a Men's Battle Royale bout. She and another opponent were declared the winners after they were the last two left in the ring out of 15 other wrestlers. She appeared under the name Princess Dark Cloud and once wrestled a bear. Prior to signing a contract with the World Wrestling Federation, Wright worked as a saleswoman for a clothing company in St. Louis.

== Professional wrestling career ==
=== World Wrestling Federation (1989–1990) ===
On November 23, 1989, Wright made her Pay-Per View debut at Survivor Series as a fan cheering on Dusty Rhodes who was a part of the Dream Team against The Enforcers. Her WWF television debut occurred one week prior, however, during an episode of Prime Time wrestling, where she was also seen as a fan cheering on Dusty Rhodes during his match against Akeem.

Sapphire began to manage Dusty Rhodes, both adorned in black outfits with yellow polka dots. She along with Rhodes later on entered into a feud with "Macho Man" Randy Savage then referred to as "Macho King" and Sensational Sherri then Queen Sherri as Sapphire teamed with Rhodes to take on Savage and Sherri in a tag team match at Wrestlemania VI. Sapphire pinned Sherri, with some help from Miss Elizabeth, who had allied herself with Sapphire and Rhodes after a previous incident that precipitated the match. Sapphire and Sherri would continue their feud competing against each other in singles and tag team matches, across the country from April 21, 1990, at the Richmond Coliseum where she lost to Sherri in a one-on-one match, up until August 25, where she and Rhodes emerged victorious as a team.

In the spring and summer of 1990, she began to receive gifts from a mysterious benefactor. At SummerSlam, Sherri defeated Sapphire via forfeit after Sapphire failed to show. When Sapphire was found after a brief period of searching, she quickly ran into a dressing room and locked the door, refusing to be interviewed or even speak to Rhodes. Seconds before Rhodes' match against Savage, Ted DiBiase revealed that he had bought Sapphire. A distraught Rhodes lost a quick match to Savage after being hit with Sherri's purse behind the referee's back. Sapphire began appearing in segments where she would do favors for DiBiase, including ironing his money. She left the WWF a short time later. Although it was never explained why on WWF programming, Virgil revealed in an interview with WWF Magazine several months later that the (kayfabe) reason for her leaving was that DiBiase took all the gifts back.

In a later shoot interview, Sherri Martel revealed that Wright's admiration for Rhodes was legitimate, and that she broke down crying when the office told her that they were severing her and Rhodes' on-screen partnership. Martel believed that Wright lost complete interest in the wrestling business after this, which is why she left the company not long after SummerSlam. Sherri also recalled making Wright cry by yelling at her for not doing a basic maneuver properly during their training sessions. Also recalling another instance in training, Wright accidentally smashed Martel in the nose, where Sherri proceeded to make her cry. According to friends, Wright enjoyed the time she spent with the WWF, and would constantly receive autograph requests years after her character disappeared.

=== United States Wrestling Association (1993) ===
Wright was later brought into the United States Wrestling Association (USWA) for a brief period of time in 1993, participating in a feud featuring Jerry Lawler and Bert Prentice.

== Personal life and death ==
Wright had two children, named Wanda and Ricco. Little is known about Juanita from the time she left the WWF except that she worked at GrandPa Pidgeon's in University City, Missouri, where she enjoyed telling old wrestling stories to her co-workers' children. She died in St. Louis, Missouri from a heart attack on September 11, 1996, at the age of 57.

== In popular culture ==
A character called "Sweet Sapphire" was adopted by Earl Douglas, a radio producer for XM Radio's Ron and Fez Show due to his uncanny resemblance to Juanita, and his pairing with the new show producer The Midnight Rider, portrayed by East Side Dave. Dusty Rhodes, whom Sapphire had managed in the WWF, had wrestled under the name The Midnight Rider during his days on Jim Crockett Promotions.

== See also ==
- List of premature professional wrestling deaths
