= Pratson =

Pratson may refer to:

- Frederick Pratson (1935-1989), a historian and writer of travel guides
- Lincoln Pratson, an American geologist currently the Truman and Nellie Semans/Alex Brown & Sons Professor of Earth and Ocean Sciences at Duke University
