= LSRC =

LSRC may refer to:

- Levine Science Research Center, a facility at Duke University
- Lake State Railway, a railroad in Michigan
