= Deals =

American chain of discount variety stores owned by Dollar Tree

Deal$
- Company type: Subsidiary
- Industry: Retail, Variety,
- Founded: November 1999 in Bridgeton, Missouri
- Founder: Tom Holley
- Defunct: March 1, 2016
- Fate: Acquired and re-branded by Dollar Tree
- Headquarters: Chesapeake, Virginia, United States
- Number of locations: 221 (2015/16)
- Area served: United States
- Products: Health and beauty, food and snacks, party, seasonal décor, housewares, glassware, dinnerware, household cleaning supplies, candy, toys, gifts, gift bags and wrap, stationery, craft supplies, teaching supplies, books, frozen foods and dairy.
- Parent: Independent (1999-2002); SuperValu (2002–2006); Dollar Tree (2006–2016)
- Website: Deals-Stores.com (redirects to dollartree.com)

Deals (previously stylized as DEAL$) was a chain of discount variety stores owned by Dollar Tree. The chain operated more than 221 stores located in shopping centers, malls (until 2015), and urban areas in 19 states throughout the United States.

Each store stocked a variety of products including national, regional, and private-label brands, and accepted manufacturers' coupons. Departments found in a Deals store included health and beauty, food and snacks, party, seasonal décor, housewares, glassware, dinnerware, household cleaning supplies, candy, toys, gifts, gift bags and wrap, stationery, craft supplies, teaching supplies, and books. The majority of Deals stores also sold frozen foods and dairy items such as milk, eggs, pizza, ice cream, frozen dinners, and pre-made baked goods.

== History ==
Deal$ logo, used from the 2006 acquisition until 2013.

Tom Holley owned the local Grandpa's chain in St. Louis, which he sold in November 1999 to Value City so he could open additional Deal$ stores after the first few proved successful. It eventually evolved into a chain of 41 discount dollar stores located from Missouri to Ohio. Later acquired by SuperValu on May 20, 2002, Deal$ had grown to 53 stores. And finally by March 29, 2006, Dollar Tree, Inc. acquired all Deal$ stores from SuperValu Inc, now 138 outlets.

On March 1, 2016, Dollar Tree converted most of the company's Deals stores into Dollar Tree stores. The conversion was done due to the parent company's acquisition of Family Dollar. The remaining 5 Deals stores were converted to Family Dollar stores.

Since 2018, some Dollar Tree stores previously known as Deals locations, many located in the Northern United States, closed down.

== Website ==
In 2013, Deals launched a full e-commerce website, deals-stores.com, to sell merchandise in both single items and larger quantities to individuals, small businesses, and organizations. The website was also used to advertise in-store events, specials, seasonal promotions, and featured products. As a part of its re-branding in 2016, it now redirects to Dollar Tree's website.
