= William L. Chameides =

American scientist

- Born: November 21, 1949 (age 76); New York City
- Education: Binghamton University, Yale University
- Known for: Global warming activism
- Spouse: Yes
- Children: Four sons (though one is deceased) and four grandchildren
- Awards: James B. MacElwane Medal from the American Geophysical Union (1983)
- Scientific career
- Fields: Atmospheric science
- Workplaces: Nicholas School of the Environment, Duke University
- Thesis: A photochemical theory of tropospheric ozone (1974)
- Doctoral advisor: J.C.G. Walker

William Lloyd "Bill" Chameides (born November 21, 1949, in New York City) is an American atmospheric scientist and was the dean of Duke University's Nicholas School of the Environment from 2007 until July 1, 2014. He is an ISI highly cited researcher, as well as a member of the National Academy of Sciences and a fellow of the American Geophysical Union.

In December 2013, Chameides announced that he would be stepping down from his position at Duke the following June, saying that he "feels comfortable stepping down now given that he has accomplished many of his initial goals." He was replaced by Alan Townsend on July 1, but remains a member of the Nicholas School faculty.

== Education and scientific career ==
Chameides, a native of New York City, originally wanted to be a lawyer at the time he went to college. However, he later changed his major, first to physics and then to atmospheric science, as a result of taking an undergraduate physics course. He received a bachelor's degree from Binghamton University in 1970, a Master of philosophy degree from Yale University in 1973, and a PhD in 1974, also from Yale.

He then began postdoctoral research at the University of Michigan, where he conducted research with Ralph J. Cicerone. After completing this research, he spent 25 years at the Georgia Institute of Technology, where he eventually became the chairman of the department of atmospheric sciences.

While an associate professor there, he was the editor-in-chief of the Journal of Geophysical Research from 1985 to 1989, and, five years later, was the lead author on a study in Science which reported that ozone from photochemical smog may significantly reduce global food production. In the study, Chameides et al. wrote that about 60% of smog is produced in North America, Europe, China, and Japan, which also produce about 60% of the global food supply.

In 1998, Chameides was elected into the National Academy of Sciences, becoming the second Georgia Tech professor in the university's history to be so honored (the first was Mostafa El-Sayed in 1980). In 2005, he left Georgia Tech to become the chief scientist at the Environmental Defense Fund, a decision that Virginia Gewin referred to as "unorthodox." Chameides said he made this decision because he wanted to "...do more to advance the cause of good environmental stewardship."

In 2011, Chameides was the vice-chair of a report issued by the United States National Research Council entitled "America's Climate Choices."

== Public advocacy ==
Chameides has been active in highlighting the dangers of global warming, and has testified before the U.S. House of Representatives' Committee on Science, Space and Technology on the matter. In his testimony, delivered on April 25, 2013, he said that global warming is occurring, is primarily caused by human activity, and that it will have many negative effects on the United States, including, but not limited to, "more intense and frequent heat waves, risks to coastal communities from sea level rise, greater drying of the arid Southwest, and increased public health risks."

He currently runs a blog on the Nicholas School of the Environment website called "The Green Grok," and has also blogged about global warming and other environmental issues on the Huffington Post and for Popular Science. Chameides has also written about the economics of climate change mitigation for both Science and for The Guardian.

Additionally, after Joe Bastardi claimed on Fox News Channel that carbon dioxide can't cause global warming because of the first law of thermodynamics and Le Chatelier's principle, Media Matters for America contacted Chameides by email, who referred to Bastardi's claims as "utter nonsense." He has also, along with Alan Leshner, criticized the North Carolina government's proposal of a law in response to a report stating that sea levels were projected to rise about 39 inches over the next century. In an article for the News & Observer, they accused the law's supporters of trying to "disregard projections of sea level rise" and trying to "outlaw climate change." The law, which would prevent the government from using sea-level data based on anything except "historical data" for the next four years, was passed despite Chameides' objections.

He has also criticized the cash for clunkers program by pointing out that, while one of its goals is to decrease CO_{2} emissions by promoting the purchase of more fuel-efficient cars, manufacturing new cars results in the production of carbon dioxide—he puts the figure at between 3 and 12 tons per car. He has also calculated that trading in a clunker that gets 18 mpg for a new car that gets 22 mpg would necessitate 5 and a half years of typical driving to offset the car's carbon footprint.

Chameides has also written about other environmental issues, like chemicals used in certain consumer products. For example, when interviewed by the Taipei Times about the safety of optical brighteners in laundry detergent, he said that scientific studies on the topic have been "inconclusive."
