= Jack Murdock (actor) =

American actor (1922–2001)

- Born: October 28, 1922; Urbana, Ohio, U.S.
- Died: April 27, 2001 (aged 78); Burbank, California, U.S.
- Occupation: Actor
- Years active: 1953–1998

Jack Murdock (October 28, 1922 – April 27, 2001) was an American actor.

He was born in Urbana, Ohio to performer parents. His father had a vaudeville group called Teck Murdock and Company; his mother and her sister had an act called The Kennedy Sisters. The two acts combined as Teck Murdock and the Kennedy sisters. He lived with an aunt and uncle in Put-in-Bay in South Bass Island.

Murdock enlisted in the U.S. Navy after he graduated from high school; he served as a gunner's mate in the north Atlantic. After the end of World War II, Murdock, who intended to study law, earned a bachelor's degree in speech from the Ohio State University in Columbus.

== Career ==
=== Ohio ===
Murdock was a director WBNS-TV in Columbus. He hosted an afternoon show with Jonathan Winters.

=== St. Louis ===
Murdock came to the St. Louis, Missouri area in 1953 to serve as director and star of Coffee Break, a morning program on WTVI in Belleville, Illinois. He cowrote and costarred in Hiram and Sneed. He started as the host of Apartment Eleven, an interview show, on KPLR in St. Louis in 1960.

Another role was as Kronos, the host of the television show Zone 2 on KTVI from August 1965 to August 1966. The show was named Zone 2 because KTVI-TV (the local ABC affiliate at the time) broadcast on Channel 2. It aired low-budget science fiction and horror movies. It aired at 3:30 p.m.–5:30 p.m. The movies shown were severely edited to fit into the time slot, to make room for commercials, and to allow for Kronos to introduce each segment.

He hosted the local KTVI-TV presentation of Adventures of Superman in 1962, appearing as Mr. Willoughby on a program called Treehouse Time. Mr. Willoughby lived in a treehouse and introduced Superman and a cartoon from there. The show was 45 minutes long, leaving 15 minutes for local news at the head of the hour.

Murdock was active in theatre productions in the St. Louis area, including at The Muny and at the old Crystal Palace in Gaslight Square.

He served as master of ceremonies at the St. Louis bicentennial activities center dedication in 1964.

Murdock was also familiar to St. Louis television viewers as the personification of "Grandpa Pidgeon" on commercials for the GrandPa's chain of 15 discount retail stores in the St. Louis area.

=== New York ===
Murdock left St. Louis in 1968 to pursue a career on Broadway. He lived in Glen Rock, New Jersey but frequently toured the United States in theatre productions.

=== Hollywood ===
Murdock and his wife moved to Los Angeles. He appeared in 50 films between 1973 and 1998.

Murdock appeared in Big Top Pee-Wee with New York City natives Albert Henderson and David Byrd.

== Later life ==
Murdock had a wife, Bette Graf, and two children: Teck and Christine.

He died in Burbank, California of emphysema at age seventy-eight. His remains were cremated.

== Filmography ==
Year	Title	Role	Notes
1974	The Crazy World of Julius Vrooder	Millard	
1976	Moving Violation	Bubba	
1980	Any Which Way You Can	Little Melvin	
1980	Altered States	Hector Orteco	
1981	Cutter's Way	Concession Owner	
1981	Honky Tonk Freeway	Rhino Wrangler	
1983	Blue Thunder	Kress	
1983	Sweetwater	Cleary	
1986	Psycho III	Lou	
1988	Big Top Pee-wee	Otis	
1988	Rain Man	John Mooney	
1989	Gross Anatomy	Old Man Patient	
1990	False Identity	Hayes	
1991	Dutch	Homeless Man	
1992	Mission of Justice	Mr. Schenk	
