= Heather Stapleton =

American environmental organic chemist

- Born: New York, USA

Academic background
- Education: BS, 1997, Long Island University; MA, 2000, PhD, 2003, University of Maryland, College Park
- Thesis: Assimilation and metabolism of polybrominated diphenyl ethers by the common Carp (2003)

Heather M. Stapleton is an American environmental organic chemist and exposure scientist. She is the Ronie-Richele Garcia-Johnson Distinguished Professor at Duke University's Nicholas School of the Environment. During her tenure at Duke, Stapleton focused her research on identifying and understanding the uses of flame retardant chemicals in consumer products and evaluating the health impacts of exposures to those chemicals.

== Early life and education ==
Stapleton was born to parents Donald and Kathleen Stapleton and grew up in Candor, New York. She graduated from Candor Central High School in 1992 as class valedictorian and member of the varsity volleyball, basketball and softball team. Stapleton originally aspired to be a marine biologist and enrolled in a marine science program in college. She completed her Bachelor of Science degree from Long Island University in 1997 and earned her master's degree and PhD from the University of Maryland, College Park.

== Career ==
As an assistant professor of environmental sciences and policy, Stapleton focused on determining the underlying factors influencing exposure and accumulation of contaminants in aquatic organisms. She specifically examined the consequences of when chemicals used to prevent fires in common household products get into rivers, lakes and other water systems. In 2008, Stapleton was awarded an Outstanding New Environmental Scientist Award from the National Institute of Environmental Health Sciences for her research grant proposal entitled "Children’s Exposure to Brominated Flame Retardants: Effects on Thyroid Hormone Regulation." Stapleton culminated her research into her 2011 study Identification of Flame Retardants in Polyurethane Foam Collected from Baby Products which examined levels of flame retardant chemicals in infant and toddler products. It was later selected as the top scientific paper of 2011 by the journal Environmental Science & Technology. Stapleton was also selected as a Science Communication Fellow at Environmental Health Science.

In 2014, Stapleton and colleague Greg Lowry qualified for the 2014 list of Highly Cited Researchers published by Thomson Reuters. Within two years Stapleton was promoted to Dan and Bunny Gabel Associate Professor of Environmental Ethics and Sustainable Environmental Management and associate professor of civil and environmental engineering. She was also recognized again on Thomson Reuter's Highly Cited Researchers for 2015 list.

During her later tenure at Duke, Stapleton focused her research on identifying and understanding the uses of flame retardant chemicals in consumer products and evaluating the health impacts of exposures to those chemicals. In 2017, Stapleton reported that toddlers’ urine had 15 times higher flame retardant concentrations than their mothers'. Later, her research team published a study that found that urine concentrations of one type of flame retardant increased along with the number of baby products at home. In 2019, Stapleton received a five-year, $5 million grant from the National Institute of Environmental Health Sciences to develop a new environmental analysis laboratory. She was also appointed to the North Carolina Thyroid Cancer Research Advisory Panel.

Upon the laboratories establishment in 2020, Stapleton was named its co-director and appointed the Ronie-Richele Garcia-Johnson Distinguished Professor.
