= Leon Levine =

American businessman and philanthropist (1937–2023)

- Born: June 8, 1937; Wadesboro, North Carolina, U.S.
- Died: April 5, 2023 (aged 85); Charlotte, North Carolina, U.S.
- Occupation: Businessman
- Known for: Co-founder of Family Dollar
- Spouses: Barbara Leven (m. 1958; died 1966); Sandra Poliakoff (m. 1978)
- Children: 4, including Howard R.

Leon Levine (June 8, 1937 – April 5, 2023) was an American businessman and philanthropist who founded Family Dollar. He resided in Charlotte, North Carolina.

== Early life ==
Leon Levine was born into a Jewish family on June 8, 1937, in Wadesboro, North Carolina. The family actually lived in Rockingham, North Carolina, but that town, some 19 miles away from Wadesboro, had no hospital at that time. The family operated a small town store called The Hub, managed by his brother Sherman and his mother until its closure in 1960.

In 1949, when Leon was 12, his father died from a heart attack; that loss led him to become closer to his mother than before. In 1951, Sherman was drafted by the U. S. Army to fight in the Korean War, requiring Leon to assume his responsibilities at the store. This necessitated him to attend school only during the morning hours, while working in the afternoon, something permitted by North Carolina law then.

== Career ==
In 1956, Leon and Sherman purchased a Chenille bedspread factory in Wingate, North Carolina. Much like he did during high school, Leon attended nearby Wingate College during the morning so he could manage the factory for the rest of the day. After a discouraging sales trip to New York, Leon nonetheless persisted and was able to develop a market for his bedspreads in Puerto Rico. In 1958, Levine, realizing he would have to make a major capital investment in new equipment in order to stay competitive, sold the company.

In 1959 he visited a store in Kentucky that sold nothing costing more than a dollar. He liked the simple concept and in November 1959, at age 22, he opened a similar store in the 1500 block of Central Avenue in Charlotte, North Carolina, a place that sold items with a $2 ($21 in 2023 money) maximum price. He named it Family Dollar for the affordability of its merchandise and the demographic that it was aimed towards. Levine capitalized Family Dollar with $3,000 ($31,014 in 2023 money) of his own money and $3,000 from a partner.

In June 1960, Levine opened a second store, also in Charlotte, next door to a Park 'n Shop store on Wilkinson Boulevard. Later that year he opened a third store in Charlotte, followed by another one, in Hamlet, North Carolina. That same year, due to inflation, he realized that the $2 price cap was not feasible, and he increased it to $3 ($30 in 2023 money), a ceiling he kept until 1972. The company grew rapidly; by 1961, Family Dollar had expanded into neighboring South Carolina. In 1962, Family Dollar did some $2 million ($19.9 million in 2023 money) in business, and moved into the Augusta, Georgia market. Around this time, Levine went solo, buying out his partner's interest in the company. By the end of 1979 Family Dollar had 380 stores in eight states.

In 1974, Family Dollar moved its administrative and warehouse space to a newly built facility in Matthews, North Carolina. In 1970, Levine decided to put Family Dollar public on the stock exchange. Two years later, Family Dollar's common stock began trading on the American Stock Exchange.

== Personal life ==
During a summer vacation to Florida in 1957, Levine met Barbara Leven, who lived in Chicago; they married in February 1958. Their three children were Howard Russel, born on Christmas Day 1958; Lori Ann, born in December 1960; and Mindy Ellen, born in August 1963. Barbara died in 1966 from breast cancer; Mindy died by suicide in 1988.

Twelve years after his first wife died, on June 5, 1978, Levine married Sandra Poliakoff. They had met in the 1960s while Sandra was friends with his first wife, Barbara. After some years of having lost touch, he renewed his friendship with her in 1975. Their daughter, Amy, was born in June 1981. Levine and Poliakoff had been involved in numerous charitable and philanthropic causes. She has served on the board of commissioners of the Carolinas Healthcare System. The couple had 10 grandchildren. He was a member of the North Carolina Business Hall of Fame and belonged to Charlotte's Temple Israel, which named its social hall after him.

In 2003, he retired as chairman and CEO of Family Dollar. He was succeeded by his son, Howard, who served until January 2016.

Levine started The Leon Levine Foundation, which aims to improve the general welfare throughout the Carolinas. The organization invests in nonprofit organizations that have strong leadership, a successful track record, and a focus on sustainability in the areas of health care, education, Jewish values and human services. Leon and Sandra were members of the Board of Directors, serving as President and Vice-President, respectively.

== Death ==
Levine died of natural causes in Charlotte on April 5, 2023, at the age of 85.

== Philanthropy ==
- Queens University of Charlotte: Queens
- University of North Carolina at Charlotte: Levine Scholars Program
- The Levine Center at Charlotte Country Day School
- Central Piedmont Community College: Levine Campus
- Levine Center for the Arts
- Levine Children's Hospital
- Levine Jewish Community Center and Shalom Park
- Levine Museum of the New South
- Levine Science Research Center at Duke University
- Leon Levine Hall of Health Sciences at Appalachian State University
- Levine School of Health Sciences at Wingate University
- Johnson C. Smith University: Family Dollar Room, a multipurpose room used for student activities, meetings, and training
- Campbell University: Leon Levine Hall, home of the Jerry M. Wallace School of Osteopathic Medicine
