= Everything's A Dollar =

American discount store chain

- Founded: 1985; 41 years ago in Virginia Beach, Virginia, United States
- Founder: Bo Perry
- Fate: Bankruptcy

Everything's A Dollar was a retail store that sold discounted items for one dollar. Founded by Bo Perry, it was headquartered in Virginia Beach, Virginia.

== History ==
The first store opened on the Virginia Beach boardwalk in 1985, and was initially only open during the summer. At the time, the concept was a novelty, though it was inspired by the 10-cent stores of the 19th century, first started by Woolworth's Department Store. It was the first "dollar store" since the first similarly priced merchant, Dollar General, raised it's prices in the 1960s. Michael Porter, the founder of one of their venders, suggested that Perry open a store in a mall—an idea Perry was suspicious of. He believed the concept would only appeal to tourists. However, Perry offered to financially back the venture, and they opened the first mall location in October 1985 in Tower Mall in nearby Chesapeake.

Buying closeout merchandise, they would sell it at discounts of up to 70-percent. "Price checks" were a common feature, where the manager would yell "price check," and the staff would reply in unison, "Everything's a dollar!" The company reached approximately 20 million in sales from 61 stores in the 1989 fiscal year. Wisconsin Toy Co. purchased Everything's A Dollar in 1989 for 354,600 shares of its own stock. By January 1990, the store had 102 locations, and became a subsidiary for the Milwaukee-based Value Merchants Inc.

In his book Dead Companies Walking, hedge fund manager Scott Fearon says that in 1993, he decided to short on the store after learning that it consistently doubled the number of stores each year, and was not thoughtful in the inventory it purchased. In January 1994, Value Merchant's Inc filed to reorganize its finances in bankruptcy court, a move that affected the 400 locations of Everything's a Dollar. While the store faced no closures at that time, by October of the previous year, the chain had brought in $154.8 million in assets, while accruing a debt of $188.9 million. By March of that year, they announced the coming liquidation of 147 stores. By April 1996, Value Merchant's stock dropped to 3.1 cents a share, down from its high of $7.10 a share.

An analyst for Smith Barney saw the decline of Everything's a Dollar as an advantage for the still-in-business Dollar Tree, saying that the latter chain had a consistent merchandising strategy, unlike the former.

== Controversies ==
The store faced multiple product recalls. In 1992, the U.S. Consumer Product Safety Commission (CSPC) found that the Fish Style Jolly Rattles posed a choking risk, and Everything's a Dollar announced a recall of 11,616 sold. In 1996, the store recalled 9,382 toy trucks, as they were a potential choking hazard. While there were no reports of injury, the CSPC said the toy's axles were a potential choking hazard to children under the age of three.

== See also ==
- Dollar Tree, another fixed-priced Virginia retailer
