= Howard R. Levine =

American businessman

Howard Russel Levine
- Born: December 25, 1958 (age 67); United States
- Occupation: Business executive
- Known for: Former CEO of the Family Dollar store chain founded by his father
- Spouse: Dr. Julie Lerner Levine (second wife)
- Children: 4, (2 with his first wife and 2 with his second)
- Parent(s): Barbara (née Leven) and Leon Levine

Howard R. Levine is an American business executive who was the former Chairman of the Board and Chief Executive Officer of Family Dollar and is the son of Leon Levine, the founder of the company. He oversaw the buyout of Family Dollar by Dollar Tree in 2017.

== Early life and education ==
Levine was born to a Jewish family, the son of Barbara (née Leven) and Leon Levine. He graduated from the University of North Carolina at Chapel Hill in 1981 with a Bachelor of Science degree.

== Career ==
After graduating from college, Levine worked in the Merchandising Department at Family Dollar, rising to the position of Senior Vice President-Merchandising and Advertising from 1981 to 1987. Thereafter, he served as President of Best Price Clothing Stores, Inc., from 1988 to 1992.

From 1992 to 1996, Levine was self-employed as an investment manager.

In 1996, Levine rejoined Family Dollar and served in various positions until he became Chief Executive Officer in August 1998.

In July 2014, Levine oversaw the buyout of Family Dollar by Dollar Tree in a deal totaling $8.5 billion. Levine remained with the company following the merger and was appointed to Dollar Tree's board of directors. Levine stepped down as CEO on January 15, 2016.

=== Compensation ===
While CEO of Family Dollar in 2009, Howard R. Levine earned a total compensation of $5,612,726, which included a base salary of $948,654, a cash bonus of $1,894,615, stocks granted of $1,338,224, and options granted of $1,308,528.

== Philanthropy ==
Levine established the Howard R. Levine Foundation, a donor-advised fund. As of 2015, it had $65 million in assets after a $45 million addition by Levine.

In February 2017, Levine and his wife Julie donated $2 million to Providence Day school in Charlotte. The couple made a $100,000 matching gift through the foundation to the Time Out Youth Center's capital campaign in May 2017. Later in 2017, the foundation donated 500,000 to the Crisis Care Initiative.

== Personal life ==
He has two children with his first wife. He is married to Dr. Julie Lerner Levine with whom he has two children.
