= Levine Science Research Center =

Coordinates: 36.0045°N 78.9419°W

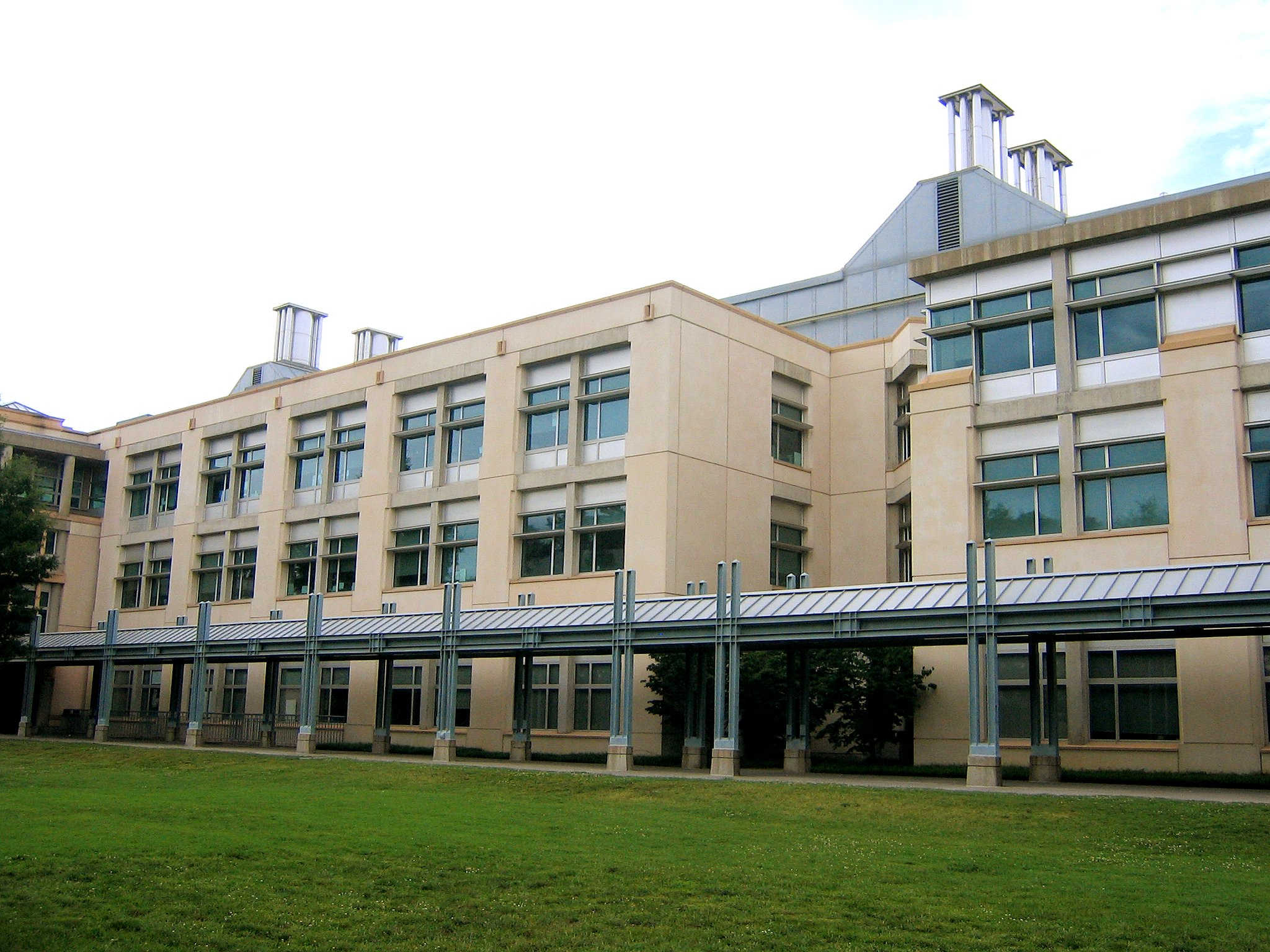
- Interactive map of the Levine Science Research Center area

General information
- Architectural style: Incorporates Gothic and Modern styles
- Location: West Campus, Duke University
- Current tenants: Environment, Engineering, Cognitive Neuroscience
- Named for: Leon Levine
- Completed: 1994

Technical details
- Floor area: 341,000 square feet (31,700 m^{2})

Design and construction
- Architect: Payette Associates

Website
- School of the Environment

The Levine Science Research Center (LSRC) is a 341,000-square-foot (31,700 m^{2}) facility on Duke University's west campus located at 308 Research Drive Durham, NC 27708. The LSRC is currently the largest single-site interdisciplinary research facility in the U.S. Its classrooms are shared by several departments, but the majority of its offices and laboratories are utilized by the Nicholas School of the Environment, the Pratt School of Engineering, the Center for Cognitive Neuroscience and Developmental and the departments of Computer Science, Pharmacology and Cancer Biology and Cell and Molecular Biology. The building was named for Leon Levine, the CEO of Family Dollar Stores.

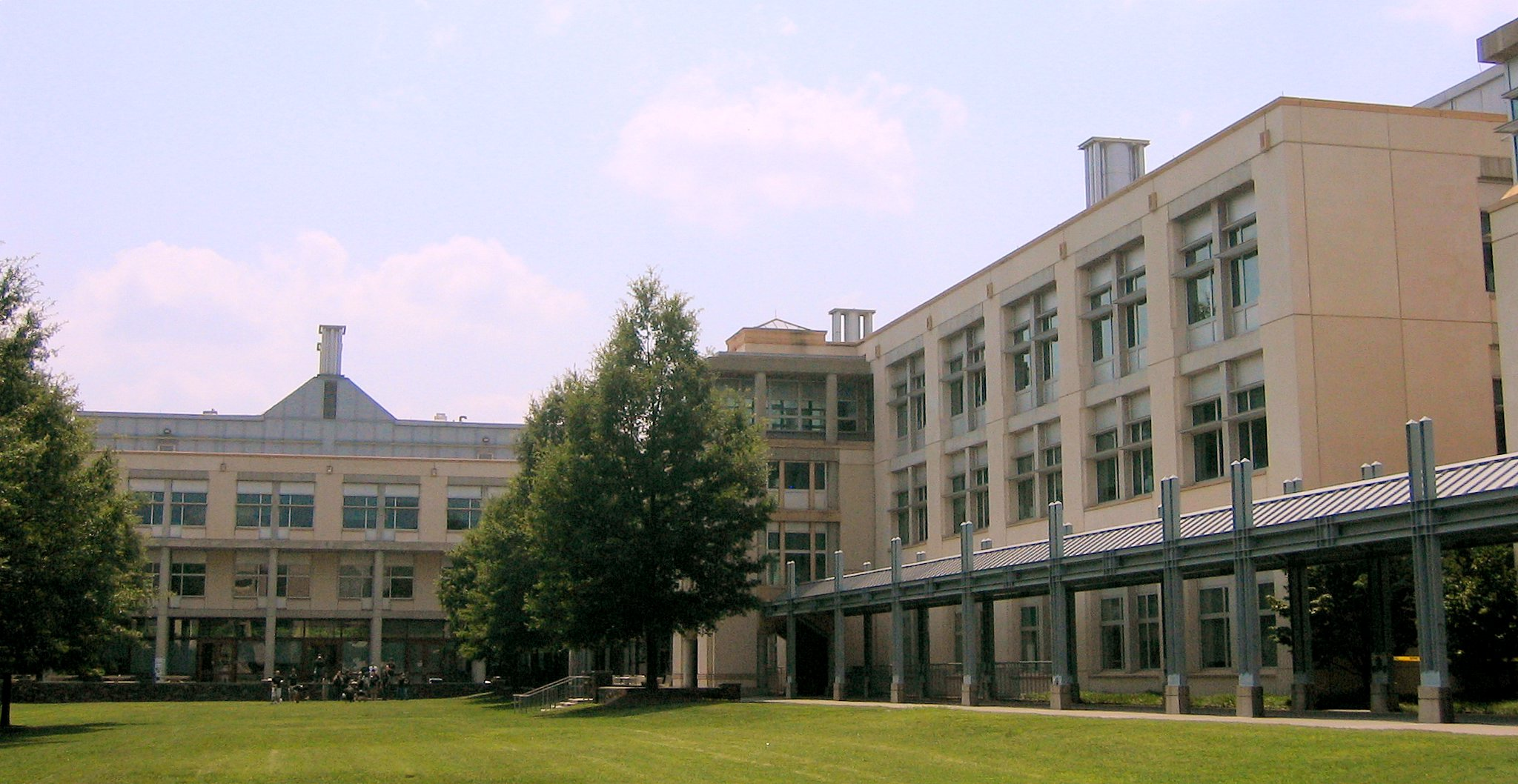
The $77 million LSRC
