= GrandPa's =

Former discount store chain

GrandPa's, Inc.
- Industry: Retail (Department & Discount)
- Founded: 1954; 72 years ago
- Defunct: 1999; 27 years ago
- Fate: Sold to Value City
- Headquarters: St. Louis, Missouri
- Key people: Tom Holley, Jack Holley
- Products: Clothing, footwear, bedding, furniture, jewelry, beauty products, electronics, and housewares.
- Website: none

GrandPa's or GrandPa Pidgeon's was an American discount store chain. The chain was founded by husband and wife Tom and Mildred Pidgeon, the former of whom gained the nickname "grandpa" due to his having become a grandparent at an early age. Tom and Mildred Pidgeon worked at a pottery factory in Ohio during the Great Depression, and chose to take factory seconds of pottery to Missouri to sell. The first Grandpa Pidgeon's was opened in February 1954, and managed by his son-in-law, John (Jack) Holley, born in 1924 in Galena, Kansas. In 1958 Jack Holley began a separate but related enterprise known as Grandpa's, and opened a store on Collinsville Road between East St. Louis and Collinsville, Illinois. Over the next decade, Holley subsequently opened several other stores in the St. Louis metropolitan area, before buying the company outright from his father-in-law in 1968.

Holley formed the Gramex Corporation in 1970, which also oversaw such companies as Forsythe Computers and Omni Sports, which was forced to close due to increasing competition.

In 1986 Jack Holley retired and turned the company over to his oldest son Tom Holley, who presided over an expansion both within and outside the metro St. Louis area into locations such as Greenville, Illinois and Farmington, Missouri, among other places. By the late 1990s there were thirteen Grandpa's locations.

GrandPa's was sold, in 1999, to Value City. It had approximately $200,000,000 in sales in its final year. It was profitable until its sale, failing to end only 1993 in the black, but was said to be facing a harder struggle near the end.

The company was known for their newspaper distributed advertising circulars that were printed mostly with black ink on a brown paper, in contrast to the glossy full color circulars of competitors.

== See also ==
- Deal$, chain of discount stores founded by Tom Holley in St. Louis, later sold
- Jack Murdock (actor), portrayed Grandpa Pidgeon in television advertisements
