= Kansas City Fraternal Order of Police =

The Kansas City Fraternal Order of Police (KCFOP), originally the Kansas City Police Officer's Association, is a police union established in 1999 to represent the sergeants, police officers, and detectives of the Kansas City Police Department (KCPD).

Members of the KCPD, alongside the St Louis Police Department, are the only police officers in the United States designated "Officers of the State", and administered by a Board of Police Commissioners who are appointed in staggered terms, by the Governor of Missouri. This practice began in 1874 and continued until 1932 when the KCPD was returned to city control. The police department was returned to state control in 1939 due to overwhelming foreign political corruption of the Tom Pendergast era and the department remains under state control to this day.

In 1993, the Kansas City Police Officers' Association (KCPOA) was reorganized as the Kansas City Missouri Fraternal Order of Police Lodge #99.

In 2009, the Kansas City Board of Police Commissioners (BOPC) recognized the Kansas City Fraternal Order of Police, Lodge 99, as the official bargaining representative for every member below the rank of captain. In 2013, the BOPC recognized Lodge 99 as the bargaining representative for every civilian under the rank of manager. The KCFOP represents over 1800 members, making it the largest Public Safety Bargaining unit in the state.

The KCFOP is one chapter of the Missouri Fraternal Order of Police that represents more than 5300 sworn officers in the great State of Missouri, and in turn is a member lodge of the National Fraternal Order of Police.

The independent organization, The Friends of the KCFOP Political Action Committee, works in support of the interests of KCFOP.
