= Lincoln Pratson =

American geologist

Lincoln F. Pratson is an American geologist currently the Truman and Nellie Semans/Alex Brown & Sons Professor of Earth and Ocean Sciences at Duke University.
