= Brigade Capital =

Investment manager

Brigade Capital Management, LP
- Company type: Private
- Industry: Private equity, Hedge fund
- Founded: 2006
- Headquarters: New York City, USA; London, UK; Tokyo, Japan
- Key people: Donald E. Morgan III, CFA
- Products: Leveraged buyout, Distressed securities, Growth capital
- Total assets: $34billion
- Website: www.brigadecapital.com

Brigade Capital Management, LP, more commonly referred to as Brigade Capital, is a global alternative investment manager specializing in credit investment strategies. The firm employs a multi-strategy, multi-asset class investment approach focused on leveraged balance sheets and manages core strategies across long/short credit, distressed debt, capital structure arbitrage, long/short equities and structured credit. The hedge fund invests primarily in the retail, media, telecommunications, healthcare, finance, utilities and energy sectors with particular expertise in distressed securities, bankruptcy and reorganization.

== History ==
Founded in 2006 by Patrick W. Kelly and Donald E. Morgan III, the firm is headquartered in New York City with offices in London, Tokyo and Sydney. In March 2017, Brigade Capital won Firm of the Year from Absolute Return Awards, an award given to the world’s best-performing hedge funds.

In 2017, the hedge fund was allegedly defrauded by Craig Carton of WFAN (AM) along with co-conspirators Michael Wright and Joseph Meli, who reportedly ran a Ponzi scheme falsely claiming access to millions of dollars of concert tickets at face value through non-existent agreements with concert promoters.

On August 17, 2020 Citigroup Inc. filed a lawsuit against Brigade Capital Management LP, seeking the return of the hedge-fund manager’s share of nearly $900 million payment that Citi said it paid by mistake to Revlon Inc. lenders. Brigade “has unlawfully attempted to capitalize on the mistaken payment,” Citi said in the complaint, filed in New York federal court. The payments were related to loans made to Revlon by various private lenders.

The lenders to Revlon, Brigade Capital Management and HPS Investment Partners, received the funds from Citigroup. The companies sought a court order forcing the return of collateral by Revlon. Citigroup, the administrative agent on the loan, was also named as a defendant in the lawsuit by the firms, although the company was in the process of resigning from the agent role.

Brigade and other lenders took the position that they were not obligated to return the money. A Federal court ruled on 16 February 2021 that the lenders are under no obligation to return any of the monies mistakenly received. Citicorp is appealing the ruling. However, in the meantime, the lenders including Brigade are not free to do with the money as they please, according to the court, which said that a restraining order it put in place to freeze the funds when the litigation began should remain in force for the moment, pending further arguments.
