= Family Dollar =

American retailer

Family Dollar Stores Inc.

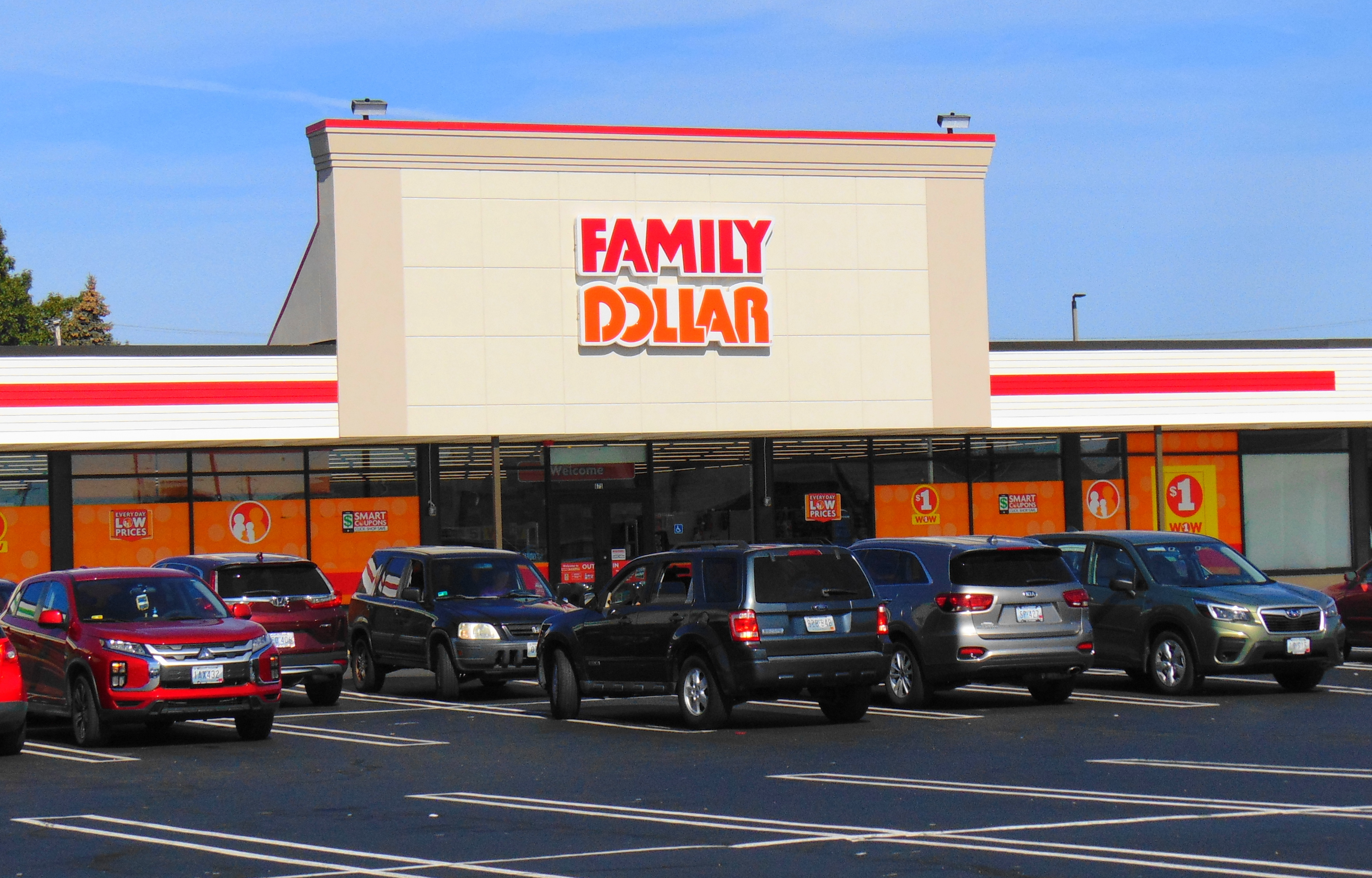
- Family Dollar store in Pawtucket, Rhode Island
- Type: Subsidiary
- Traded as: NYSE: FDO
- Industry: Retail, Variety, Discount
- Founded: November 1959; 67 years ago Charlotte, North Carolina, U.S.
- Founder: Leon Levine
- Headquarters: Chesapeake, Virginia, United States
- Number of locations: 8,200
- Area served: United States (except Alaska and Hawaii)
- Key people: Michael C. Creedon Jr. (CEO); Jason Nordin (President); Jeff Davis (CFO); Bobby Aflatooni (CIO)
- Products: Clothing, cleaning supplies, home decor, and grocery.
- Revenue: ▲US$ 10.489 billion (2014)
- Net income: ▼US$ 284.5 million (2014)
- Total assets: ▲US$ 3.857 billion (2014)
- Number of employees: 59,330
- Parent: Dollar Tree
- Website: FamilyDollar.com
- Footnotes; *Previously traded on NYSE as FDO before DLTR merge. "Family Dollar Merge SEC datafile". www.sec.gov. Published 10/23/2014; access-date10/03/2024. Retrieved 2024-10-03

Family Dollar Stores, Inc. is an American variety store chain founded in 1959 by Leon Levine in Charlotte, North Carolina. With over 8,000 locations in all states except Alaska and Hawaii, it was once the second largest retailer of its type in the United States until it was acquired by Dollar Tree in 2015. Its headquarters operations were then moved from Matthews, North Carolina, to Chesapeake, Virginia.

In June 2014, activist investor and major shareholder Carl Icahn demanded that Family Dollar be immediately put up for sale. On July 28, Dollar Tree announced that it would buy Family Dollar for $8.5 billion. The sale delivered a windfall to Icahn, who had acquired his 9.4 percent stake in June. In January 2015, Family Dollar shareholders approved the Dollar Tree bid.

Family Dollar, and dollar stores in general, have been alleged to create food deserts: areas with poor access to healthy and affordable food. In 2022, Family Dollar was sued by the Arkansas Attorney General following an investigation by the FDA into a rat infestation at its West Memphis, Arkansas, distribution center. The lawsuit ended in a $41 million fine to the company and the temporary closure of 400 stores.

In 2024, Dollar Tree announced that it would consider a potential spin-off or sale of the Family Dollar brand. On March 26, 2025, Dollar Tree announced that it would sell its Family Dollar business for $1 billion; the sale was completed on July 7, 2025.

== History ==
=== 1959–1980 ===
Family Dollar was founded in 1959 by Leon Levine, a 21-year-old entrepreneur. In November of that year, the company's first store was opened, in Charlotte, North Carolina. In 1961, their first store in South Carolina opened, followed by stores in Georgia and Virginia, which were opened in 1962 and 1965, respectively. During the 1960s, the store company was largely a southern United States operation. By 1969, there were fifty stores in Charlotte alone.

The 1970s were growing years for the store chain. In 1970, Family Dollar's stock went public for the first time, at $14.50 per share. In 1971, the chain's 100th store opened, followed by their 200th in 1974 and their 300th in 1978. Also in 1974, a distribution center was opened in Matthews, North Carolina. In 1979, Family Dollar stock began trading at the New York Stock Exchange.

=== 1980–2000 ===
In 1981, the chain's 400th store was opened, followed by a 500th store in 1982 and a 700th in 1983. The 1980s saw expansion at a wider scale for the company, and by 1989, 1,500 stores were operating.

The 1990s saw the pace of expansion slow down compared to the 1980s, with 1,000 stores opened. The company opened distribution centers in West Memphis, Arkansas; Front Royal, Virginia, and Duncan, Oklahoma. Since 2000, the pace of growth increased significantly, with the addition of about 3,500 new stores, and new distribution centers opening in Morehead, Kentucky; Maquoketa, Iowa; Odessa, Texas; Marianna, Florida; and Rome, New York.

=== 2000–2010 ===
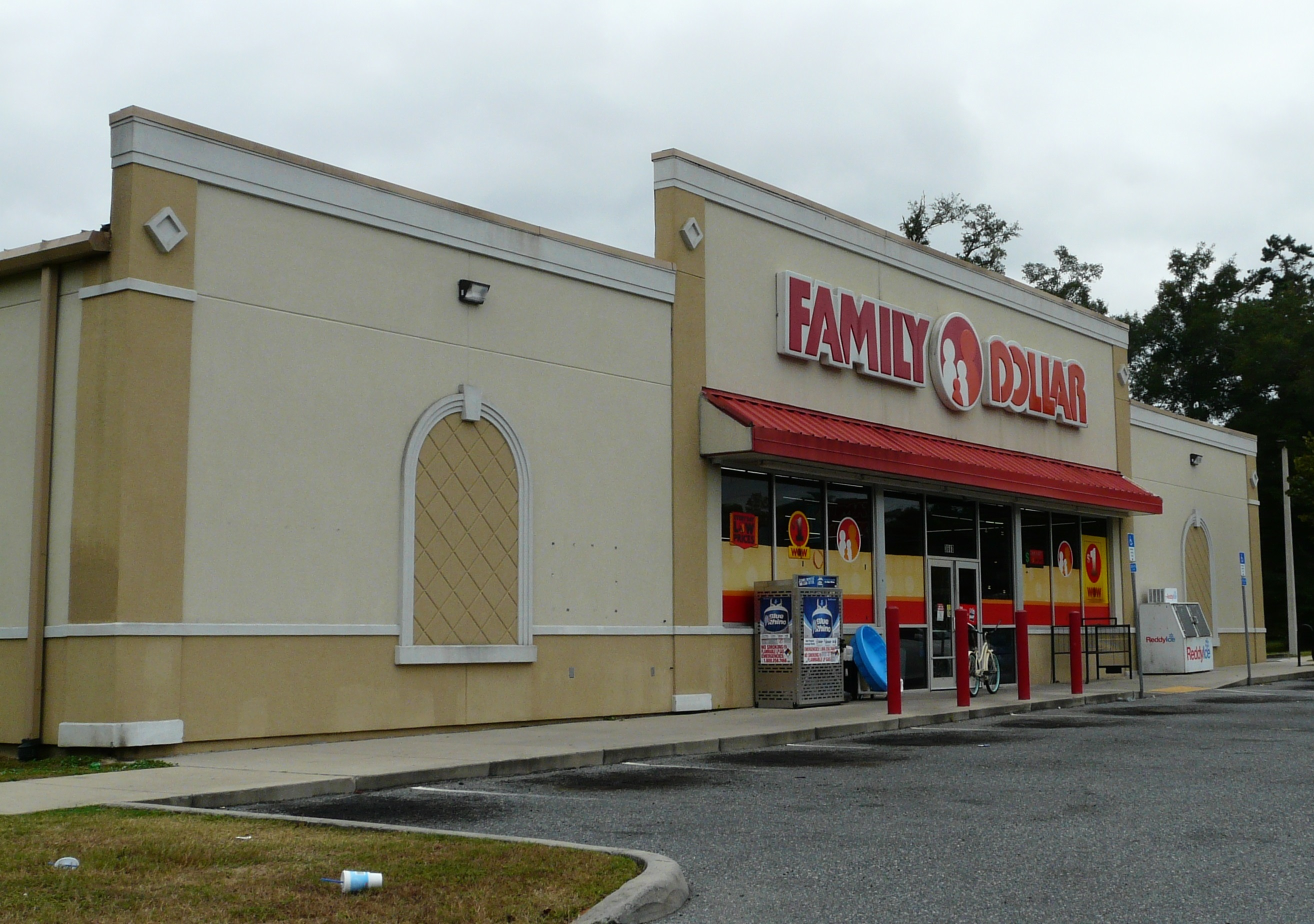
Store in Tallahassee, Florida

In 2001, Family Dollar joined the S&P 500 stock market index. In 2002, the company joined the Fortune 500 list of largest publicly held companies.

When Leon Levine retired in 2003, his son Howard R. Levine succeeded him as Chairman and CEO, keeping this multibillion-dollar company in the family.

On March 3, 2005, after opening over 2000 retail locations in the previous five years, Family Dollar announced a new distribution center would be built in Rome, New York. Later that month, Family Dollar restated the company's fiscal 2000 to fiscal 2004 earnings per share downward by 2 cents to 3 cents a year, to correct lease-accounting issues.

=== 2010–2020 ===
As of August 2011, there were 7,000 stores in 44 states. According to their website in 2005, Family Dollar opened 500 new stores, 350 more in 2006, and an additional 300 in 2007. According to the company's 2013 Corporate Profile in 2010, Family Dollar opened 200 new stores, 300 more in 2011, 475 in 2012, and an additional 500 in 2013. On October 3, 2012, Family Dollar said they will open 500 stores in 2013. The next day, Family Dollar partnered with Healthways. Family Dollar operates 11 distribution centers – the latest of which opened in St. George, Utah, on October 16, 2013.

Family Dollar created a game show based on the store in late 2016. Hosted by celebrity chef Pat Neely, the show Save to Win aired on The CW between 2016 and 2017.

==== Selling pressure ====
In March 2011, Family Dollar rejected a takeover offer by Nelson Peltz's Trian Fund Management reportedly between $55 and $60 a share.

On June 6, 2014, activist investor Carl Icahn disclosed that his firm, Icahn Enterprises, held a 9.4% stake in Family Dollar. On June 19, 2014, Icahn demanded in an open letter that Family Dollar be put up for sale immediately. Goldman Sachs and other analysts had identified a number of potential buyers.

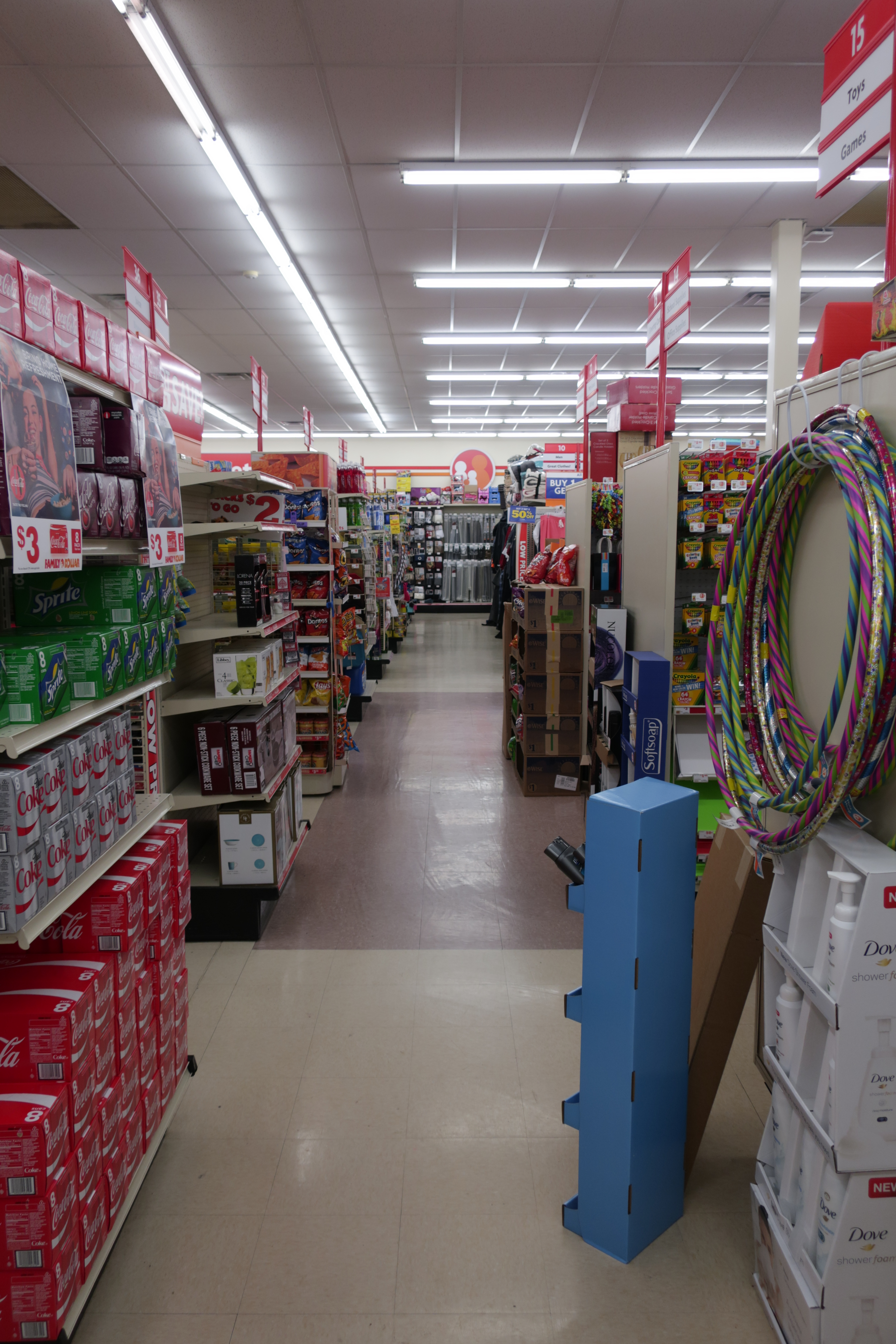
Interior of a Family Dollar in Gillette, Wyoming

As of June 19, 2014, 22% of Family Dollar's shares were controlled by activist investors.

==== Acquisition by Dollar Tree ====
On July 28, 2014, Dollar Tree announced that it would acquire Family Dollar for $74.50 per share, a deal valuing Family Dollar at $8.5 billion, and that Dollar Tree would also assume $1 billion in debt currently owed by Family Dollar, for a total of $9.5 billion. Dollar Tree CEO Bob Sasser said that Family Dollar CEO Howard R. Levine will remain with the company following the merger and will be appointed to Dollar Tree's board of directors.

On August 18, 2014, Dollar General announced a counterbid for $78.50 per share. The enterprise value of the Dollar General bid was $9.7 billion compared to that of Dollar Tree of $9.2 billion, while the quantum return to shareholders was varying as the stock and cash deal valuation was subjected to fluctuations of price of the competing bidders stock.

On August 20, 2014, Family Dollar rejected the Dollar General bid, saying it was not a matter of price, but concerns over antitrust issues that had convinced the company and its advisers that the deal could not be concluded on the terms proposed. Days after, Dollar General CEO Rick Dreiling sent a letter to the Family Dollar board of directors claiming that Levine rejected merger requests to protect his job. Levine, in a statement, said the Family Dollar board had been analyzing potential antitrust issues that could arise from doing a deal with Dollar General since the start of the year, and that was the reason it was not accepting the Dollar General bid.

On January 22, 2015, Family Dollar shareholders approved the Dollar Tree bid.

Several stores were required to be sold as a condition of the sale. Sycamore Partners acquired the stores in 2014 under the corporate name Dollar Express. The stores continued to operate under the Family Dollar name. In 2017, Dollar General acquired Dollar Express and converted the stores.

As a result of Family Dollar's sale to Dollar Tree, some Family Dollar stores have opened in the same plaza, and at times even next door to Dollar Tree locations. On March 6, 2019, the retailer announced that it will close up to 400 stores nationwide due to heavy pressure from an activist investor. Most store locations were either shut down entirely or replaced with Dollar Tree stores.

The company has deployed a newer store format known as "H2" in new and renovated locations, which have a larger focus on groceries and incorporate Dollar Tree merchandise. The company has also deployed co-branded Family Dollar/Dollar Tree stores in smaller markets.

=== 2020–present ===
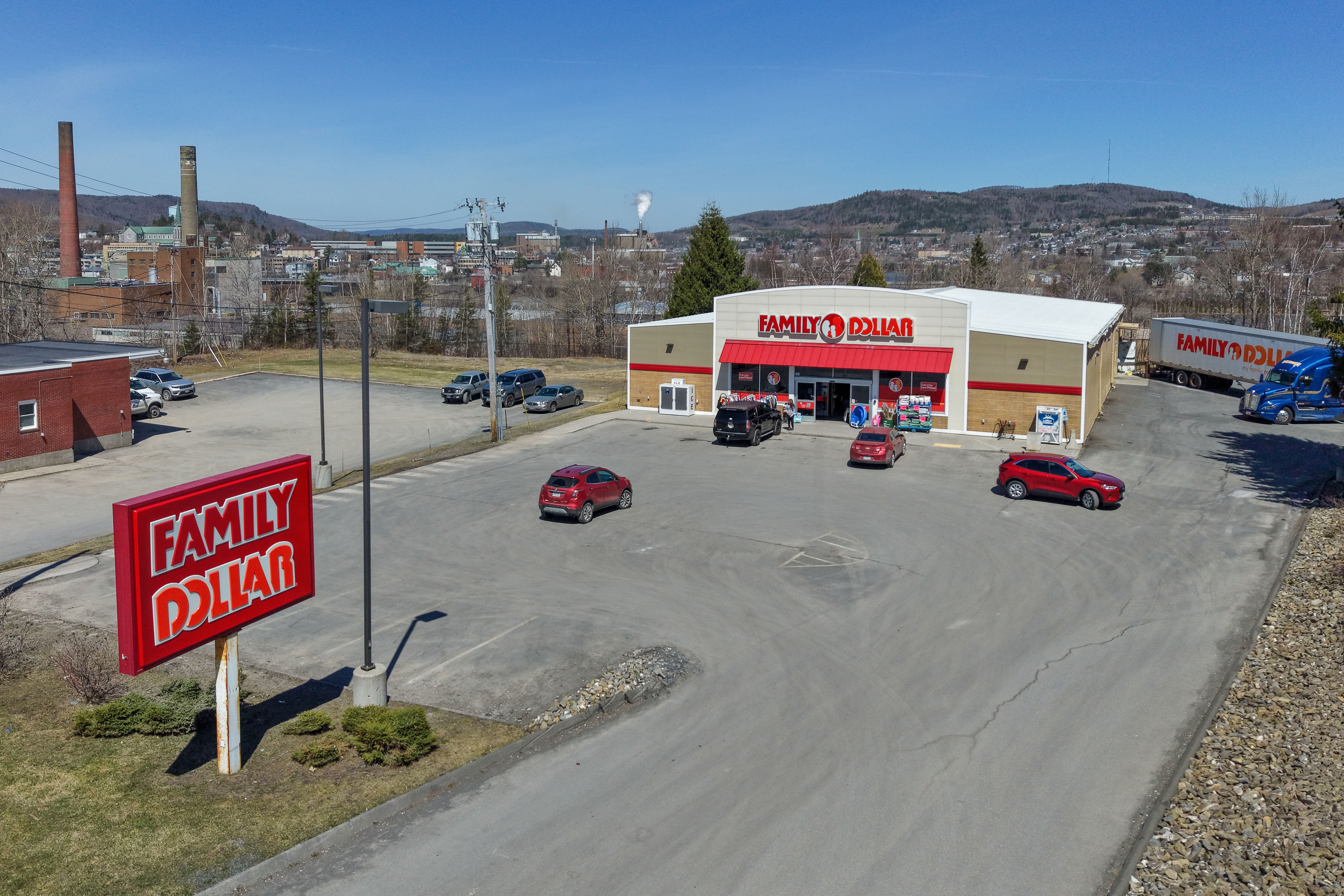
Location in Madawaska, Maine

In May 2020, eight Family Dollar stores were damaged by rioting and looting during the George Floyd protests in Minneapolis–Saint Paul, with two locations being destroyed by arson during the widespread civil unrest.

In March 2024, Dollar Tree, owner of Family Dollar stores since 2015, announced it would close 600 retail stores by July 2024 and another 370 over the next few years. The company will also close 30 Dollar Tree stores as well.

On April 28, 2024, a tornado destroyed Family Dollar parent company Dollar Tree's distribution center in Marietta, Oklahoma. On August 16, 2024, the dilapidated warehouse caught on fire.

==== Sale to capital management firms ====
In June 2024 it was reported that Dollar Tree were in discussions to potentially spinoff or sell the Family Dollar brand due to poor financial performance for the chain. On February 20, 2025, Reuters reported that Apollo Global Management, Sycamore Partners, and Brigade Capital Management were among the parties expressing interest in acquiring the Family Dollar brand.

On March 26, 2025, Dollar Tree announced it had reached an agreement to sell Family Dollar to Brigade Capital Management and Macellum Capital Management LLC for $1 billion.

== Criticism and lawsuits ==
=== Morgan v. Family Dollar Stores, Inc. ===
In January 2001, store managers Janice Morgan and Barbara Richardson filed a complaint alleging willful violations of the Fair Labor Standards Act (FLSA) by Family Dollar for refusal to pay them overtime wages, asserting that they were required to work 60 to 90 hours a week "performing manual labor, such as stocking shelves, running the cash registers, unloading trucks, and cleaning the parking lots, floors, and bathrooms." Family Dollar countered by asserting that it classified store managers as "exempt executives and denied any violations were willful."

The plaintiffs filed a motion to certify collective action nationwide in April 2001, which was renewed in October 2001 and October 2002. The district court granted the motion to "all former and current Store Managers who work and/or worked for the Defendant over the last three years." A recorded 12,145 notices were mailed out to potentially affected employees in December 2002. Extended discovery in the case ended on August 29, 2003. Depositions, court orders, and fact findings continued until the first trial date in 2005.

After the first trial ended in a deadlocked jury, a second trial was scheduled for 2006, which lasted for eight days, wherein "the jury reached a verdict, expressly finding the store managers were not exempt." Plaintiffs numbered 1,424 by the end of the trial, and Family Dollar moved to decertify the verdict, which awarded a judgment of over $1.5 million to 163 employees who "did not satisfy the third requirement in the executive exemption test" and $17.5 million to the other plaintiffs.

In December 2008, the United States Court of Appeals for the Eleventh Circuit handed the final verdict on the case: "The jury awarded $19,092,003.39 in overtime wages. The court entered a final judgment of $35,576,059.48 against Family Dollar consisting of $17,788,029.74 in overtime wages and an equal amount in liquidated damages." The United States Supreme Court decided not to hear Family Dollar's appeal in the case in 2009.

=== Allegations of creating food deserts ===
Family Dollar, and dollar stores in general, have been alleged by a number of studies, individuals, and organizations to proliferate food deserts: areas with limited access to healthy and affordable food. Dollar stores are alleged to outcompete local grocery stores, and end up being one of the few options available for purchasing food in some communities. In line with these allegations, a number of states have passed restrictions on where new dollar stores can be opened.

=== Rodent infestation in warehouse ===
In February 2022, Family Dollar temporarily closed 400 stores in Alabama, Arkansas, Louisiana, Mississippi, Missouri, and Tennessee and recalled certain products purchased from January 1, 2021, through the present after the FDA found unsanitary conditions, including a rodent infestation, at the company's distribution center in West Memphis, Arkansas. On February 18, 2022, the FDA announced that over 1000 rats were found in the Family Dollar distribution center in West Memphis. On May 18, 2022, the company announced that the West Memphis distribution center would be shut down permanently on or before July 17, 2022, with over 300 employees affected. Inspection reports related to the investigation showed that violations had occurred as far back as January 2021, and the lawsuit determined that Family dollar had been aware of the infestation as early as January 2020.

Family Dollar pleaded guilty to federal criminal charges relating to the infestation, agreeing to a $41.675 million fine and forfeiture, the largest penalty ever levied by the federal government for food safety violations. As part of the deal, Family Dollar agreed to pay $1.125 million to the state of Tennessee. The November 19, 2023, episode of Last Week Tonight with John Oliver discussed Dollar General, Dollar Tree, and Family Dollar and included a viral video from one of the West Memphis workers feeding a live rat.

Although the West Memphis distribution center was to permanently close, it underwent a $100 million development that rebuilt the facility after the rodent infestation incident. It reopened in 2024 as a Dollar Tree distribution center.

=== Overcharging customers ===
Family Dollar chain failed more than 2,100 government price-accuracy inspections in 20 states between 2022 and 2025. A big offender was a Family Dollar store in Provo, Utah that failed 28 pricing inspections. On one visit, an inspector discovered overcharges for 48% of the items she tested.

Family Dollar agreed to pay $63 million to settle Federal Trade Commission and state allegations that the company charged customers more at the register than the prices displayed on shelves, price tags and advertisements. The order prohibits Family Dollar from misrepresenting the price of its goods or services and requires the retailer to implement a pricing accuracy program. According to the complaint, thousands of Family Dollar stores nationwide have overcharged shoppers, including in low-income communities. The complaint also alleges that consumers from across the country have consistently reported widespread pricing discrepancies, and regulatory inspections have confirmed that price labels are inaccurate in stores across the nation, with Family Dollar frequently charging higher prices at the register. Under the proposed settlement, Family Dollar would offer $40 million in compensation to eligible customers, $20 million in discounts to shoppers and more than $3 million to the participating states.
