= History of Duke University =

The history of Duke University began when Brown's Schoolhouse, a private subscription school in Randolph County, North Carolina (in the present-day town of Trinity), was founded in 1838. The school was renamed to Union Institute Academy in 1841, Normal College in 1851, and to Trinity College in 1859. Finally moving to Durham in 1892, the school grew rapidly, primarily due to the contributions of Washington Duke and Julian S. Carr, powerful and respected Methodists who had grown wealthy through the tobacco industry. In 1924, Washington Duke's son, James B. Duke, established The Duke Endowment, a $40 million (about $430 million in 2005 dollars) trust fund, some of which was to go to Trinity College. The president thus renamed the school Duke University, as a memorial to Washington Duke and his family.

== Beginnings: 1838–1886 ==
The school was organized by the Union Institute Society, a group of Methodists and Quakers under the leadership of Reverend Brantley York, and in 1841, North Carolina issued a charter for Union Institute Academy from the original Brown's Schoolhouse. The state legislature granted a rechartering of the academy as Normal College in 1851, and the privilege of granting degrees in 1853. To keep the school operating, the trustees agreed to provide free education for Methodist preachers in return for financial support by the church, and in 1859 the transformation was formalized with a name change to Trinity College and the adoption of the motto "Eruditio et Religio," meaning "Knowledge and Religion."

This era was a time of important firsts. In 1871, Chi Phi was organized as the school's first student social organization. In 1878, Mary, Persis, and Theresa Giles became the first women to be awarded degrees. At that time, women were allowed only as day students. In 1881, Yao-ju "Charlie" Soong from Weichau, China, enrolled, becoming the school's first international student.

== Move to Durham: 1887–1900 ==
John C. Kilgo sparked Washington Duke's interest in the university.

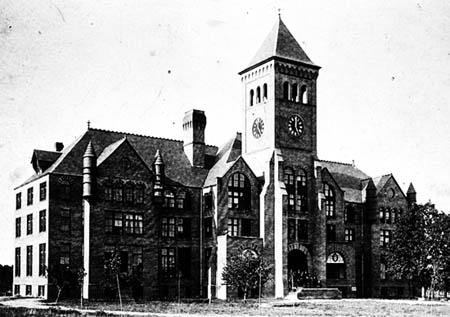
One of the first buildings on the original Durham campus (now East Campus), the Washington Duke Building ("Old Main") was later demolished when the campus was rebuilt.

In 1887, Yale-educated economist John Franklin Crowell became President of Trinity College. Committed to the German university model which emphasized research over recitation, Crowell directed a major revision in the curriculum and convinced the trustees to move to a more urban location. In 1892, Trinity opened in Durham, largely due to the generosity of Washington Duke and Julian S. Carr, powerful and respected Methodists who had grown prosperous through the tobacco industry (see American Tobacco Company and Duke Power). Carr donated the site, which today is Duke's East Campus, while Washington Duke contributed $100,000 for the endowment and construction of a female dormitory named after his daughter Mary, with the stipulation of placing women on an "equal footing with men".

John C. Kilgo became president in 1894 and greatly increased the interest of the Duke family in Trinity. Washington Duke offered three gifts of $100,000 (about $2,200,000 in 2005 dollars) each for endowment. Trinity was the first white institution of higher education in the South to invite Booker T. Washington to speak (in 1900). In 1896 Joseph Maytubby became the first Native American graduate of Trinity.

== Bassett Affair: 1903 ==
John Spencer Bassett in 1891

President Roosevelt praised the university.

In 1903, a controversy arose that would eventually lead to a significant event in the evolution of academic freedom in U.S. higher education. This series of events is known as the "Bassett Affair." Popular professor John Spencer Bassett published an article in the South Atlantic Quarterly entitled "Stirring Up the Fires of Race Antipathy" in October 1903. In the article, he spoke about improving race relations and gave praise to numerous African Americans. Near the end of the article, he wrote "...Booker T. Washington [is] the greatest man, save General Lee, born in the South in a hundred years..." This led to an outpouring of anger from powerful Democratic party leaders as well as the media and public. Many demanded that Bassett be fired and encouraged parents to take their children out of the university. Resulting from immense public pressure, Bassett offered his resignation if the Board of Trustees requested that he do so. The Board of Trustees then held a meeting to decide the fate of Bassett. In the end, they voted 18-7 not to accept the resignation citing academic freedom. In their decision, they wrote, "We are particularly unwilling to lend ourselves to any tendency to destroy or limit academic liberty, a tendency which has, within recent years, manifested itself in some conspicuous instances, and which has created a feeling of uneasiness for the welfare of American colleges [...] We cannot lend countenance to the degrading notion that professors in American colleges have not an equal liberty of thought and speech with all other Americans." In 1905, President Theodore Roosevelt commended Trinity and Bassett's courageous stand for academic freedom while speaking to the university. He told the school, "You stand for Academic Freedom, for the right of private judgment, for a duty more incumbent upon the scholar than upon any other man, to tell the truth as he sees it, to claim for himself and to give to others the largest liberty in seeking after the truth."

== Blue Devils: 1922 ==
"Les Diables Bleus", World War I nickname of France's Chasseurs Alpins military unit

The mascot for Duke's athletic teams, the Blue Devil, has an interesting history. As World War I ended, the Trinity College Board of Trustees lifted their quarter-century ban of football on campus, leading to an interest in naming the athletic teams. The team was then known as the Trinity Eleven, the Blue and White, or the Methodists (as opposed to the Baptists of nearby rival Wake Forest University). Because of the ambiguity, the student newspaper, the Trinity Chronicle (now called The Chronicle) launched a campaign to create a new mascot. Nominations for a new team name included Catamounts, Grizzlies, Badgers, Dreadnaughts, and Captains. The Trinity Chronicle editor narrowed the many nominations down to those that utilized the school colors of dark blue and white. The narrowed list consisted of Blue Titans, Blue Eagles, Polar Bears, Blue Devils, Royal Blazes, and Blue Warriors. None of the nominations proved to be a clear favorite, but the name Blue Devils elicited criticism that could potentially engender opposition on campus. That year, the football season passed with no official selection.

During the 1922–1923 academic year, campus student leaders and the editors of the two other student publications, The Archive and The Chanticleer, decided that the newspaper staff should decide the name on their own because the nomination process had proved inconclusive. Editor-in-chief William H. Lander and managing editor Mike Bradshaw began referring to the athletic teams as the Blue Devils. Though the name was not officially used that year, no opposition to the name arose (surprising many). The Chronicle's staff continued to use the name and eventually, "Blue Devils" caught on.

== Birth of Duke University: 1924–1938 ==
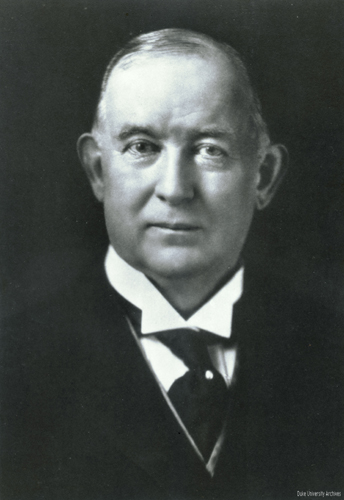
James B. Duke established the Duke Endowment, which provides funds to numerous institutions including Duke University.

On December 11, 1924, James B. Duke established The Duke Endowment, a $40 million trust fund (equivalent to $751 million in 2025), the annual income of which was to be distributed in the Carolinas among hospitals, orphanages, the Methodist Church, three colleges, and a university built around Trinity College. President William Preston Few insisted that the university be named Duke University, and James B. Duke agreed on the condition that it be a memorial to his father and family.

The university grew up quickly. Duke's original campus (now East Campus) was rebuilt from 1925 to 1927 with Georgian-style buildings. The School of Religion and Graduate School opened in 1926. By 1930, the majority of the Gothic Revival buildings on the campus one mile (1.6 km) west were completed in order to accommodate the Undergraduate Trinity College for men as well as the professional schools. The Women's College on East Campus opened in 1930, at the same time as the men's Trinity College, the Medical School, and the Hospital opened on West Campus. The Law School, founded in 1904, was reorganized in 1930. The School of Nursing was founded in 1931, and the construction of Duke Chapel was complete in 1935. The J. Deryl Hart House, the official residence for Duke's presidents, was completed in 1934. In 1938, the School of Forestry (later becoming the School of the Environment) opened. That same year, Duke's football team, deemed the "Iron Dukes," went unscored upon the entire regular season, finally giving up a touchdown to USC in the final minute of the 1939 Rose Bowl loss. Shortly thereafter, Duke University became the thirty-fourth member of the Association of American Universities.

== Expansion and growth: 1939–1992 ==
Hudson Hall, home of Duke engineering

Human progress never rolls in on the wheels of inevitability. It comes through the tireless efforts and the persistent work of dedicated individuals who are willing to be co-workers with God. And without this hard work, time itself becomes an ally of the primitive forces of irrational emotionalism and social stagnation. And so, it is necessary to help time – and to recognize that the time is always right to do what is right.

— Martin Luther King Jr., November 13, 1964, at Duke's Page Auditorium

Engineering, which had been taught since 1903, became a separate school in 1939. In athletics, Duke hosted and competed in the only Rose Bowl game ever played outside of California in Wallace Wade Stadium in 1942. Up until 1963, Duke University was a whites-only school, in both students and faculty. That year, Duke desegregated when five black students, Mary Harris, Gene Kendall, Wilhelmina Reuben-Cooke, Cassandra Smith Rush, and Nathaniel White, enrolled at the university. The university currently has a scholarship named in their honor. Increased activism on campus during the 1960s sparked Martin Luther King Jr. to speak to the university on the civil rights movement's progress on November 14, 1964. The overflow audience in Page Auditorium necessitated that organizers put the speech on loudspeakers to an outside crowd. Another memorable incident in Duke's history towards racial equality was The Silent Vigil at Duke University, which lasted from April 4, 1968, to April 12, 1968. Provoked by the assassination of Martin Luther King Jr., students, faculty, and nonacademic workers participated in The Silent Vigil at Duke University, a peaceful protest that not only demanded collective bargaining rights for the campus' unofficial workers' union, but also advocated against racial discrimination in the local area.

The former governor of North Carolina, Terry Sanford, was elected president in 1969, propelling the Fuqua School of Business's opening. Additionally, the William R. Perkins library completion in 1969 doubled the library's services and increased the collection's total space by five hundred percent. In 1971, the Institute of Policy Sciences and Public Affairs was founded. The separate Woman's College merged back with Trinity as the liberal arts college for both men and women in 1972 and the Mary Lou Williams Center for Black Culture opened in 1983. Duke University Hospital, containing units for medicine, surgery, pediatrics, and obstetrics/gynecology, was finished in 1980. The Bryan University Center, a student union of sorts, was fully constructed two years later. Duke's first NCAA championship was captured by the men's soccer team in 1986. This was followed by the men's basketball team back-to-back championships in 1991 and 1992 under the leadership of Hall of Fame Coach Mike Krzyzewski.

== Recent history: 1993–present ==
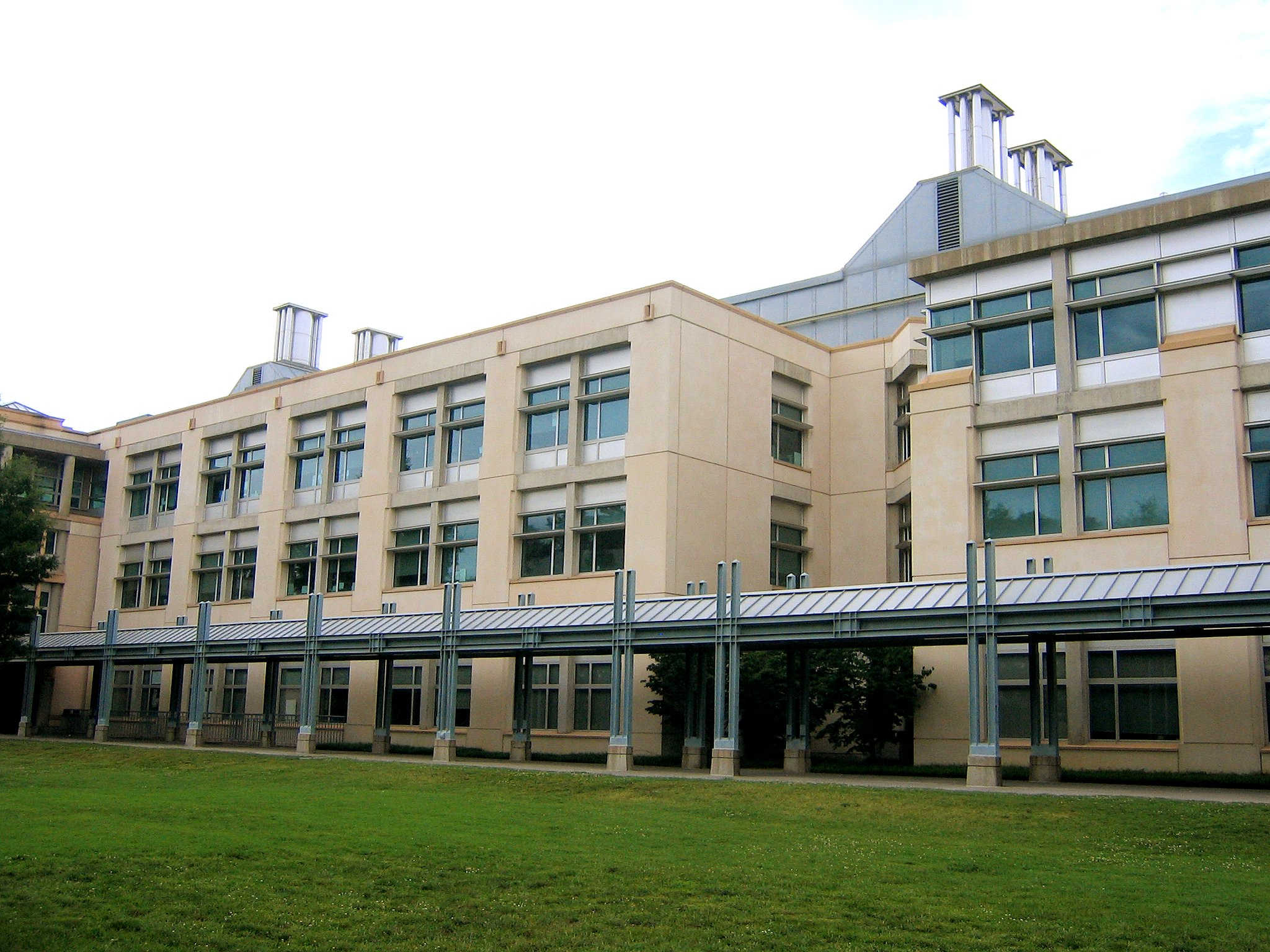
Levine Science Research Center

Duke University's growth and academic focus have dramatically increased the university's reputation as an academic and research institution in recent years. In 1993, Duke's three-member team finished in first place in the prestigious William Lowell Putnam Mathematical Competition, earning the title of the best collegiate undergraduate math team in the United States and Canada. Duke would repeat as champions again in 1996 and 2000. In nine out of the past ten years, Duke's team has finished in the top three, the only school besides Harvard to do so. Since 1992, five Duke students have been named Putnam Fellows.

Construction continued on campus, with the 314,000-square-foot (29,200 m^{2}) Levine Science Research Center (LSRC) opening in 1994 to house interdisciplinary research. Later that year, the Terry Sanford Institute of Public Policy relocated to a new building and new dorms opened on East Campus. In 1995, Peter M. Nicholas ('64), donated $20 million to the School of the Environment, which originated from the School of Forestry and the Duke Marine Lab. Also, James B. Duke's daughter, Doris Duke, gave the university $10 million for research. The next year, recreational facilities received a major facelift, with the Keith and Brenda Brodie Recreational Center opening on East Campus, and a major overhaul of Wilson Recreation Center on West Campus in the works. Also in 1996, Robert Coleman (Ph.D. '65) won the Nobel Prize in Physics.

In 1998, Duke President Nan Keohane initiated a five-year $1.5 billion Campaign for Duke fundraising effort. Former President George H. W. Bush delivered the commencement address, following Jimmy Carter's lead the year before. Edmund T. Pratt, Jr. ('47) endowed the Pratt School of Engineering with a $35 million gift in 1999. A year later, major plans for an overhaul of the residence life structure were approved. In the 2000s (decade), campus growth has shown no signs of slowing down (see Construction projects at Duke University). The Campaign for Duke ended in 2003 with $2.36 billion raised, making it the fifth largest campaign in the history of American higher education.

In the 2004 fiscal year, research expenditures surpassed $490 million, leading to a myriad of important breakthroughs. The Duke Global Health Research Building, one of four laboratories in the U.S. attempting to "develop new vaccines, drugs, and tests to fight infectious diseases for a Duke-led consortium of universities," broke ground. Also undergoing construction was the Duke Smart House, a 4,500-square-foot (420 m^{2}) research center in which undergraduates explore resource-efficient design.

More recent research includes a blueprint for an invisibility cloak using "metamaterials" and Duke researchers' involvement in mapping the final human chromosome, which made world news as the Human Genome Project was finally complete.

== Sustainability ==
Duke University has undertaken a number of initiatives designed to improve campus sustainability. The school receives over 30% of its energy needs from wind and hydroelectric power sources, making it one of the top five purchasers of renewable energy amongst organizations in the field of higher education. The school makes an effort to buy food from local growers, and adjusts the menus of its eateries seasonally. All of the dining establishments on campus use fair trade coffee, recycled napkins, and are required to recycle and compost. The Duke campus presently features 17 projects which are LEED-certified, and all future campus buildings will be required to meet this same certification standard. A plan to redesign a 200-acre (0.81 km^{2}) area of the central campus, which will integrate sustainable practices at all levels of its construction, is also currently under development. As a result of its campus wide efforts at sustainability, Duke University received a B+ grade from the Sustainable Endowments Institute's College Sustainability Report Card 2008.

== Important dates ==
Name changes
Year	Name
1838	Brown School
1841	Union Institute
1851	Normal College
1859	Trinity College
1924	Duke University

Establishment of schools
Year	School/College
1859	Trinity College of Arts & Sciences
1924	School of Law
1926	Divinity School
1926	Graduate School
1930	School of Medicine
1931	School of Nursing
1938	School of the Environment
1939	School of Engineering
1969	School of Business
1971	School of Public Policy
2000	Duke-NUS Medical

Presidents of Duke University
Years	President
1838–1842	Brantley York
1842–1863	Braxton Craven
1863–1865	William Trigg Gannaway
1866–1882	Braxton Craven
1883–1884	Marquis Lafayette Wood
1887–1894	John Franklin Crowell
1894–1910	John Carlisle Kilgo
1910–1940	William Preston Few
1941–1948	Robert Lee Flowers
1949–1960	Arthur Hollis Edens
1960–1963	Julian Deryl Hart
1963–1969	Douglas Maitland Knight
1969–1985	Terry Sanford
1985–1993	H. Keith H. Brodie
1993–2004	Nannerl O. Keohane
2004–2017	Richard H. Brodhead
2017–present	Vincent E. Price

== Timeline ==
Timeline
Year	Event
1838	Brown’s Schoolhouse, a private subscription school, founded in Randolph county
1841	Methodists and Quakers organize Union Institute Academy
1851	State legislature grants rechartering of academy as Normal College
1859	Methodist Church provides financial support, formalizing name change to Trinity College
1871	First social organization on campus founded
1878	First women earn degrees
1881	First international student enrolls
1887	J.F. Crowell inaugurated as president
1892	Trinity moves to Durham, largely due to generosity of Washington Duke and Julian S. Carr
1894	J.F. Kilgo inaugurated as president; Washington Duke donates $300,000 for endowment
1900	Trinity becomes first white institution of higher education in the south to invite Booker T. Washington to speak; first Native American student graduates
1903	Bassett Affair
1922	Chronicle editors coin the term Blue Devils for athletic teams
1924	James B. Duke establishes the $40 million Duke Endowment, propelling the final name change to Duke University
1925	Original campus rebuilt with Georgian style buildings
1930	Majority of construction on the new Gothic Revival-style West Campus is complete
1938	Duke's football team, dubbed the Iron Dukes, dominate their regular season opponents
1942	Duke hosts the Rose Bowl in Wallace Wade Stadium
1964	Dr. Martin Luther King Jr. speaks to the university on the civil rights movement's progress
1969	Terry Sanford, a former governor of North Carolina, is inaugurated as president; Perkins library complete
1971	Institute of Policy Sciences and Public Affairs founded
1972	Women's college merges into Trinity, which serves as the liberal arts college for men and women
1974	Mary Lou Williams Center for Black Culture opens
1980	Duke Hospital opens
1986	Men’s soccer captures Duke’s first NCAA championship
1991	Men's basketball wins its first NCAA title. They would repeat in 1992 and win again in 2001 and 2010.
1993	Keohane inaugurated as the university's eighth president
1994	Duke team wins Putnam Mathematical Competition. Duke teams would win again in 1996 and 2000 and have come in the top-three 9 times from 1996-2005.
1994	Levine Science Research Center (LSRC) opens; Terry Sanford Institute of Public Policy moves into new building
1995	East Campus converts to an all-freshmen campus
1996	Duke-Durham Neighborhood Partnership begins
1998	Campaign for Duke goes into its public phase with a goal of $1.5 billion
1999	Duke celebrates the 75th anniversary of its founding
2003	Duke's Center for Human Genetics opens in April
2003	Campaign for Duke ends having raised over $2.36 billion
2004	Brodhead inaugurated as ninth president
2004	Fitzpatrick Center (CIEMAS) opens
2004	The Palestinian Solidarity Movement (PSM) holds its annual conference at Duke
2005	Nasher Museum of Art opens
2005	The Rolling Stones play in Wallace Wade Stadium as part of their Bigger Bang world tour
2006	The Duke lacrosse case makes national headlines when a stripper accuses three men's lacrosse players of rape.
2007	The Duke lacrosse case ends with the accuser discredited, the three charged players declared innocent, and the prosecutor who pursued the case being disbarred.
2010	The men's lacrosse team wins its first national title.

== See also ==
- List of Duke University people
