= Duke Memorial United Methodist Church =

Historic church in North Carolina, United States

- U.S. National Register of Historic Places
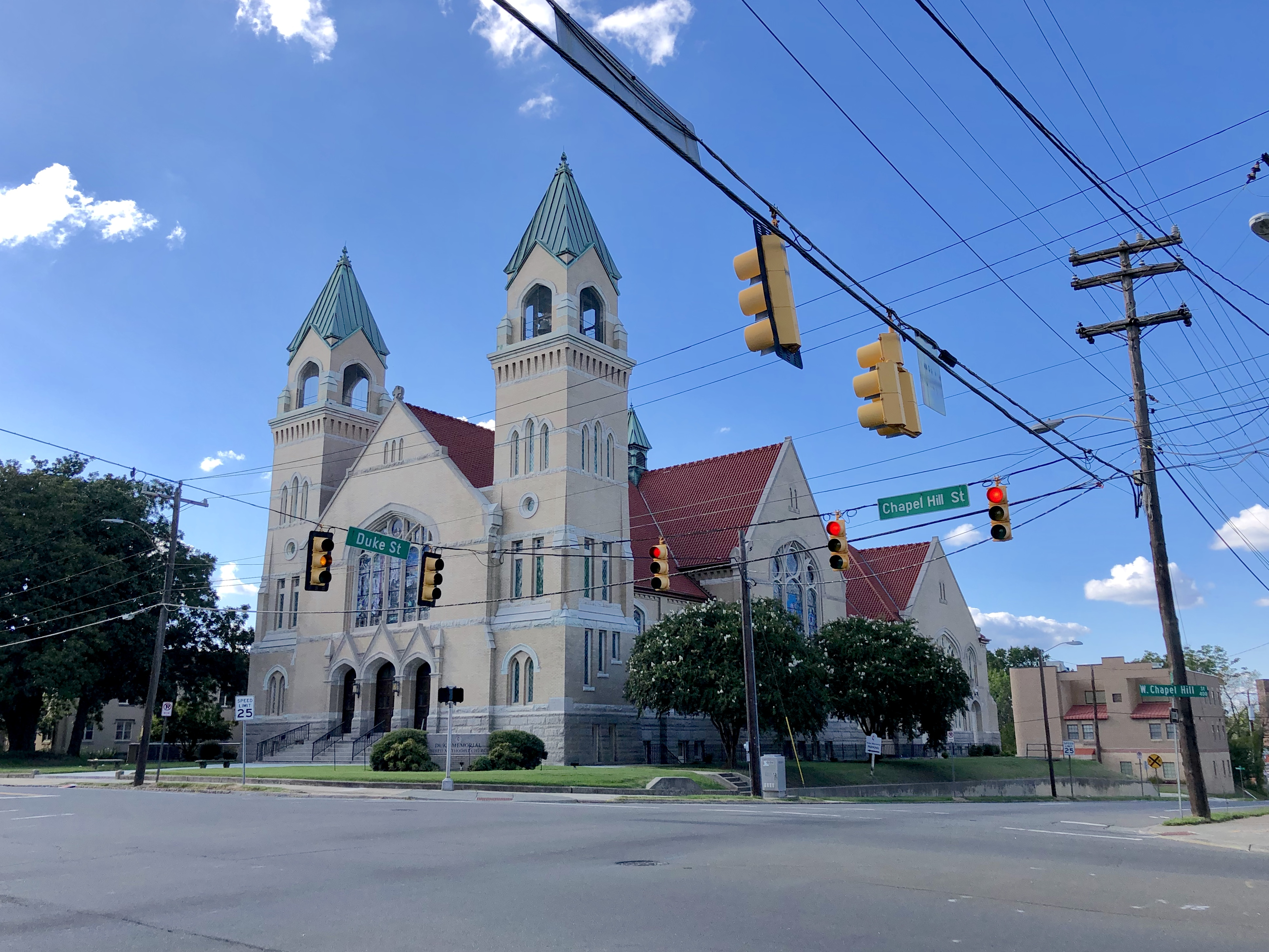
- Duke Memorial United Methodist Church from W Chapel Hill Street

- Location within North Carolina Location within the United States
- Location: 504 W. Chapel Hill St., Durham, North Carolina
- Coordinates: 35°59′51″N 78°54′34″W
- Area: 3 acres (1.2 ha)
- Built: 1907
- Architect: Kramer, George W.; Underwood, Norman
- Architectural style: Gothic, Romanesque
- MPS: Durham MRA
- NRHP reference No.: 85001781
- Added to NRHP: August 11, 1985

Duke Memorial United Methodist Church is a historic Methodist church at 504 W. Chapel Hill Street in Durham, North Carolina. It was originally established in 1886. The congregation's growth paralleled Durham's growth as a manufacturing center in the textile and tobacco industries and has maintained a close connection with Duke University (formerly Trinity College). From its beginning, the church has counted among its members many of Durham's educational and industrial elite. It is named in honor of tobacco magnate and philanthropist Washington Duke and his sons, who were instrumental in the building of the church.

== Main Street Church ==
What would become Duke Memorial United Methodist Church grew out of the original Methodist congregation in Durham. Members of the Durham Methodist church, soon to be renamed Trinity Methodist Church, saw the need for new churches to serve the growing east and west sides of the city. Durham's population was swelling thanks to the rapid growth of cotton and tobacco manufacture in the city. Tobacco firms like Washington Duke, Sons & Co, and W.T. Blackwell & Co. as well as thriving cotton firms like that of Julian Carr were bringing throngs of new workers to the edges of the city. J.J. Ward wrote of Durham in 1884, “I never saw nor heard tell of a town thriving any faster than Durham.”

Maude Wilkerson Dunn, daughter of Durham builder Albert Wilkerson, recalled a meeting between her father and Washington Duke: “Mr. Washington Duke was at our house one day and he said…“We’ve got to build another Church.” The factory was just beginning to go and people were moving in here. From just a mere nothing but a store or two beside the road, it was beginning to become quite a town. So Pap said, “We have Trinity Church.” Mr. Duke said, “Yes, but we’ve got to have one for the masses.” So they began, and Main Street Church was built.”

Industrialists like Washington Duke and Julian Carr did not want Durham to be only a wealthy city; they hoped that Durham would grow into a city which also had culture. Durham at this point was an economic boom-town, with the potential to become a rowdy and unorganized industrial city like many others in the American south and west. Thus they encouraged the founding of institutions of civilized society, like churches and institutions of higher education, to accompany Durham’s material growth. The establishment of Trinity College in Durham and the building of this church are two primary examples.

However, Durham’s elite were not the only religiously excited members of the community. During the latter half of the 1880s, a series of camp-style revival services were held in and around Durham. They drew very large crowds. Sam Jones, a famous evangelist of the day, publicly converted Durham tobacco magnate William T. Blackwell at one such revival. And, although the vast majority of the community remained Protestant, the first Roman Catholic congregation in Durham was established in 1887. The people of Durham, regardless of social or economic standing, were by all measures very religiously active at this time.

In 1885, a few members of Durham Methodist Church formed a building committee to make plans for this “church for the masses,” which was already being called the “West End Church.” The committee included businessmen Washington Duke and J.H. Southgate among others. They approved the establishment of the church and secured some pledges for its construction.

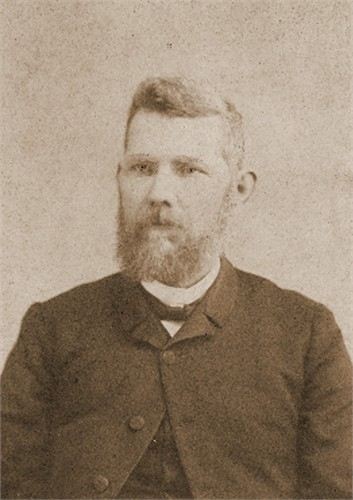
Rev. Amos Gregson, friend of Washington Duke. He was the son of Julius C. & Holland Gregson. Conducted the first services at Washington Duke, Sons & Co Tobacco Factory. Gregson St in Durham NC is named in his honor.

In 1885 The Rev. Amos Gregson was appointed pastor of the West End Church and its companion in the east side of town. The West End Church did not yet have a building, but on May 2, 1886 Gregson conducted the first services at Washington Duke, Sons & Co Tobacco Factory. This new congregation also established the Bethany Sunday School, which became a very successful and well-attended group. Many of Durham's businessmen, like B.N. Duke and C.C. Taylor were active leaders in the Sunday School. Most members of the congregation worked in the factory, but not all; Washington Duke himself and Mr. and Mrs. Brodie L. Duke transferred their membership to the new church.

On October 10, 1886 the Sunday school officially relocated to the new church. The building, measuring 40 × 70 feet and made of red brick, was located on the southeast corner of Main and Gregson Streets. The land was donated by Washington Duke's oldest son, Brodie L. Duke. On April 24 of the following year the Main Street Methodist Church was dedicated with Bishop Charles B. Calloway present for the service. Settled in its new space, the church continued to add members. The church directory from 1889 reports that in that year alone 138 members were added, 29 by certificate of transfer from other congregations and 109 by making first-time professions of faith.

1892 was a momentous year for both the church and Durham. Trinity College, formerly located in Randolph County, North Carolina, was brought to Durham largely thanks to Washington Duke and Julian Carr. Not long after the college's arrival in Durham, it became tightly linked to the Main Street Church. Many of Trinity College's professors were active members of the congregation. Dr. W. I. Cranford, a very well-liked professor of psychology and philosophy, drew many students and church members to his Sunday school class. Professors J.S. Bassett and R.L. Flowers were active members and Sunday School teachers. Dr. John Carlisle Kilgo, a Methodist minister and member of the Church, became president of the college in 1894. He was a frequent guest preacher and served as a bishop in the Methodist Church beginning in 1910.

For the next ten years, the church continued to grow. By 1904, membership was at 640. The church board conducted the business of the church with monthly meetings in the office of W. Duke, Sons & Co. until Washington Duke became too ill to attend. Duke had been instrumental in the visioning and planning for the new church and had remained thoroughly involved until his death in 1905. In many instances when church debt became burdensome, Washington Duke would write a personal check to liquidate the debt rather than have the congregation solicited.

The Main Street congregation began a good library for the use of its members. J.P Breedlove, the Trinity College librarian, helped select and purchase books of all kinds with funds from sympathetic members. A room in the back of the church was outfitted with bookshelves, but soon there was not enough room.

As the congregation ran out of space for its books, so too did it run out of space for its members. As Durham's population rose, church and Sunday school attendance followed. Sunday school classes were overcrowded and the sanctuary could not fit all attendees comfortably. It soon became clear that the Main Street Church building, after only twenty years of service, was no longer able to accommodate its growing congregation. The building was purchased by the Durham Christian Church in 1906. The sanctuary was demolished in 1967, but part of a Sunday school building was maintained for some years as an office building.

== The Memorial Church ==
In the fall of 1906 the building committee for the new church purchased the present site of Duke Memorial UMC, on the northwest corner of Duke and Chapel Hill Streets. The land was purchased from a William T. Blackwell, who was then given ninety days to move his house and his fencing. W. H. McCabe, the church treasurer and building committee chair, reported that “It has been decided, to which the city has consented, to open a new street from Duke to Gregson Street in the rear of the church building.” Today, this is Memorial Street.

Work began on the new church's foundation on January 1, 1907. As building commenced, the name of the congregation was changed from “Main Street Methodist Episcopal Church, South” to “Memorial Methodist Episcopal Church, South.” On April 28 the church established a contract with Mr. N. Underwood, a Durham contractor. Mr. George W. Kramer of New York City was secured as the architect and produced the schematics for the new building. At the church conference of May 20, 1907, the building committee reported its plans: “the new building shall be of stone, gothic in style, and to cost about $90,000.” James B. and Benjamin N. Duke both pledged $30,000. Large pledges were also secured for an organ and set of chimes.

The building was first used for a Sunday service on July 19, 1908, though the service was held in the Sunday school auditorium as the sanctuary was not yet completed. Membership was at 498. It was not until June 2, 1912 that the sanctuary could be used for the Sunday service. On that day, membership stood at an impressive 709 members and almost the same for the Sunday school.

As was the case with Main Street Church, Trinity College was a central part of the church. When Trinity College became Duke University in 1924, the tie remained. The presence of faculty was astounding. Presidents J.C. Kilgo, William Preston Few, R.L. Flowers, and Arthur Hollis Edens were all members of the church. The overwhelming presence of university faculty is one example of the church's importance among Durham's more educated and wealthier residents. But Trinity college students were also present; they overwhelmed the Sunday school. In 1926, the opening of Duke's School of Religion would be celebrated with a formal convocation service at the church. This was not a secular school of comparative religion. Christian hymns like “The Church’s One Foundation” and “God of Our Fathers” were sung, and the Rev. Edward D. Mouzon, Bishop of the Methodist Episcopal Church, South gave a “charge to the school of religion” on behalf of the church. The pastor of Memorial Church, The Rev. Harry C. Smith, also participated. Over twenty of the church's pastors have been educated at Trinity College or Duke University.

By June 1913, church members held a meeting to deal with the remaining building debt. Much in the spirit of his father, B.N. Duke offered to liquidate the remaining $19,000 of debt if the church members would raise enough to pay the $7,000 in interest and the cost of completing the basement. Later that week, on June 7, 1914, the church was dedicated with now Bishop J.C. Kilgo giving the sermon.

James B. Duke died in October 1925. Shortly thereafter the administrative board approved another name change, adopting the name “Duke Memorial Methodist Episcopal Church, South.” The resolution, made by N. Underwood and seconded by Dr. William Preston Few, cited the large role Washington Duke had played in the building of Main Street Church and the role his sons played in building the new church. It reads in part “through the years since the change of name of Main Street Church to Memorial it has been generally understood as a memorial to Mr. Washington Duke and the Duke family…” On January 8, 1929 B.N. Duke died in New York City. A special train brought his body back to Durham, where he lay in state in Duke Chapel before a funeral at Duke Memorial Methodist Church. His funeral services, “marked by simplicity,” were attended by thousands. The church was filled to capacity. The Washington Post reported that “several of his favorite hymns were sung by a picked choir…and Dr. John R. Stanbury, pastor of the church, made brief remarks.”

From 1930-1931 a new elementary building for the Sunday school was built in the same style as the church. In 1939 the church's name became “Duke Memorial Methodist Church,” with the union of the Methodist Episcopal Church and the Methodist Episcopal Church, South in 1939. In 1963 the church began work on an entirely new education building. The groundbreaking was conducted by Barbara Biddle Trent and James Duke Biddle Trent Semans, great-great-grandchildren of Washington Duke. The education building was opened formally on August 23, 1964, and with that the church was made as it exists today.

The last change of name came in 1968, to “Duke Memorial United Methodist Church,” as the Methodist Church and the Evangelical United Brethren Churches joined to become the United Methodist Church. The congregation is still active and participates in many ministries in the Durham community.

== The Duke Family ==
The church's new name after 1925 cleared up any ambiguity: this church owed its existence to the Duke family.

James B. Duke was said to have remarked “My daddy [Washington Duke] always said that if he ever amounted to anything in life it was due to the Methodist circuit riders who frequently visited him in his home and whose preaching and counsel brought out the best in him. If I ever amount to anything in this world, I owe it to my daddy and the Methodist church.”

Washington Duke took his personal faith seriously, and it motivated much of his philanthropy. In an 1890 letter addressed to a group of black workers, he wrote “I am what I am because God was with me; because God goes before me.” As an embodiment of his faith, he hoped to provide for the spiritual well-being of those who worked in his tobacco factory and the broader Durham community. A feature on Duke in the Durham Recorder on April 16, 1900 reports, “Mr. Duke says that since he was twelve years old it has been his aim to help in making the world better by having lived in it. That giving to the support of the gospel has been a part of his life…He has ever tried to carry the religion idea all the way through.” Washington Duke carried the religion idea through in eminently practical ways, generously giving to churches and institutions of education. He was instrumental in the building of Main Street Church and its operation until his death in May 1905. In the 1889 church directory, six Duke family members were on the roll as members, including James B., B.N., and Sarah P. Duke. Of the seven members of the board of trustees, three were Washington Duke, Brodie L. Duke, and B.N. Duke. Both Washington and B.N. were officers in the Sunday school as well.

Outside of the church, Washington Duke made the single largest gift of money to education by one man in North Carolina up to that point with his $500,000 donation to Trinity College. As Durham became a modern city, men like Washington Duke hoped to build a better community by means of religious activity and education. He was lauded for embodying in his personal life the same “old-issue Methodist” values of hard work and personal piety he hoped to promote with his philanthropy. He memorably advised the same group of black workers, “Only by living a God-fearing, honest, sober, and industrious life can you be happy.”

Washington Duke's sons carried on his legacy in many ways. Although the Duke family always made special providence for Main Street Church and Memorial Church, they also gave generously to other congregations, often Methodist churches in rural North Carolina villages. They frequently gave money for the most routine repairs to church buildings, but also to help establish new congregations. B.N. Duke was especially interested in these church starts and expansions. He provided money for at least two other churches in Durham, including Magnum Street Methodist church, and countless others throughout the state.

The Memorial Church Messenger from September 1915 reports:

Mr. J.B. Duke has recently added another to his many gifts, and this time it is to North Carolina Methodism. It is an annual donation in three parts; the first is fifteen thousand dollars to Church Extension, to aid in building churches at weak points; the second is ten thousand dollars for Home Missions, to help on the salaries of men at weak places; the third is ten thousand for the old preachers who have served their day in the ranks and are not more able to work…Many benefited by these donations will have good reason to thank Mr. Duke.

In 1924, James B. Duke established the Duke Endowment with $40 million. This not only established Duke University as it is known today, but he set a given percent of the endowment's income to be used to meet the annual donation he established in 1915. This included the funding of building rural churches and orphanages in the state. The Duke Endowment continues to support Methodist churches in North Carolina and their clergy as well as a number of institutions of higher education.

Their older brother Brodie L. Duke made significant donations of land to both Main Street Church and for a parsonage for the presiding elder of Durham's district. He also donated land for a no-longer existent church called Cuninggim Methodist Church. Generations of Dukes have continued their families support for the church financially and in attendance, including Angier Duke and Mary Duke Biddle, the prolific children of B.N. Duke. Dixon clarifies the role of the Duke family in the life of the church: “Church records contain many references to the Dukes’ interest and largesse...on numerous occasions Washington or James, Benjamin or Mary Duke Biddle (or someone else of Duke descent) opened a checkbook and helped the church meet a crisis.” Even without a crisis, the passion that Washington Duke and his descendants had for the success of this church and others in Durham is clear. The Durham Recorder claimed that Washington Duke was a truly generous man because “he does not always have to be begged and appealed to to aid in a good cause.” Indeed, within Durham, the Dukes proactively supported the establishment of churches and institutions of higher education. But the Dukes were strongly convicted of their Methodism, and Washington Duke and his sons continued to support the larger Methodist Church in North Carolina.

Duke Memorial United Methodist Church reflects the Duke family's financial support of the Methodist Church.

== Building ==
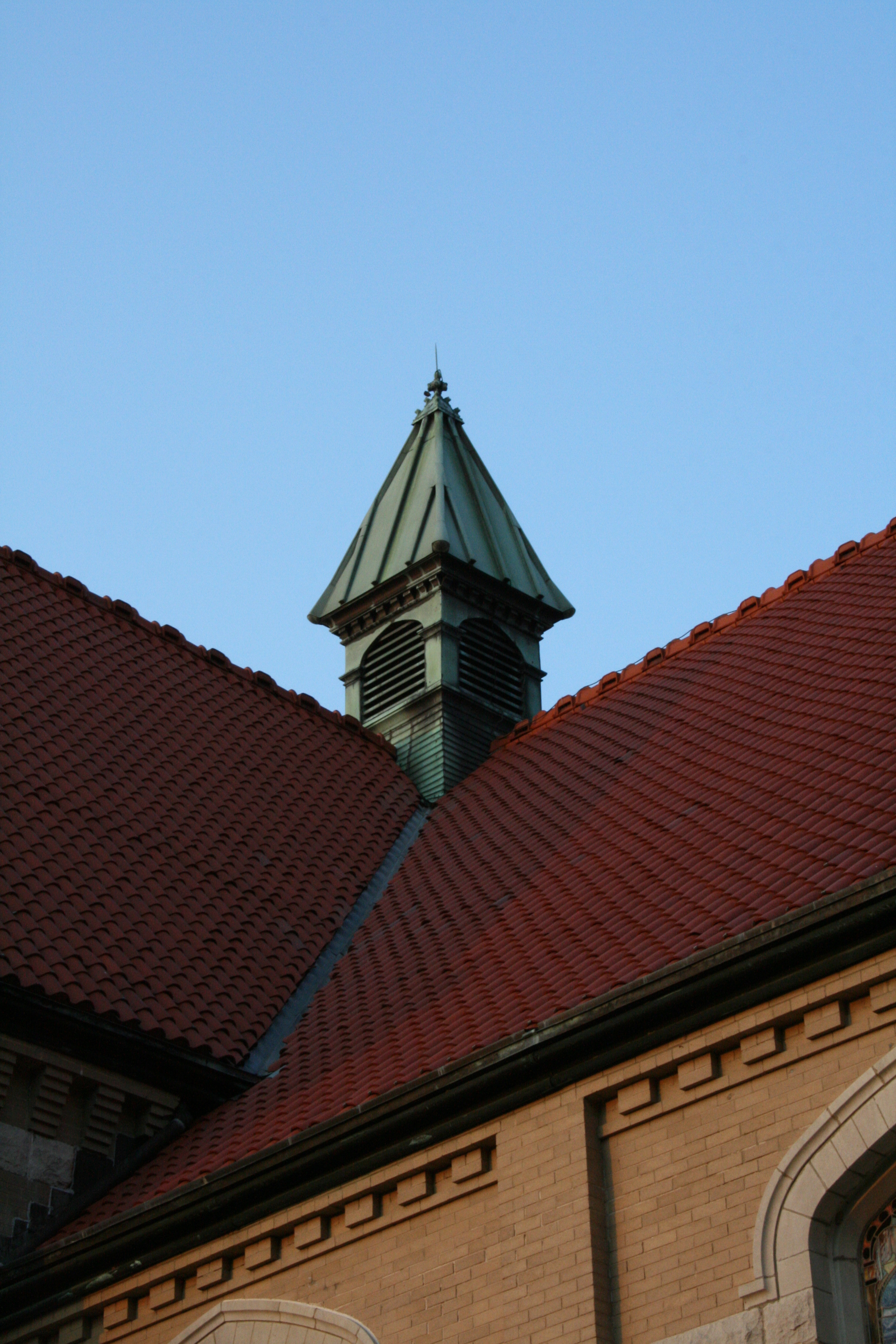
Steeple

The building's frame is supported by steel girders and trusses. The exterior is made of white pressed brick with granite trimming, contrary to the original plans for a gothic structure of stone. It rests on a granite foundation and is roofed with red terra cotta. The style of the building is Gothic Revival, most clearly demonstrated in the stonework around the entrance and the windows. The brickwork of the two four-story towers, however, is in the Romanesque Revival style. One of the towers has an active 10-bell chime.

The two-story sanctuary is cruciform and decorated with Gothic Revival woodwork. The ornamental bracings imitate Gothic support structures as they conceal the steel beams. The two subsequent additions, the elementary building (1931) and the education building (1963), are connected to the sanctuary by a breezeway and have the same Gothic Revival exterior.

The church's stained glass windows, installed in 1911, are of note. Bishop John C. Kilgo worked with the firm of Joseph V. Llorens Sr. on the plans. All of the windows, except for one, depict men and women in the Bible and scenes from the life of Christ. The exception is the massive window facing Chapel Hill St. (in the rear of the sanctuary), which depicts John Wesley preaching on his father's tomb after being denied the right to preach in the Epworth (England) church.

In 1970-71, the sanctuary was renovated and a new organ by Walter Holtkamp was installed. In 1982, the carillon tower was renovated. A shop in East Durham reworked the bells and a firm in Cincinnati overhauled the playing mechanism. In January 1986, the church was named to the National Register of Historic Places.
