= Duke Chapel =

Church building in North Carolina, United States of America

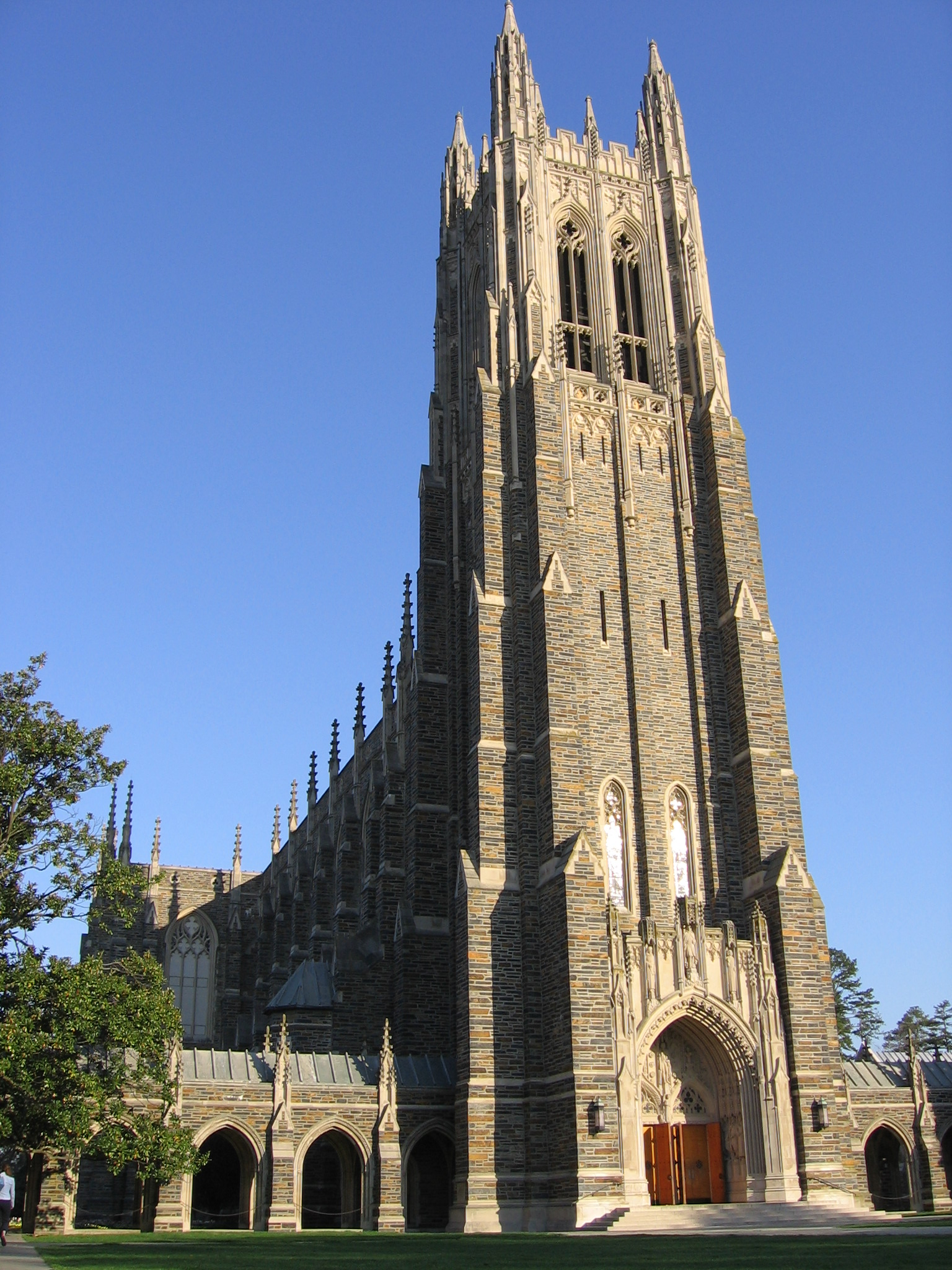
- Interactive map of the Duke Chapel area

General information
- Type: Center of Duke's Campus
- Architectural style: Collegiate Gothic
- Location: West Campus, Duke University
- Coordinates: 36°0′5.99″N 78°56′23.32″W
- Completed: 1935
- Cost: US$2.3 million

Design and construction
- Architects: Julian Abele and Horace Trumbauer

Other information
- Seating capacity: 1800

Website
- Duke Chapel website

Duke University Chapel is a chapel located at the center of the campus of Duke University in Durham, North Carolina, United States. It is an ecumenical Christian or all-faith chapel and the center of religion at Duke, and has connections to the United Methodist Church. Finished in 1935, the chapel seats about 1,800 people and stands 210 feet (64 m) tall, making it one of the tallest buildings in Durham County. It is built in the Collegiate Gothic style, characterized by its large stones, pointed arches, and ribbed vaults. It has a 50-bell carillon and three pipe organs, one with 5,033 pipes and another with 6,900 pipes.

The chapel stands at the center of the university, on the highest ridge of Duke University's West Campus. Although plans for a chapel were first made in April 1925, the cornerstone was not laid until October 22, 1930. When it was completed in 1935 at a cost of $2.3 million, the chapel was the last of the original buildings to be built on West Campus. It was first used during Commencement in 1932 while it was still under construction, though it would not be formally finished and dedicated until June 2, 1935. Stained-glass windows and other details were installed at a later date. The chapel was designed by Julian Abele, a noted African-American architect who designed much of Duke's west campus and who was also chief designer for the Philadelphia firm of Horace Trumbauer.

As of 2024, the dean of the chapel is the Rev. Luke A. Powery. On May 11, 2015, the chapel closed for a year due to necessary restoration work on the ceiling. The chapel reopened May 11, 2016.

== Exterior ==
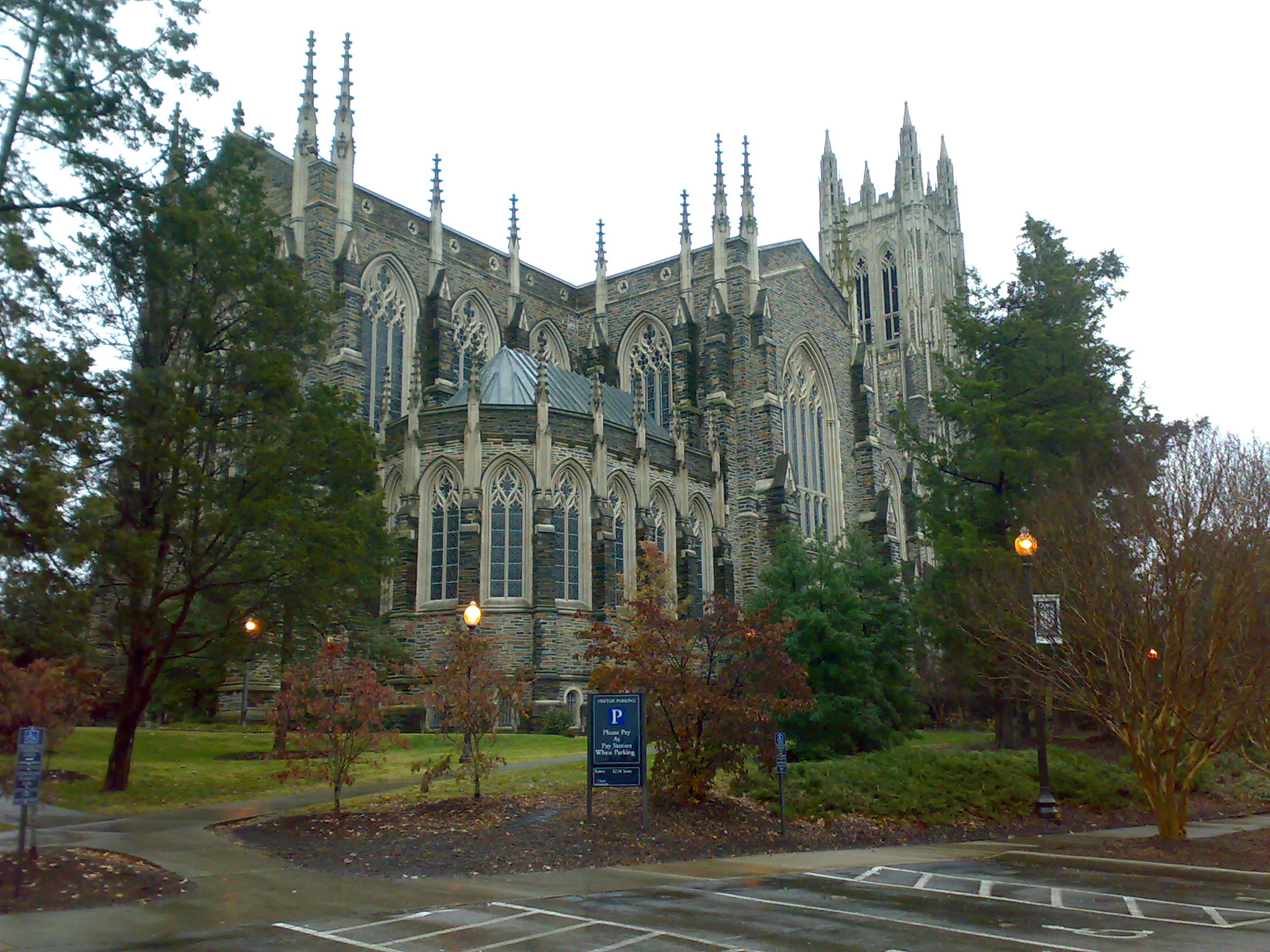
Rear view of chapel

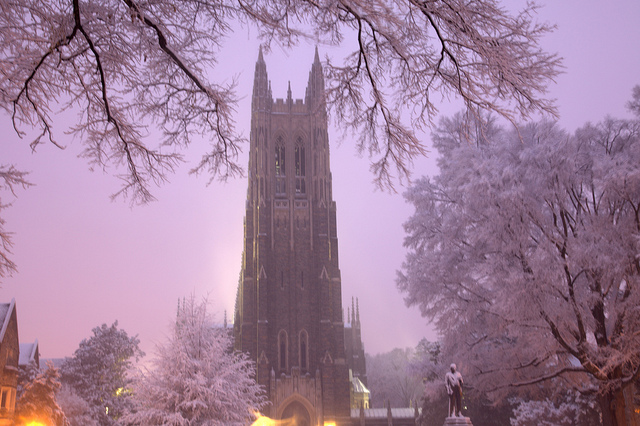
The chapel stands tall in the early morning sky

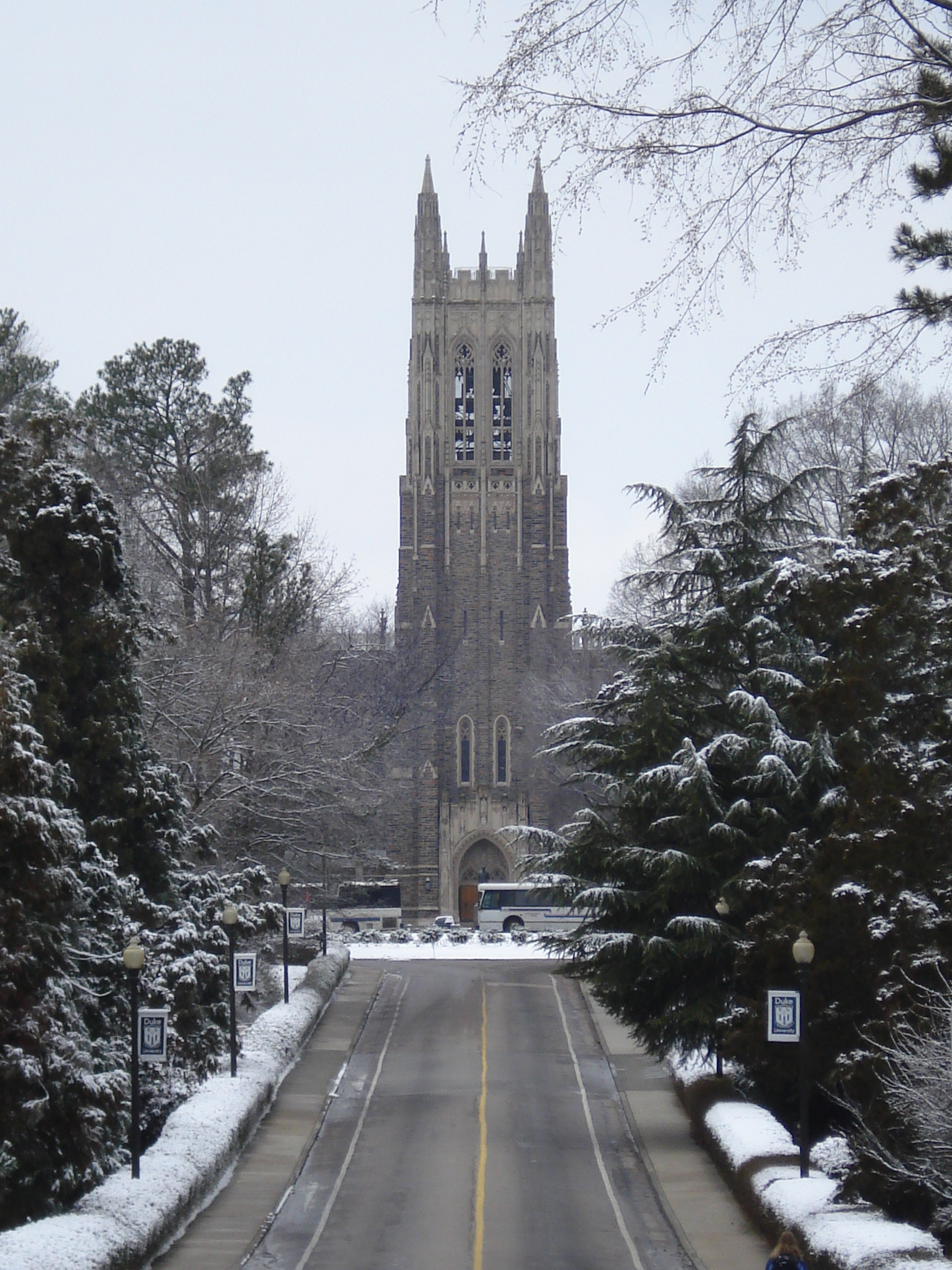
Duke Chapel in winter

=== Entrance portal ===
Carved on the ornate entrance to the chapel are ten figures important to Methodism, Protestantism, and the American South. On the outer arch above the portal are carved three figures pivotal to the American Methodist movement: Bishop Francis Asbury stands in the center, while Bishop Thomas Coke and George Whitefield stand on the left and right, respectively. On the left wall within the entrance portal are carved (from left to right) Girolamo Savonarola, Martin Luther, and John Wycliffe.

On the right wall (from left to right) are Thomas Jefferson, statesman of the South; Robert E. Lee, soldier of the South; and Sidney Lanier, poet of the South. John Wesley, founder of Methodism, stands atop the inner arch within the portal, directly above the chapel doors.

These figures were carved by employees of the contractor, the John Donnelly company. According to "Duke lore," the architects gave Donnelly the choice of which figures to represent, which he did after consulting with an unnamed Vanderbilt professor.

On Lee's carving, the belt buckle was initially inscribed 'USA' rather than 'CSA' for Confederate States of America; it was partially chiseled away but was still visible. The university removed the statue of Lee from the entrance after it was vandalized in August 2017 as part of nationwide protests against Confederate memorials. Duke later announced that the space will remain empty with the hope that it will "evoke this moment in history".

=== Bell tower ===
The bell tower of Duke Chapel is modeled after the Bell Harry Tower of Canterbury Cathedral. It is 210 feet (64 m) tall and 38 feet (12 m) square at its base. Like the rest of the edifice, its main body is constructed of stone from the Duke Quarry near Hillsborough, North Carolina, while its upper trimmings are of limestone from Bedford, Indiana. Housed in the tower is a 50-bell carillon, a gift from The Duke Endowment. The heaviest bell, G-natural, weighs 11,200 pounds, and the lightest weighs 10.5 pounds.

A service elevator and a winding staircase of 239 steps provide access to the top. The bell tower is not open to the public, and restricted for Duke University students to special times during Orientation and Graduation.

== Interior ==
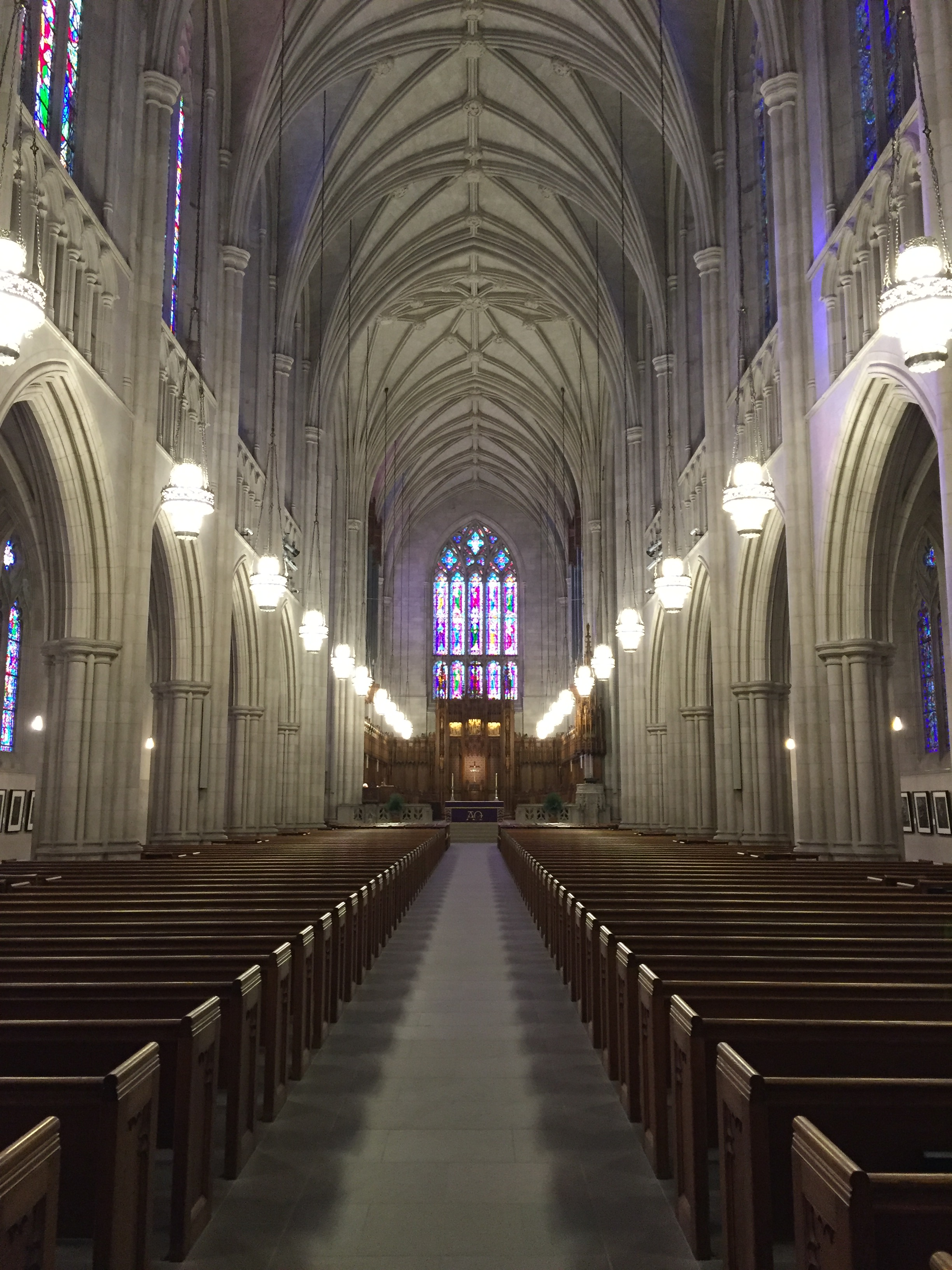
Interior of Duke Chapel

Duke Chapel, like many Christian churches and cathedrals, is cruciform, with a nave that measures 291 feet (89 m) long, 63 feet (19 m) wide, and 73 feet (22 m) high. The walls and vaults of the nave and transepts are constructed from Guastavino tile and were sealed in 1976 to increase sound reverberation and enhance the sound of the organ. The chapel also houses a Memorial Chapel and a crypt.

=== Stained-glass windows ===
The 77 Chapel windows were designed and constructed over a three-year period by 15 artists and craftsmen, including S. Charles Jaekle of G. Owen Bonawit, Inc. They are constructed from over one million pieces of glass, imported from England, France, and Belgium and varying in thickness between 1/8 and 3/16 inch. The largest window measures 17.5 by 38 feet (12 m), and the smallest measures just 14 by 20 inches (510 mm).

The windows depict scenes and characters from the Bible; of the 800 or 900 figures represented in the windows, 301 are larger than life-size. The large, upper clerestory windows along the nave and chancel depict scenes from the Old Testament, while the smaller medallion windows along the walls of the nave aisles represent scenes from the New Testament. Both Old and New Testament images are present in the two large transept windows as well as the altar window. The windows of the narthex depict women of the Old Testament, and the small windows of the two small entrance halls on either side of the narthex contain six scenes from the life of Jesus painted in black on amber glass. The windows of the Memorial Chapel are made from silver-tinted grisaille glass, and those in the crypt are of purple glass framed in lead grilles.

=== Chancel ===
Duke Chapel's chancel contains the altar, the choir stalls, the pulpit, and the lectern. Patriarchs, apostles, saints, and other religious figures carved in limewood, and oak appear in the niches of the choir stalls and in the decorative screen behind the altar. Scenes from the Passion are carved into the north and south walls of the chancel.

=== Organs ===
Duke Chapel houses three large pipe organs, each constructed in a different style, which are used for religious services, ceremonies, recitals, and the study of organ performance. Additionally, a portable "box" organ belongs to the chapel and accompanies small groups and organizations.

The Kathleen McClendon Organ is Duke Chapel's original organ and is lodged behind ornate oak screens in two chambers on either side of the chancel and in front of both transepts. Built in 1932, it was the last major instrument made by the Aeolian Organ Company before the company merged to form the Aeolian-Skinner Organ Company. 6,900 pipes, controlled by four manual keyboards and a pedal keyboard, provide a wide range of dynamic expression and orchestral voicing for the organ's individual stops. The organ was fully restored by Foley-Baker Inc. of Tolland, Connecticut, in 2009. Broome & Company of Connecticut restored the existing reed stops and added a new unenclosed Festival Trumpet.

The Benjamin N. Duke Memorial Organ, dedicated in 1976, was built by the Dutch Flentrop Company in the 18th century styles of Dutch and French organs. Housed in the arch between the narthex and the nave, it contains 5,033 pipes controlled by four keyboards and a pedal keyboard. The organ's main case, in which most of the pipes are housed, is built of solid mahogany and decorated with various colors and gold leaf. 40 feet (12 m) tall and 4.5 feet (1.4 m) deep, the main case is situated on a solid oak balcony overlooking the nave.

The Brombaugh Organ, installed in 1997 in a "swallow's nest" gallery of the Memorial Chapel, was the last organ to be added to the chapel. It is a two manual and pedal organ of 960 pipes, modeled in the style of Renaissance Italian instruments. It produces a gentle, sparkling tone with very low wind pressure, and like instruments of the 16th and 17th centuries, it is tuned in meantone temperament. The Duke family crest can be seen at the top of the organ case.

== Memorial Chapel ==
A Memorial Chapel was later added to the left of the chapel by the Duke Memorial Association. Intended as a place for reflection and prayer, the Memorial Chapel is open to visitors, and is separated from the rest of the chapel by large iron gates. Along the left wall, the university's benefactors—Washington Duke and his two sons, James B. Duke and Benjamin N. Duke—are entombed in three 30-ton, white Carrara marble sarcophagi carved by Charles Keck. Over the altar are three limewood figures: Jesus stands in the center, with St. Paul on the left and St. Peter on the right. A boss with the Duke family coat of arms graces the ceiling.

=== Crypt ===
Several important people of Duke University are interred in the crypt directly beneath the Memorial Chapel, including three presidents of the university: William Preston Few (1924–1940), Julian Deryl Hart (1960–1963) with his wife Mary Johnson Hart, and Terry Sanford (1969–1985) with his wife Margaret Rose Sanford. The wife of James B. Duke, Nanaline Holt Duke, is also buried in the crypt, as are James A. Thomas, Chairman of the Duke Memorial Association, and James T. Cleland, former Dean of Duke Chapel, with his wife Alice Mead Cleland.

Two plaques on the walls of the crypt commemorate university presidents Arthur Hollis Edens (1949–1960) and Robert Lee Flowers (1941–1948).

== Relative size ==
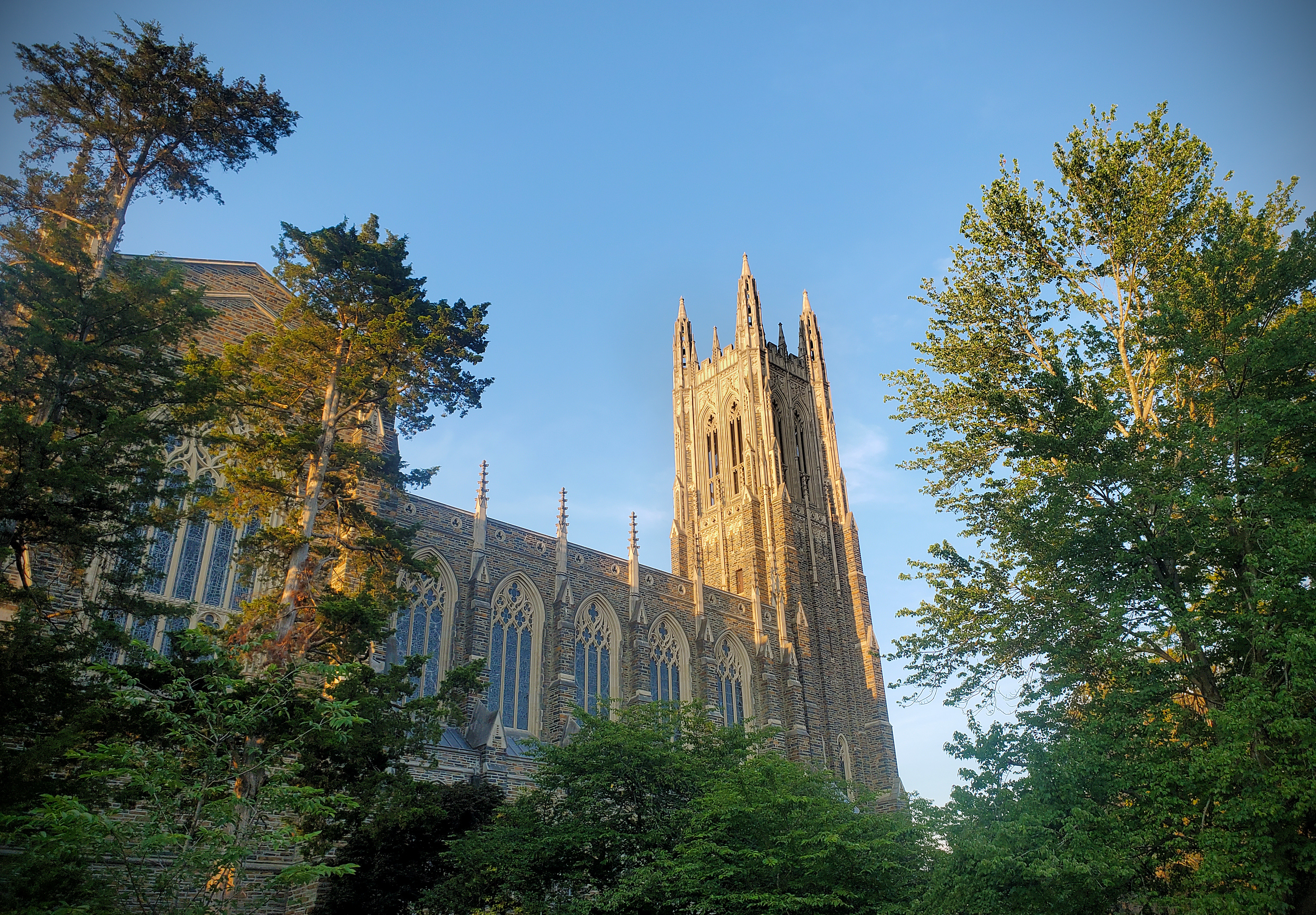
The chapel tower, its tallest structure

At 210 feet, the Duke University Chapel is one of the tallest university chapels in the world along with the Basilica of the Sacred Heart at the University of Notre Dame (218 feet).

== Robert E. Lee statue vandalization and removal ==
On August 16 and 17, 2017, in the wake of the Unite the Right rally in Charlottesville, Virginia, and subsequent calls for the removal of Confederate monuments and memorials across the United States, the 85-year-old statue of Robert E. Lee in the chapel's entrance portal was defaced: the statue's face was damaged, and its nose chipped off. Research showed that "an unnamed Vanderbilt University professor" worked with John Donnelly, who designed the chapel's ornamental stonework, to install the statue in the first half of the 1930s, but that "[t]he documents do not fully explain how the statue came to be included in the Chapel." A week after the events in Charlottesville, Duke University president Vincent Price approved the removal of the statue. Announcing the removal in an August 19 email to students, staff, faculty and alumni, Price promised to preserve the statue "so that students can study Duke's complex past and take part in a more inclusive future."

As of April 2025, the space occupied by Robert E. Lee has yet to be filled with a new statue.

== See also ==
- Collegiate Gothic
- Gothic Revival architecture
