= Kilgo =

Kilgo is a surname. Notable people with this surname include:

- Darius Kilgo (born 1991), American American football player
- John Carlisle Kilgo (1861–1922), American Methodist bishop
