= Robert Flowers =

Robert Flowers may refer to:

- Robert B. Flowers, U.S. Army general
- Robert C. Flowers (1917–1962), American football player
- Robert Lee Flowers (1870–1951), American academic and former president of Duke University
- Trey Flowers (Robert Lee Flowers III) (born 1993), American football player

== See also ==
- Robert Flower (1955–2014), Australian rules footballer
- Robert Thomas Flower, 8th Viscount Ashbrook
