= Gannaway =

Gannaway is a surname. Notable people with the surname include:

- Bobs Gannaway (born 1965), American writer, producer, director, and actor
- Gary Gannaway (born 1954), American businessman, entrepreneur, and philanthropist
- Preston Gannaway, American photojournalist
- William Trigg Gannaway (1825–1902), American academic
