= Omie Wise =

American murder victim (1789–1808)

- Born: 1789
- Died: 1808 (1807 in other sources)
- Cause of death: murder
- Resting place: Providence Quaker Church Cemetery, Randolph County, North Carolina
- Other name: Naomi or Nayomy Wise
- Known for: namesake of a murder ballad

Omie Wise or Naomi Wise (1789–1808) was an American murder victim who is remembered by a popular murder ballad about her death.

== Song ==
Omie Wise's death became the subject of a traditional American ballad (Roud 447). One version opens:

Oh, listen to my story, I'll tell you no lies,
How John Lewis did murder poor little Omie Wise.

In accordance with the broadside ballad tradition, lyrics to the original version of the song were written shortly after the murder itself; at least one 19th-century version of the ballad text exists. The first recorded version of the song was performed by G. B. Grayson, who recorded the song in 1927 in Atlanta, Georgia. The first person to record the song under the title "Naomi Wise" was Vernon Dalhart, who did so on November 24, 1925.

The song is thematically related to other American murder ballads such as "Banks of the Ohio" and "The Knoxville Girl". Each of these songs relates the tale of a woman murdered by her lover, who then disposed of her body in a river.

The song has been performed by Doc Watson, who learned the song from his mother. Watson relates that "Naomi Wise, a little orphan girl, was being brought up by Squire Adams, a gent who had a pretty good name in the community as a morally decent human being. Omie, however, was seeing a ne'er-do-well named John Lewis, who never meant anything about anything serious, except some of his meanness. John Lewis courted the girl, seemingly until she became pregnant, and he decided that he'd get rid of her in some secret sort of way. He persuaded her to skip off with him and get married, then pushed her into the water and drowned her. Everyone knew that he had been mean to Omie, and when the body was taken out of the water, there was evidence that she had been beaten quite a lot."

Performers who have recorded versions of this song include Doc Watson, Tim Eriksen, Clarence Ashley, Dock Boggs, Roscoe Holcomb, Shirley Collins, Judy Henske (Henske's version is titled "The Ballad of Little Romy"), Pentangle, Scott H. Biram, Greg Graffin, Kate & Anna McGarrigle, Okkervil River, Cécile McLorin Salvant, Snakefarm, Bert Jansch, Clifton Hicks, Jim Moray, and David Baerwald. Bob Dylan also performed the song; a live bootleg recording exists of his performance at the Riverside Church Folk Music Hootenanny in 1961.

== Fiction ==
Little is known about the real Omie Wise, but records indicate that she was an orphan girl who was taken in by William Adams and his wife Mary Adams in Randolph County, North Carolina. At the Adams' farmhouse, Jonathan Lewis, son of Richard Lewis, met Naomi. Naomi and Jonathan Lewis became lovers quickly, but Jonathan was advised by his mother to pursue Hettie Elliott, whose family was "in good standing" both socially and financially. Naomi found out about Jonathan's courtship to Ms. Elliott, and although jilted, did not stop their affair.

The day itself cannot be determined, but it is said that in April 1808, Naomi went missing. Mr. Adams gathered a search party and followed the horse tracks to now Randleman, North Carolina, where they found Naomi Wise's body in the river. Mrs. Ann Davis, a resident close to the water, confirmed that she had heard a woman screaming the night before. The coroner from Asheboro examined the drowned and battered body of Naomi and found her pregnant.

Jonathan Lewis was found and taken to jail, where he escaped a month later. As the notoriety of the case grew, many members of the Lewis family began to move out of North Carolina and settled in Kentucky, where Jonathan Lewis himself was said to have started a family six years after Naomi's death. Word of Lewis's whereabouts reached Randolph County; the citizens demanded he be apprehended. Jonathan Lewis was found and placed in jail once more. His trial was moved from Randolph County to Guilford County in 1815. He was found not guilty, despite witnesses and evidence, and was free to return to Kentucky. Five years later, in 1820, Jonathan Lewis was said to have died of an illness, confessing to the murder of Naomi Wise on his deathbed.

== Sources ==
The first written account of this murder story was by Braxton Craven, under the pen name of Charlie Vernon. It first appeared in two installments of the January and February, 1851 editions of the Evergreen newspaper in North Carolina. It was reprinted several times until 1962. Folks came from miles around to visit Naomi's grave and the city of Randleman named streets, churches, mills and manufacturing plants after Naomi Wise.

In 1954, Manly Wade Wellman enhanced Craven's story with his book titled Dead and Gone. The story is based on the death of Naomi Wise and the arrest of Jonathan Lewis but all else is fiction.

== Facts ==
The following was extracted from an article titled "The Historical Events Behind the Celebrated Ballad "Naomi Wise" by Robert Roote, published by the North Carolina Folklore Journal, Vol. 32, No. 2, of the Fall-Winter 1984 edition.

- The Randolph County Superior Court Minutes of March 20, 1807, recorded: "The Grand Jury returned a bill to the Court against Jonathan Lewis for Murder & indorsed thereon a trial bill upon which the said Jonathan Lewis was arraigned, plead not guilty and put himself upon his country." Witnesses for both sides were summoned and a trial date of October 26, 1807, was set in the Guilford County Superior Court. Jonathan was arrested on April 8 and locked in the Randolph County jail. A pre-trial hearing was held October 5 and he was indicted for the murder of Omi Wise, a single woman. On October 9, he escaped the jail and fled to parts unknown.
- Several men, including the Sheriff, Isaac Lane, were arrested for aiding Jonathan's escape. The sheriff was cleared of guilt on a motion of nolo prosequi (do not proceed) because he was instrumental in returning Jonathan to the Orange County jail in the fall of 1811. Others were imprisoned until Governor William Hawkins granted executive clemency to William Fields, John Lewis, Ebenezer Reynolds and John Green on December 17, 1811.
- Jonathan remained in jail from his recapture in the fall of 1811 until November 20, 1813. Records show that he was in the custody of the Orange County Jailer and eventually transferred to Randolph County. In October, 1812 Randolph County Superior Court Clerk, Thomas Caldwell, accepted 500 pounds as bail bond from Jeremiah Fields and Thomas Kirkman.
- A year later, on October 4, 1813, Jonathan Lewis finally went to trial... for escaping jail, not the murder of Naomi Wise. The jury delivered a verdict against Jonathan; it found: The Defendant Guilty of breaking Jail & rescuing himself as charged in the bill of Indictment, but Not guilty as to the rescuing of Moses Smith (a fellow prisoner) from legal confinement: Judgment of the Court that the Defendant pay a fine of Ten Pounds and costs & be imprisoned thirty days.

Lewis spent 47 days in jail because he was unable to pay the fine and court costs. On November 20, 1813, he was issued the Oath of an Insolvent Debtor, relieved of his debt and set free.

=== Naomi Wise ===
In 2003, Eleanor R. Long-Wilgus wrote Naomi Wise, Creation, Re-Creation and Continuity in an American Ballad Tradition. Her book dissects folk music in general and the "Omie Wise" ballad in particular. Within the book she included a long narrative poem entitled "A true account of Nayomy Wise" written by a young girl, Mary Woody, born in 1801 in North Carolina. The handwritten poem was found in a commonplace book that had been donated by Mrs. Thomas B. Williamson in 1952 to the UCLA Research Library. To understand the poem Long-Wilgus studied the law, traditions and history of the early 19th century in North Carolina. Her research presents a very different Naomi than that described in the song. According to the poem, Naomi Wise was not a teenager and was several years older than Jonathan. Additionally, she was said to have had two previous children out of wedlock: Henry age 4, and Nancy age 9. Long-Wilgus describes mothers of illegitimate children as having had no expectation of marriage. Bastardy bonds would be posted in the courts to provide for the child's upbringing. Some women would agree to name another man responsible for a pregnancy in court in return for a gift of money and/or other "fine things" (as promised by John Lewis according to the song).

=== Jonathan Lewis ===
Jonathan Lewis was born April 23, 1783, in Randolph County, North Carolina, the second child of Richard Lewis and Lydia Field. On March 30, 1811, Jonathan Lewis married Sarah McCain in Clark County, Indiana. They had two children: Priscilla, born March 4, 1812, and Thomas Willis, born September 1816. Jonathan died of unknown causes on April 25, 1817.
