= Giles sisters =

Pioneers in women's education

Mary, Theresa, and Persis Giles were schoolteachers and pioneers in women's education. They were from rural North Carolina and were the first female graduates of the Trinity College of Arts and Sciences (later Duke University) in 1878, well before the school formally admitted women. In 1885 they founded the Greenwood Female College in Greenwood, South Carolina.

== Early life and family ==
The Giles sisters were born in Jones County, North Carolina to E.S.F. and Nancy White Giles. E.S.F. had been a minister of the Church of Christ, and a farmer. A brother, James, was killed during the Civil War, and their father, E.S.F. Sr. died in 1868. The sisters also had a surviving brother, E.S.F. Jr., and a younger sister called Sue.

In 1874, Nancy Giles moved the family from Richlands, North Carolina to Trinity in Randolph County. The move was prompted by the loss of land and slave holdings at the end of the Civil War, but the primary purpose for the move was that Nancy Giles was determined to have her surviving son get an education. Theresa, Persis, and Mary were all schoolteachers by occupation, and were working in Onslow County, when the rest of the family moved to Trinity. They joined the family in Trinity when their contracts expired.

== Life in Trinity ==
Trinity College of Arts and Sciences (later Duke University) was located in Trinity, North Carolina, in rural Randolph County until 1892 when it moved to Durham (where it is located now). When the Giles sisters arrived, there was little to the community apart from the college. Trinity was an all-male college and remained so until 1892.

In Trinity, Theresa, Mary, and Persis at first continued to teach in the local schools. Meanwhile, their younger brother, E.S.F. Jr. attended Trinity College. The sisters attempted to enroll when they arrived in town, but were not allowed. Mary later reflected on this moment, saying "Trinity was a male school and we were barred."

Initially, the sisters had their younger brother tutor them in the evenings when he returned home. It soon became evident, however, that he would not be able to answer all of their questions, having just learned the material himself. Insistent on learning what their brother was, they contacted a neighbor and professor at Trinity, Lemuel Johnson, who agreed to tutor them after-hours. In turn, other professors at Trinity did the same, and taught them exactly the same lessons that the men at Trinity learned. They did attend one class with the men, metaphysics, taught by then-President Braxton Craven.

When the sisters lost all of their savings following the collapse of a bank in Greensboro, they were forced to go back to teaching in order to raise the money to pay tuition for their tutors (they paid the same amount in tuition as the male students at Trinity paid). They each taught in surrounding communities four or five months, and took classes the remainder of the year. Mary Giles taught in Tarboro, North Carolina.

By 1878, Theresa, Mary, and Persis had completed all of the requisite coursework at Trinity College. As such, they were allowed to stand for the comprehensive exams taken by all students wishing to graduate. They passed, and President Craven went on to submit their names—along with those of the male students who passed—to the board of trustees for consideration. On June 12, 1878, the Board of Trustees "recommended for full and regular graduation to the degree of Bachelor of Arts." As a result of this extraordinary measure, Theresa, Mary, and Persis Giles are considered the first female graduates of Duke University, despite never having been officially admitted or enrolled at Trinity.

== Greenwood Female College ==
Together with their younger sister Sue, sisters Persis, Mary, and Theresa Giles founded the Greenwood Female College in Greenwood, South Carolina, in 1885, along with the Misses' Giles School for younger girls. Greenwood was chosen for two reasons: first, their brother, E.S.F., had set up a law practice in town, and second, the town was lacking any higher education facility at the time. Over the next several decades, Mary, Theresa, and Persis Giles, along with their staff, educated hundreds of young women in the area. For the first time, these young ladies received an education that was as good as, or better than, that offered to the area's young men.

== Travels and later life ==
The Giles sisters evidently considered travel an important part of their education, though they did not always enjoy it. They made several major trips abroad, including a trip made by Mary and Persis to Europe in 1889. They also eventually traveled to India with a Christian teacher's organization. While traveling, the sisters wrote columns for newspapers in the Carolinas, including the Abbeville Press and Banner and the local Greenwood paper.

== Legacy ==
A women's dormitory was built in their honor at the Woman's College at Duke University in 1927. It is now a dormitory housing 115 first-year students.
