= North Carolina Institute of Medicine =

The North Carolina Institute of Medicine (NC IOM) is a quasi-state agency charged with building consensus on critical matters of health policy facing North Carolina and advising on health matters.

== History ==
The North Carolina Institute of Medicine was chartered by the North Carolina General Assembly in 1983 by the creation of a general statute charging it with four purposes.

1. Be concerned with the health of the people of North Carolina;
2. Monitor and study health matters;
3. Respond authoritatively when found advisable;
4. Respond to requests from outside sources for analysis and advice when this will aid in forming a basis for health policy decisions.

It has no affiliation with the Institute of Medicine of the National Academy of Sciences. It is administratively housed in the Cecil G. Sheps Center for Health Services Research at the University of North Carolina.

== Leadership ==
=== Presidents ===
John Sessions was the first President and CEO, serving from 1984 to 1986.

Ewald W. Busse was president from 1986 until 1994.

In 1994, Gordon E. DeFriese assumed the position of President and CEO.

The current President and CEO is Pam Silberman.

=== Chairs of the Board ===
The founding Chair was James E. Davis who convinced North Carolina legislators that an organization based on the National IOM would greatly benefit North Carolina citizens. Dr. Davis was a notable physician at Duke University and went on to become the president of both the North Carolina Medical Society and the AMA.

E. Harvey Estes served as Chair until 2006.

The current Chair of the Board of Directors is William Atkinson, President and CEO of WakeMed Health and Hospitals.

== Publications ==
Since 2002, the NC IOM has been a co-publisher (with The Duke Endowment) of the North Carolina Medical Journal. The NC IOM also produces a wide range of materials, ranging from final reports of Task Forces to smaller snapshots of the current health of North Carolinians.

=== 2007 ===
- Stockpiling Solutions: Ethics and Pandemic Influenza Planning
- Providers in Demand: Primary Care and Specialty Supply Workforce
- Just What Did the Doctor Order: Health Literacy

=== 2006 ===
- NC IOM Task Force on Covering the Uninsured: Final Report
- Evidence-Based Approaches to Worksite Wellness and Employee Health Promotion and Disease Prevention
- 2006 North Carolina Child Health Report Card (co-produced with Action for Children North Carolina)

=== 2005 ===
- NC IOM Task Force on the NC Healthcare Safety Net: Final Report
- New Directions for North Carolina: A Report of the NC Institute of Medicine Task Force on Child Abuse Prevention
- 2005 North Carolina Child Health Report Card

=== 2004 ===
- NC IOM Task Force on the NC Healthcare Safety Net: Final Report
- NC IOM Task Force on the NC Nursing Workforce: Final Report
- 2004 North Carolina Child Health Report Card

== Trivia ==
The Kentucky Institute of Medicine is based on the design of the NC IOM.
