= Wilhelmina Reuben-Cooke =

American attorney (1946–2019)

- Born: Wilhelmina Reuben; December 13, 1946; South Carolina
- Died: October 22, 2019 (aged 72)
- Education: University of Michigan Law School
- Occupation: Attorney
- Known for: being one of the first five African-American undergraduates admitted to Duke University

Wilhelmina Reuben-Cooke was one of the first five African American undergraduates admitted to Duke University in 1963. She graduated with a Bachelor of Arts degree with distinction.

== Early life ==
Wilhelmina Reuben-Cooke was born as Wilhelmina Reuben in South Carolina. She is the oldest of six children. Her father, Odell Reuben, served as President of Morris College, where her mother was also a professor.

== Education ==
Reuben-Cooke was one of the first five African American students admitted to Duke University in the fall semester of 1963, along with Mary Mitchell Harris, Gene Kendall, Cassandra Smith Rush, and Nathaniel B. White Jr. As a senior in 1967, Reuben-Cooke was elected May Queen by receiving the most write-in votes of any student in the Duke University Woman's College. After graduating from Duke, she received her juris doctor from the University of Michigan School of Law in 1973.

== Career ==
Reuben-Cooke was an Associate Attorney at Wilmer, Cutler & Pickering working in communications, antitrust, tax, securities, criminal and general corporate law. She became a professor of law (1986), then associate dean (1992) at Syracuse University College of Law. She then became a professor of law at the University of the District of Columbia and held appointments as the provost and vice president of academic affairs of the University of the District of Columbia. Prior to teaching, she was the associate director of Georgetown University Law Center's Institute for Public Representation, where she engaged in and supervised litigation before the Federal Communications Commission and federal courts, including the US Supreme Court.

As a pioneer and trailblazer in spaces that did not traditionally welcome Black women, her career was not without challenges and controversy. For example, in 2003, her provost and vice president of academic affairs appointment was erroneously challenged due to her perceived lack of experience and education, which was later reported as an error by the Washington Times. Her appointment was defended by the President of the University of the District of Columbia at the time, William L. Pollard.

=== Honors and awards ===
Her honors and awards include:

- Election to Phi Beta Kappa
- Woodrow Wilson Scholar
- Duke's May Queen
- Duke University Distinguished Alumni Award
- Syracuse University Sojourner Truth Award
- C. Eric Lincoln Distinguished Alumni Award from Duke's Black Alumni Council
- Black Citizens for a Fair Media Annual Award for Public Interest Advocacy

== Personal life ==
Reuben-Cooke was married to Edmund Cooke.

== Death ==
Reuben-Cooke died on October 22, 2019, at age 72.

In September 2020, her legacy as a pioneer at Duke and as a leading lawyer, law professor, university administrator and trustee for both Duke University and The Duke Endowment was celebrated by the renaming the Sociology-Psychology Building on West Campus as the Wilhelmina Reuben-Cooke Building.
