= Joseph L. Armstrong =

Joseph L. Armstrong was a professor at Duke University (at the time, called "Trinity College") best known for reforming Duke's curriculum in the late nineteenth century, changing it to a German research university model with the help of John Franklin Crowell. Armstrong did his undergraduate work at Johns Hopkins University and graduate work at the University of Leipzig.
