= John Franklin Crowell =

- John Franklin Crowell, Courtesy of the Duke University Archives

President of Trinity College
- In office 1887–1894
- Preceded by: Marquis Lafayette Wood
- Succeeded by: John Carlisle Kilgo

Personal details
- Born: November 1, 1857 York, Pennsylvania, U.S.
- Died: August 6, 1931 (aged 73) East Orange, New Jersey, U.S.
- Education: Yale University; Columbia University; University of Berlin

John Franklin Crowell
Coaching career (HC unless noted)
- 1888–1889: Trinity (NC)

Head coaching record
- Overall: 3–2

John Franklin Crowell (November 1, 1857 – August 6, 1931) served as president of Trinity College, the predecessor of Duke University, from 1887 to 1894. Crowell studied economics at Yale University, Columbia University, and the University of Berlin. He began his career in educational leadership at Schuylkill Seminary (a predecessor to Albright College) in Fredericksburg, Pennsylvania, in 1883, shortly after earning his BA from Yale. Crowell married Laura Kistler Getz in 1887, but she unfortunately died a year later. Crowell married Caroline Haas Pascoe in 1891.

== At Trinity College ==
Crowell is primarily known for overseeing Trinity's movement to Durham, North Carolina and for reforming Trinity's curriculum, along with Joseph L. Armstrong, to be more in line with the German research university model. Toward that end Crowell persuaded the competing student literary societies to combine their libraries into a single college collection, where he personally catalogued the books and kept hours at a reference desk to encourage proper research methods. He also corrected the Latin in the college motto. Crowell increased the number of visiting lecturers at Trinity, and helped establish several academic student publications, one of which, the literary magazine The Archive is the second oldest such publication in the United States. Crowell also served as the head coach of the football program from 1888 to 1889, compiling a 3–2 record.

== Head coaching record ==
Year	Team	Overall	Conference	Standing	Bowl/playoffs
Trinity Blue and White (Independent) (1888–1889)
1888	Trinity	2–1			
1889	Trinity	1–1			
Trinity:		3–2			
Total:		3–2			

== After Trinity College ==
After resigning from Duke, Crowell became head of the Department of Economics and Sociology at Smith College in 1895-1897. Crowell also earned his doctorate from Columbia University in 1897.

He later served as a writer and associate editor for the Wall Street Journal from 1906 to 1915. During his time in New York, Crowell was often affiliated with the politician Seth Low.

Crowell received an honorary LL.D. degree from Trinity in 1917. Dr. Crowell spent his later years in East Orange, New Jersey, where he died at his home on Aug. 6, 1931.
