= Brantley York =

- Brantley York, 1855, Courtesy of the Duke University Archives

President of Duke University
- In office 1838–1842
- Succeeded by: Braxton Craven

Personal details
- Born: January 3, 1805 Randolph County, North Carolina
- Died: October 7, 1891 (aged 86) Rutherford County, North Carolina

Richard Brantley York (January 3, 1805 – October 7, 1891) was a Methodist minister and educator best known for founding and serving as president of the institution that would become Duke University, Union Institute Academy in Randolph County, North Carolina. Overall, York founded six schools.

== Early life and education ==
York was born in Randolph County, North Carolina, as the seventh of nine children to Eli and Susanah Harden York. While his father worked as a distiller and miner, his employment was unstable and the family often relied on income earned by Brantley and his siblings as hired hands. York had little formal education, only attending school for thirteen months over a ten-year period. His education was largely self-taught through the library at Ebenezer Church, where he was also introduced to the Methodist religion and converted in 1823.

== Educator ==
York began teaching at Bethlehem Church in Guilford County, North Carolina, in 1831 and received a license to preach there in 1833. He was ordained as a deacon in 1838, but was not made a member of the North Carolina conference of the Methodist Episcopal Church due to an administrative error. He was appointed to teach at Brown's Schoolhouse in Randolph County, which at the time was a rough single room log structure.

Upon his appointment, York suggested creating a more permanent building and built Union Institute Academy in 1839. The structure was a two room building, and was named "Union" because it was used by both Methodist and Quakers. Union would eventually become Duke University but at the time was a secondary school. York left Union in 1842, and considered his time there to be a burden. He appreciated the success that he had accomplished, but had to devote considerable time to raising money and worked late nights preparing to teach subjects with which he was unfamiliar.

After leaving Union, York went on to found Clemmonsville High School, Olin High School, York Collegiate Institute, Ruffin-Badger Institute, and New Salem and Randleman High School in North Carolina. He published multiple English grammars and a The Man of Business and Railroad Calculator, a text that taught arithmetic and basic legal principles.

== Later career ==
York became blind at the age of 48, symptoms of which had developed in one eye while he was working at Union. He accepted an appointment as a professor of belles lettres at Rutherford College in 1873 and taught there until 1877, and was awarded a D.D. there in 1881.

While he never became a member of the North Carolina Methodist conference, he did serve as the first president of the North Carolina Local Ministers Conference, and continued to preach, giving an estimated 8,000 lectures or sermons. He also served as a President of the Randolph County Temperance Society in 1853 and spoke publicly in support of North Carolina's prohibition campaign in 1881.
