= Henry N. Snyder =

4th President of Wofford College
- In office 1902–1942
- Preceded by: James Henry Carlisle
- Succeeded by: Walter Kirkland Greene

Personal details
- Born: January 14, 1865 Macon, Georgia, U.S.
- Died: September 18, 1949 (aged 84) Spartanburg, South Carolina, U.S.
- Education: Vanderbilt University

Henry Nelson Snyder (January 14, 1865 – September 18, 1949) was an American Methodist educator and author. He served as president of Wofford College from 1902 until his retirement in 1942.

== Early life ==
Henry Nelson Snyder was born on January 14, 1865, in Macon, Georgia. He attended Vanderbilt University, where he was a member of Chi Phi fraternity, graduating in 1887. He also studied at the University of Göttingen, Germany earned Snyder a Ph.D.

== Career ==
Snyder taught Latin at his alma mater, Vanderbilt University, from 1887 to 1890. He arrived in Spartanburg, South Carolina, in September 1890 to become professor of English literature. In 1902, he succeeded James H. Carlisle as president of Wofford College.

Snyder was a member of the Methodist Episcopal Church South Joint Commission, in which capacity he argued in favour of racial segregation. Snyder served on the Board of Trustees of Spartanburg Junior College from its inception in 1911 until his death and was chairman of that board several times. He served on the Methodist unification commission as well the joint hymnal commission. A Phi Beta Kappa, Snyder was a member of the Modern Language Association and the Religious Education Association

Snyder's autobiography, An Educational Odyssey, was published in 1947.

== Personal life ==
He married Lula Eubanks (1867–1956). Their only child Hugh McCrea Snyder pre-deceased his parents, dying in 1936.

== Death ==
He died at the Mary Black Hospital at the age of 84 on September 18, 1949, one day short of the fifty-ninth anniversary of his arrival in Spartanburg. After funeral services at the Wofford College Chapel (now known as the Leonard Auditorium, in the Old Main building), Dr. Snyder was buried in Oakwood Cemetery, Spartanburg, South Carolina.

== Selected bibliography ==
- 1906 -- The Denominational College in Southern Education. Nashville, TN: Board of Education, Methodist Episcopal Church, South. Reprint from the January 1906 issue of The South Atlantic Quarterly. OCLC 6157055
- 1906 -- Sidney Lanier — A Study of Interpretation. New York: Eaton and Mains and Cincinnati, OH: Jennings & Graham. Part of the Modern poets and Christian teaching series. OCLC 5841515
- 1911 -- Selections from the Old Testament. Edited with an introduction and notes by Dr. Snyder. Nashville, TN: Cokesbury Press, 1927. Part of the Standard English Classics series. OCLC 557574597
- 1926 -- The Persistence of Spiritual Ideals in English Letters. New York: Eaton and Mains and Cincinnati, OH: Jennings & Graham. Part of The Fondren Lectures of 1926 series. OCLC 5842234
- 1939 -- On Being Frontier-minded. Gainesville, FL: University of Florida. The David Levy Yulee lecture. OCLC 427886840
- 1947 -- An Educational Odyssey. New York and Nashville, TN: Abingdon-Cokesbury Press. OCLC 2760583 The publisher reprinted re-issued this work in 1957. OCLC 702564938 The original typescript manuscript An Educational Odyssey: the Autobiography of Henry Nelson Snyder by Henry Nelson Snyder, President Emeritus of Wofford College, Spartanburg, South Carolina containing corrections by the author and the press is in the Wofford College archives, Sandor Teszler Library. OCLC 698377619
