= John Carlisle Kilgo =

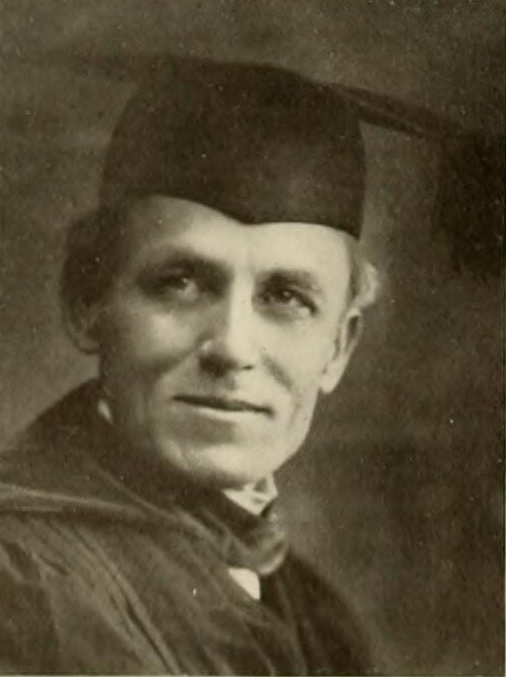
- Kilgo pictured in The Chanticleer 1912, Duke yearbook

President of Trinity College
- In office 1894–1910
- Preceded by: John Franklin Crowell
- Succeeded by: William Preston Few

Personal details
- Born: July 22, 1861 Laurens, South Carolina
- Died: August 11, 1922 (aged 61) Charlotte, North Carolina

John Carlisle Kilgo (July 22, 1861 – August 11, 1922) served as a bishop in the Methodist Episcopal Church, South (MECS) from 1910 to 1922. From 1894 to 1910, Kilgo was the president of Trinity College, in Durham, North Carolina, the predecessor of Duke University. Earlier, Kilgo was a circuit preacher in South Carolina and a financial agent of Wofford College.

John C. Kilgo, Courtesy of the Duke University Archives

== Early life ==
John Carlisle Kilgo was born to James Tillman Kilgo and Catherine Mason Kilgo on July 22, 1861, in Laurens, South Carolina. His father was a circuit preacher in the Methodist Episcopal Church, South. Kilgo attended Wofford College but dropped out after his sophomore year. Soon thereafter, the MECS ordained Kilgo as a circuit preacher in which capacity he served for six years. On December 20, 1882, Kilgo married Fannie Nott Turner. In 1888, Wofford College appointed Kilgo as a financial agent of the college where Kilgo became known in the region for his preaching and leadership potential. During his time at Wofford, Kilgo studied with Henry N. Snyder for three years and was awarded an honorary MA.

== Trinity College (Duke University) ==
John C. Kilgo was offered the presidency of Trinity College in 1894 at the age of thirty-three. Kilgo soon began acting on his desire to build the college into an institution with a national reputation. His presidency of Trinity College is notable for the 1903 Bassett Affair, wherein the university defended academic freedom. Kilgo's statement of Trinity College's aims were likely adopted in 1924 as the aims of Duke University.
"The aims of Duke University are to assert a faith in the eternal union of knowledge and religion set forth in the teachings and character of Jesus Christ, the Son of God; to advance learning in all lines of truth; to defend scholarship against all false notions and ideals; to develop a Christian love of freedom and truth; to promote a sincere spirit of tolerance; to discourage all partisan and sectarian strife; and to render the largest permanent service to the individual, the state, the nation, and the church. Unto these ends shall the affairs of this University always be administered."

Contemporaries characterized Kilgo as "a man afire" and students whispered among themselves that his pulse beat above normal. But they revered him and relished his bold attacks on narrow political and religious tenets of the time. However, one student did note as "the only flaw in his shining armor, a toleration for some Republican views," possibly a reference to his friendship with the Duke family. While well known for his stirring defense of academic freedom during the Bassett Affair, Kilgo also invited African-American leader Booker T. Washington to speak on the Trinity campus in 1896. Washington's appearance at Trinity was his first on a white Southern college campus. Additional principles firmly established during Kilgo's presidency include high standards in admissions, quality over numbers, the employment of the best possible faculty, and the equal education of women with men. As an indication of the national stature of the college, the President of the Carnegie Foundation for the Advancement of Teaching wrote Kilgo in 1909, "You are one of the few college presidents of this country who [is] attempting to graduate each year an individualized group of men [and women] rather than a group that is merely more educated than when it came to you."

There is now a quad on the West Campus of Duke University named after Kilgo.

== Bishop of the Methodist Episcopal Church, South ==
Kilgo had received votes to become bishop at the general conferences of the MECS in 1898, 1902, and 1906. Finally, Kilgo was elected as a bishop of the MECS in May 1910. As bishop, Kilgo oversaw the following annual conferences:

- 1910: KY, Louisville, North AL, FL
- 1911: KY, SC, North MS, MS
- 1912: Holston, Memphis, SC, Baltimore
- 1913: German Mission, AR, Little Rock, White River
- 1914: IL, KY, Western VA, Louisville, VA
- 1915: IL, NC, SC, AL
- 1916: Western VA, Western NC, VA, NC
- 1917: Japan Mission, China Mission, Korea Mission
- 1918: North MS, LA, MS
- 1920: No assignment because of poor health
- 1921: Partnered with Bishop McMurry in Northwest TX, LA, North MS, MS

John C. Kilgo died on August 10, 1922, at the age of sixty-one in Charlotte, North Carolina. Assisted by Bishop Collins Denny, Bishop Warren A. Candler officiated the funeral.

== See also ==
- List of bishops of the United Methodist Church

== Bibliography ==
- Garber, Paul N. John Carlisle Kilgo, President of Trinity College, 1894-1910 Duke University Publications. Durham, N.C.,: Duke University Press, 1937.
- Kilgo, John Carlisle, and D. W. Newsom. Chapel Talks. Nashville, Tenn., Dallas, Tex. [etc.]: Publishing house M. E. church, South, 1922.
- Porter, Earl W. Trinity and Duke, 1892-1924: Foundations of Duke University. Durham, N.C.,: Duke University Press, 1964.
- Rowe, Gilbert T. "John Carlisle Kilgo--Preacher and Educator." The Methodist Quarterly Review LXXI, no. 4 (1922).
- Walters, Kevin L. “Balancing Freedom and Unity: John Carlisle Kilgo and the Unification of Methodism in America.” Methodist History 48, no. 1 (October 2009): 43–57.
