= Marquis Lafayette Wood =

President of Trinity College (1883–1884)

- Marquis Wood, Courtesy of the Duke University Archives

President of Trinity College
- In office 1883–1884
- Preceded by: Braxton Craven
- Succeeded by: John Franklin Crowell

Personal details
- Born: October 23, 1829
- Died: November 25, 1893 (aged 64)

Marquis Lafayette Wood (October 23, 1829 – November 25, 1893) was a Methodist minister who served as president of Trinity College, the predecessor of Duke University, following the death of Braxton Craven. Wood raised the first endowment money for Duke. He is the only president of Duke who was also an alumnus, and submitted the 1889 resolution to move the school from Randolph County, North Carolina. Wood's one-sentence definition of the college presidency was that "All great enterprises require time and patience and labor and suffering and money." Following the end of his presidency in 1884, Duke was governed by a Committee of the Board of Trustees for three years, until John Franklin Crowell became president. Prior to his tenure at Duke, Wood served as a missionary in Shanghai.
