= William Trigg Gannaway =

American academic (1825–1910)

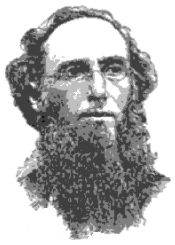

President of Duke University
- In office 1864–1865
- Preceded by: Braxton Craven
- Succeeded by: Braxton Craven

Personal details
- Born: June 10, 1825; Wythe County, Virginia, United States
- Died: June 5, 1910 (aged 84); Trinity, North Carolina, United States

William Trigg Gannaway (June 10, 1825 – June 5, 1910) was an American educator. He served as president pro tempore of Duke University (at the time named "Trinity College") during the absence of Braxton Craven in 1864–1865, and was a professor there for some 35 years, starting in 1857 and ending in 1892. He was a Professor of Latin, Greek, and philosophy at Trinity College.

Gannaway was born in Wythe County, Virginia. He received his diplomas from Emory and Henry College in 1847. He then opened a high school at Floyd Court House, Virginia. From 1854 to 1857, Gannaway operated a high school in Germantown, North Carolina.

He died at his farm in Trinity, North Carolina on June 5, 1910.
