= William Preston Few =

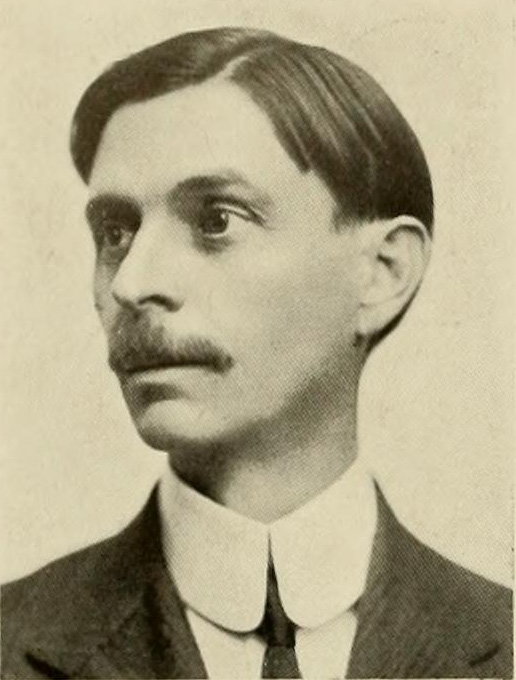
- Few pictured in The Chanticleer 1912, Duke yearbook

1st President of Duke University
- In office 1910–1940
- Preceded by: John Carlisle Kilgo
- Succeeded by: Robert Lee Flowers

Personal details
- Born: December 29, 1867 Greenville County, South Carolina
- Died: October 16, 1940 (aged 72) Durham, North Carolina

William Preston Few (December 29, 1867 – October 16, 1940) was the first president of Duke University and the fifth president of its predecessor, Trinity College.

== Early life ==
Few received his B.A. from Wofford College, Class of 1889, where he was a member of Chi Phi fraternity. He also received a Ph.D. from Harvard University.

== Career ==
Few joined the faculty of Trinity College in Durham, North Carolina in 1896 as a professor of English. He became dean in 1902 and president in 1910.

In 1924, Few presided over the transformation of Trinity College into Duke University, and was president of the renamed university until his death in 1940. During his 30 years as president, Few oversaw an expansion of the institution that is difficult to compare in modern terms. He worked with James B. Duke to make The Duke Endowment a reality and led the school's growth from a college of 363 students and 32 faculty in 1910 to a university consisting of nine schools, 3,716 students, and 476 faculty. Much of the growth occurred during the Great Depression, which brought hard financial times to most universities. He died of coronary thrombosis in 1940.

William Few was a member of The Order of the Red Friars, a Duke University secret society.

== Death ==
Few died on October 16, 1940.
