= Julian Deryl Hart =

President of Duke University from 1960 to '63

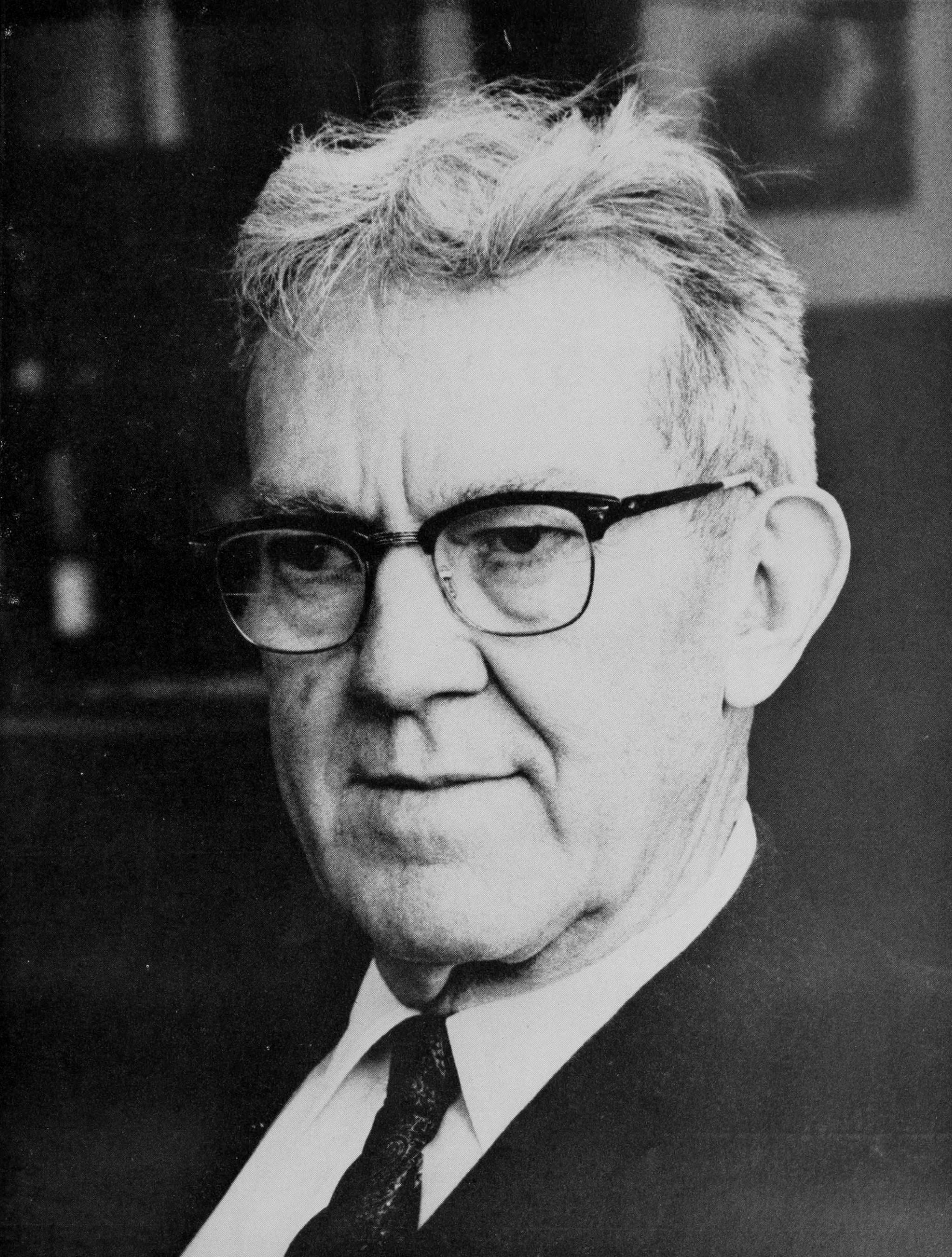
- Hart circa 1962

4th President of Duke University
- In office 1960–1963
- Preceded by: Arthur Hollis Edens
- Succeeded by: Douglas Knight

Personal details
- Born: August 27, 1894 Buena Vista, Georgia
- Died: July 1, 1980 (aged 85) Durham, North Carolina
- Spouse: Mary Hart

Julian Deryl Hart (August 27, 1894 – June 1, 1980) served as President of Duke University from 1960 to 1963. Previously, he was the Professor and Chairman of the Department of Surgery at Duke. During his presidency of three years, he planned and initiated programs to enhance the "academic excellence" of the university. For example, he redefined the Office of the Registrar, Undergraduate Admissions, and Development. Faculty salaries increased and the number of distinguished professorships doubled. He also was instrumental in amending the admissions policy to uphold equality regardless of race, creed, or national origin.

Hart's home, the J. Deryl Hart House in Durham, North Carolina, serves as the official residence of Duke's presidents.
