= Arthur Hollis Edens =

American academic (1901–1968)

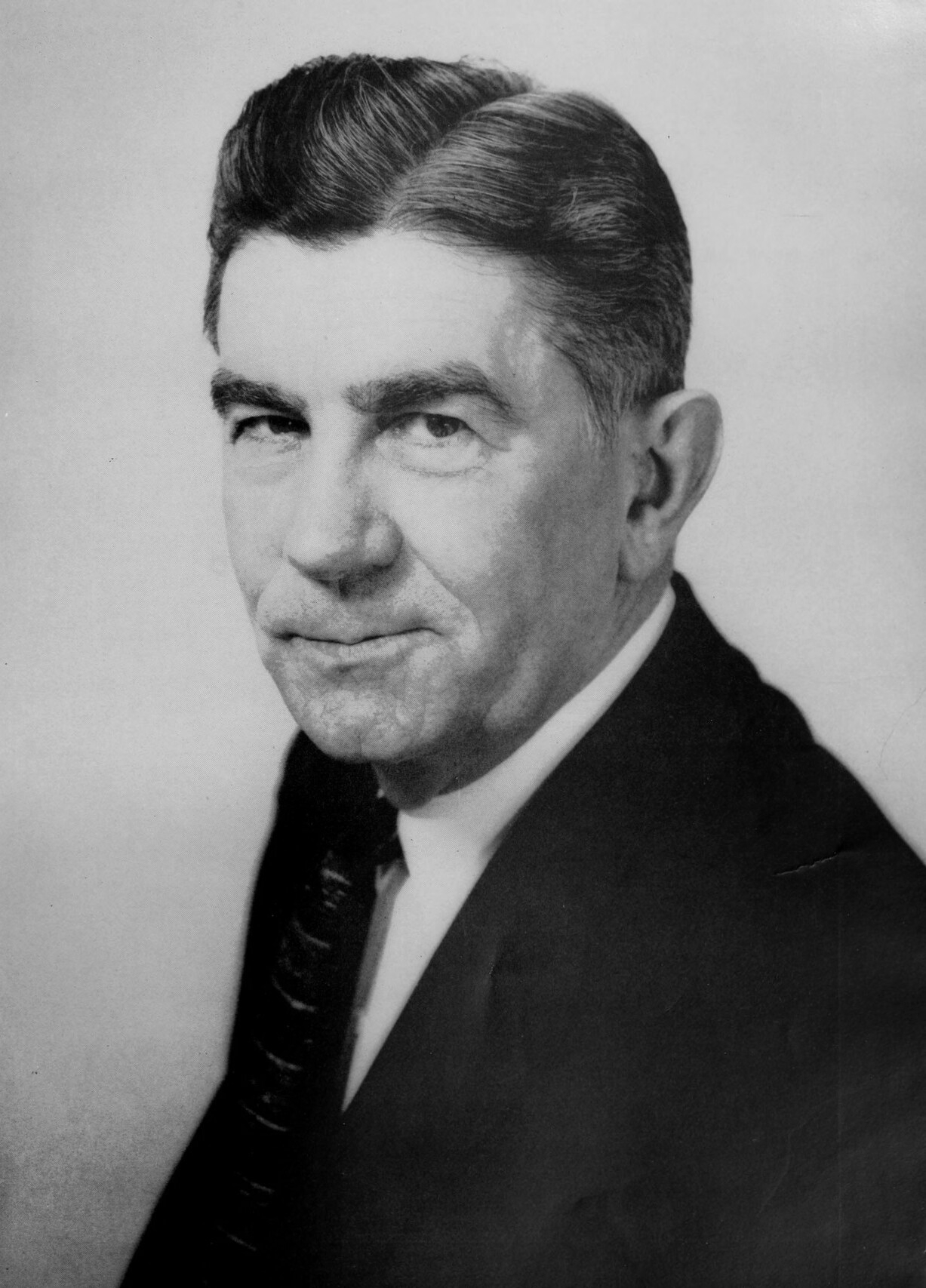
- Edens circa 1959

3rd President of Duke University
- In office 1949–1960
- Preceded by: Robert Lee Flowers
- Succeeded by: Julian Deryl Hart

Personal details
- Born: February 14, 1901 Willow Grove, Tennessee
- Died: August 7, 1968 (aged 67) Atlanta, Georgia
- Education: Emory University (B.Ph, MA); Harvard University (MPA, PhD)

Arthur Hollis Edens (February 14, 1901 – August 7, 1968) served as 3rd President of Duke University from 1949 to 1960. Duke's third president after the school's expansion from college to university, Edens was first president hired from outside the university since 1894, when John C. Kilgo was hired away from Wofford College. An executive with the Rockefeller Foundation and a native Southerner, Edens launched a capital gifts program and a national development campaign. The success of these efforts allowed Duke University to strengthen its endowment and experience a period of great growth during his presidency with the Duke University Union opening, academic units emerging, and the establishment of endowed professorships.
