= Braxton Craven =

American novelist

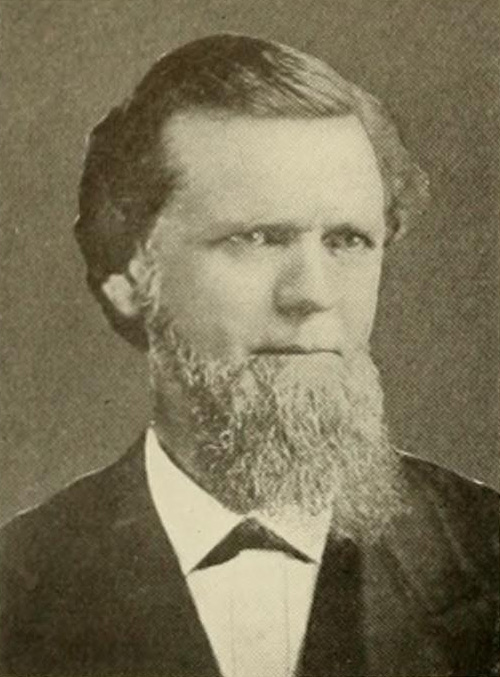
- Craven pictured in The Chanticleer 1912, Duke yearbook

President of Duke University
- In office 1842–1863
- Preceded by: Brantley York
- Succeeded by: Marquis Lafayette Wood
- In office 1866–1882

Personal details
- Born: August 22, 1822 Randolph County, North Carolina, United States
- Died: November 10, 1882 (aged 60) Durham, North Carolina, United States
- Spouse: Irene Leach Craven

Braxton Craven (August 22, 1822 – November 7, 1882) was an American educator. He served as the second president of the institution that became Duke University from 1842 to 1863 and then again from 1866 to 1882. The institution was known as Union Institute from 1841 to 1851, Normal College until 1859, and Trinity College until 1924. He taught ancient languages, ethics, philosophy, law, rhetoric, and logic at Duke.

== Life and career ==
Craven was born in Randolph County, N.C., in 1822, and was licensed to preach by the Methodist Church in 1840. He earned an A.B. (Hon.) in 1849 from Randolph-Macon College, and received various other degrees during his lifetime. His career included the following educational and administrative positions: Student-teacher, Union Institute (1841-1842); Principal of Union Institute (1842-1851); President of Normal College (1851-1859); President of Trinity College (1859-1863, 1866-1882).

Braxton Craven's connection with the school began at age 19 in 1841 when he was asked to enroll both as a student and assistant teacher at Union Institute. He succeeded Brantley York as principal in 1842 and lead the institution until his death in 1882. Well versed in educational theory, in 1851 he had the school chartered by the state as Normal College to train teachers for the state’s common schools. An ordained minister, he later turned to the Methodist Church for support resulting in the change of name to Trinity College in 1859. Under his leadership the school became well known, drawing its student body mostly from central Carolina, but also from all Southern states including some students from as far away as Arkansas and Missouri.

Braxton Craven, courtesy of Duke University Archives

The break in Craven's presidency from 1863 to 1865 was caused by divisions in the Methodist Conference over his management of the school that led to his resignation. Professor William Trigg Gannaway was appointed president pro tempore. After the Civil War, Craven was persuaded to resume his office. A highly respected educator, Craven concurrently served as President, and Professor of Ancient Languages, Mental and Moral Science, Metaphysics, Rhetoric and Logic, National and Constitutional Law, and Biblical Literature.

He married Irene Leach on September 26, 1844. Irene Leach was the first female graduate of Brown’s Schoolhouse (predecessor to Union Institute), and taught arithmetic at Union Institute before their marriage. In 1881, when Charlie Soong was studying at Trinity College, he spent much of his time in the Craven home, where he was tutored by Mrs. Craven.

Craven was a slave owner.

Braxton Craven died in 1882.

Braxton Craven Middle School, an all-sixth-grade school located on the site of what was once Trinity College and, later, Duke University, is named for him.

== Fictional writing ==
Braxton Craven also wrote fiction under the pen name of Charlie Vernon. One novel titled Mary Barker, published by Branson and Farrar in 1865, is described as “A thrilling narrative of early life in North Carolina.” It is listed in the catalog of the Library of Congress, call no. PS1449.C88 M3 1865, and a digital reproduction made from a microform copy is held by Indiana University

Another story, “Naomi Wise, or the Victim”, with an appended ballad purporting to be the original song composed about Naomi Wise’s murder, was first published in the January and February editions of the 1851 Evergreen newspaper. It was reprinted on April 29, 1874 in the Greensboro Patriot and several times thereafter in pamphlet form. In 1944 and again in 1962, the Rotary Club of Randleman, North Carolina published this same story along with the History of Randleman. It is a fabrication based on the death of Naomi Wise, but accepted as a true account for many years by most people who read it, including Braxton Craven’s biographer, Jerome Dowd.
