= The Duke Endowment =

Private foundation established in 1924 by industrialist and philanthropist James B. Duke

- Formation: 1924; 102 years ago
- Founder: James Buchanan Duke
- Type: Private foundation
- Headquarters: Charlotte, North Carolina, United States
- President: Rhett N. Mabry
- Revenue: $176,470,598 (2015)
- Expenses: $150,197,658 (2015)
- Website: dukeendowment.org

The Duke Endowment is a private foundation established in 1924 by industrialist and philanthropist James B. Duke. The foundation is based in Charlotte, North Carolina, and supports selected programs of higher education, health care, children's welfare, and spiritual life in North Carolina and South Carolina.

The foundation provided funding to build, expand and upgrade hospitals across the Carolinas in the early 20th century, focusing in particular on hospitals serving rural and Black residents. A 2024 study in the American Economic Review found that this funding significantly improved the medical sector, improved physician quality and fostered medical innovation, in addition to reducing infant mortality and long-run mortality.

== Background ==
James B. Duke endowed the foundation on December 11, 1924, with $40 million. In the Indenture of Trust, Duke specified that he wanted the endowment to support Duke University, Davidson College, Furman University, Johnson C. Smith University; non-profit hospitals and children's homes in the two Carolinas; and rural United Methodist churches in North Carolina, retired pastors, and their surviving families. When Duke died in 1925, he left the endowment an additional $67 million. Adjusted for present value, total gifts would amount to more than $1.96 billion today.

The market value of the endowment's assets has grown to $3.69 billion in 2017. From 1924 to 2018, the endowment awarded over $3.7 billion in grants.

The Duke Endowment is a co-publisher, along with the North Carolina Institute of Medicine, of the North Carolina Medical Journal, a journal of health policy analysis and debate.

The endowment was established by a trust indenture that specifies how the funds were to be used. First, $6 million was to be used to either found a Duke University or to enhance Trinity College in Durham, North Carolina, if that school changed its name to Duke University within three months. The remaining funds were to be invested (primarily in Duke Power Company stock). Of the income generated annually by these funds, 20% were to be reinvested, each trustee was to receive 0.2%, and the rest was to be paid out in the following allocation:

Purpose	Share
Duke University	32%
Hospitals in NC and SC	32%
Davidson College	5%
Furman University	5%
Johnson C. Smith University	4%
Non-profits in NC and SC	10%
Retired Methodist pastors and their surviving families	2%
Constructing Methodist churches in NC and SC	6%
Rural Methodist church maintenance in NC and SC	4%
