= Robert Lee Flowers =

American academic (1870–1951)

- Robert Lee Flowers, Courtesy of the Duke University Archives

2nd President of Duke University
- In office 1941–1948
- Preceded by: William Preston Few
- Succeeded by: Arthur Hollis Edens

Personal details
- Born: November 6, 1870 Alexander County, North Carolina
- Died: August 24, 1951 (aged 80) Durham, North Carolina

Robert Lee Flowers (November 6, 1870 – August 24, 1951) served as 2nd president of Duke University from 1941 to 1948. Flowers graduated from the U.S. Naval Academy and worked for Trinity College as a professor in electrical engineering and mathematics before becoming an administrator. He served the university for over sixty years – holding the positions of Treasurer, Vice-President, President, and Chancellor.

Flowers was first employed as instructor for Trinity while the college was still in Randolph County. As an engineer, one of his first responsibilities was to wire the new buildings in Durham for electricity after the move in 1892. Affectionately known by students and alumni as "Professor Bobby Flowers," he was named president of Duke University following the death of William Preston Few in 1941. His experience and stature were welcome because the demands of a world at war and the strains of transition to a peacetime economy dominated every aspect of university life during his presidency. In 1948, he stepped down as president and served as chancellor until 1951.
