= National Register of Historic Places listings in Durham County, North Carolina =

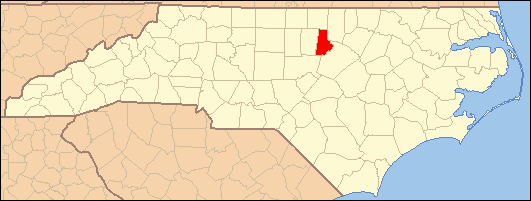

This list includes properties and districts listed on the National Register of Historic Places in Durham County, North Carolina. Click the "Map of all coordinates" link to the right to view an online map of all properties and districts with latitude and longitude coordinates in the table below.

== Current listings ==
This National Park Service list is complete through NPS recent listings posted May 1, 2026.

	Name on the Register	Image	Date listed	Location	City or town	Description
1	American Tobacco Company Manufacturing Plant	American Tobacco Company Manufacturing Plant	September 29, 2000 (#00001163)	Roughly bounded by W. Pettigrew St., Blackwell St., Willard St. and Carr St. 35°59′43″N 78°54′17″W	Durham	
2	Bassett House	Bassett House	November 29, 1979 (#79003330)	1017 W. Trinity Ave. 36°00′20″N 78°54′38″W	Durham	
3	Bennett Place State Historic Site	Bennett Place State Historic Site	February 26, 1970 (#70000452)	4409 Bennett Memorial Rd. 36°01′45″N 78°58′32″W	Durham	Site of the largest surrender of Confederate troops during the Civil War, April 26, 1865
4	Mary Duke Biddle Estate	Mary Duke Biddle Estate	January 9, 2013 (#12001157)	1044 and 1050 W. Forest Hills Boulevard; 35°58′59″N 78°55′08″W	Durham	
5	Richard D. Blacknall House	Richard D. Blacknall House	March 1, 1990 (#90000350)	300 Alexander Ave. 36°00′13″N 78°55′38″W	Durham	
6	Bright Leaf Historic District	Bright Leaf Historic District	December 30, 1999 (#99001619)	Roughly bounded by W. Peabody St., Duke St., Minerva Ave., N&W RR, Corporation St., Ligget St., Morris St. and W. Loop; 36°00′06″N 78°54′21″W	Durham	
7	Bull Durham Tobacco Factory	Bull Durham Tobacco Factory	September 10, 1974 (#74001346)	201 W. Pettigrew St. 35°59′38″N 78°54′16″W	Durham	Also known as W. T. Blackwell and Company Tobacco Factory
8	Bullington Warehouse	Bullington Warehouse	August 30, 1982 (#82003448)	500 N. Duke St. 36°00′10″N 78°54′22″W	Durham	
9	Burch Avenue Historic District	Burch Avenue Historic District	September 3, 2010 (#10000631)	Roughly bounded by S. Buchanan Blvd., W. Chapel Hill St., Duke University Rd., Burch Ave., and Rome Ave. 35°59′53″N 78°55′03″W	Durham	
10	John C. and Binford Carr House	John C. and Binford Carr House	August 5, 2011 (#11000508)	3400 Westover Rd. 35°56′48″N 78°57′22″W	Durham	
11	City Garage Yard and Fire Drill Tower	City Garage Yard and Fire Drill Tower	May 3, 2000 (#00000394)	501 Washington St. 36°00′10″N 78°54′14″W	Durham	
12	Clark and Sorrell Garage	Clark and Sorrell Garage	August 16, 2000 (#00000991)	323 Foster St. 35°59′57″N 78°54′33″W	Durham	
13	Cleveland Street District	Cleveland Street District	September 20, 1985 (#85002438)	Roughly Cleveland St. between Seminary & Gray Aves. & Mallard St. 35°59′59″N 78°53′42″W	Durham	
14	College Heights Historic District		January 28, 2019 (#100003295)	Roughly bounded by Masondale & Formosa Aves., Fayetteville, Cecil & Nelson Sts. 35°58′22″N 78°54′15″W	Durham	
15	Cranford-Wannamaker House	Cranford-Wannamaker House	November 29, 1979 (#79003331)	1019 W. Trinity Ave. 36°00′22″N 78°54′38″W	Durham	
16	Crowell House	Crowell House	November 29, 1979 (#79003332)	504 Watts St. 36°00′22″N 78°54′41″W	Durham	
17	Dillard-Gamble Houses	Dillard-Gamble Houses	January 19, 1979 (#79003333)	1311 and 1307 N. Mangum St. 36°00′32″N 78°53′38″W	Durham	
18	Downtown Durham Historic District	Downtown Durham Historic District	November 1, 1977 (#77000998)	Roughly bounded by Peabody, Morgan, Seminary, Cleveland, Parrish, and Queen Sts. 35°59′42″N 78°54′01″W	Durham	
19	Duke Homestead and Tobacco Factory	Duke Homestead and Tobacco Factory	November 13, 1966 (#66000590)	0.5 miles (0.80 km) north of Durham on Guess Rd., east of SR 1025; 36°02′06″N 78°55′16″W	Durham	
20	Duke Memorial United Methodist Church	Duke Memorial United Methodist Church	August 11, 1985 (#85001781)	504 W. Chapel Hill St. 35°59′51″N 78°54′34″W	Durham	
21	Durham Cotton Mills Village Historic District	Durham Cotton Mills Village Historic District	August 9, 1985 (#85001793)	Roughly bounded by Byrd and Middle Sts., E. Frontage Rd., and Reservoir St. 35°58′36″N 78°52′56″W	Durham	
22	Durham Hosiery Mill	Durham Hosiery Mill	November 14, 1978 (#78001944)	Angier Ave. 35°59′19″N 78°53′34″W	Durham	
23	Durham Hosiery Mills Dye House	Durham Hosiery Mills Dye House	January 22, 2014 (#13001115)	708-710 Gilbert St. 35°59′44″N 78°53′23″W	Durham	
24	Durham Hosiery Mills No. 2-Service Printing Company Building	Durham Hosiery Mills No. 2-Service Printing Company Building	November 27, 1985 (#85003055)	504 E. Pettigrew St. 35°59′23″N 78°53′52″W	Durham	Burned 1985/Deteriorated
25	East Durham Historic District		December 23, 2004 (#04001393)	Roughly bounded by Southern Railway right-of-way, N. Guthrie Ave. Holloway St., Hyde Park Ave, S. Plum St. and Vale St. 35°59′39″N 78°52′31″W	Durham	
26	Emmanuel AME Church	Emmanuel AME Church	August 9, 1985 (#85001775)	710 Kent St. 35°59′40″N 78°55′08″W	Durham	
27	Ephphatha Church	Ephphatha Church	August 9, 1985 (#85001778)	220 W. Geer St. 36°00′20″N 78°53′53″W	Durham	
28	Erwin Cotton Mills Company Mill No. 1 Headquarters Building	Erwin Cotton Mills Company Mill No. 1 Headquarters Building	November 20, 1984 (#84002724)	W. Main and 9th Sts. 36°00′27″N 78°55′24″W	Durham	
29	Fairntosh Plantation		April 3, 1973 (#73001337)	Near junction of SR 1004 and 1632; 36°05′56″N 78°49′42″W	Durham	
30	Wiley and Elizabeth Forbus House	Wiley and Elizabeth Forbus House	April 28, 2005 (#05000348)	3307 Devon Rd. 35°57′07″N 78°57′11″W	Durham	
31	Forest Hills Historic District	Forest Hills Historic District	December 28, 2005 (#05001476)	Roughly bounded by Kent St., Bivins St., Wells St., American Tobacco Trail, Forestwood Dr., and Beverly Dr. 35°58′55″N 78°54′53″W	Durham	
32	Foster and West Geer Streets Historic District	Foster and West Geer Streets Historic District	April 23, 2013 (#13000204)	Bounded by W. Corporation, Madison, and Washington Sts., Rigsbee Ave., the Norfolk Southern railroad tracks, and 724 and 733 Foster St. 36°00′14″N 78°54′05″W	Durham	
33	Geer Cemetery		August 5, 2024 (#100010672)	800 Colonial Street; 36°00′37″N 78°53′05″W	Durham	
34	Golden Belt Historic District	Golden Belt Historic District	August 9, 1985 (#85001791)	Roughly bounded by the Norfolk Southern railroad tracks, Taylor and Holman Sts., Morning Glory Ave., and Main St.; also 1000-1004 E. Main St. 35°59′26″N 78°53′20″W	Durham	Second set of addresses represents a boundary increase of July 30, 1996
35	Greystone	Greystone	June 1, 1982 (#82003449)	618 Morehead Ave. 35°59′32″N 78°54′32″W	Durham	
36	Hampton-Ellis Farm		December 22, 2011 (#11000955)	3305 Pat Tilley Rd. 36°10′11″N 78°50′01″W	Bahama	
37	Hardscrabble		January 20, 1972 (#72000960)	Northern side of SR 1002, 1.2 miles (1.9 km) west of its junction with SR 1003; 36°08′01″N 78°57′36″W	Bahama	
38	John Sprunt Hill House	John Sprunt Hill House	January 30, 1978 (#78001945)	900 S. Duke St. 35°59′18″N 78°54′36″W	Durham	
39	Hillside Park High School	Hillside Park High School	December 30, 2013 (#13001026)	200 E. Ulmstead St. 35°58′56″N 78°54′09″W	Durham	
40	Holloway Street District	Holloway Street District	September 20, 1985 (#85002437)	Roughly bounded by Holloway, Railroad, and Liberty Sts., Peachtree Pl., and Dillard St.; also roughly bounded by Holloway, Elizabeth, Primitive, and Queen Sts., and Mallard Ave. 35°59′43″N 78°53′30″W	Durham	Second set of boundaries represents a boundary increase of April 30, 2009
41	Kinchen Holloway House		August 29, 2008 (#08000814)	4418 Guess Rd. 36°04′26″N 78°55′59″W	Durham	
42	Hope Valley Historic District		December 11, 2009 (#09001105)	Avon Rd., Chelsea Circle, Cornwall Rd., Devon Rd. Exeter Way, Littlewoods Ln., Norwich Way, Stratford Rd. 35°56′56″N 78°56′52″W	Durham	
43	Horton Grove Complex	Horton Grove Complex	March 17, 1978 (#78001946)	North of Durham on SR 1626; 36°07′35″N 78°50′22″W	Durham	
44	Lakewood Park Historic District	Lakewood Park Historic District	May 1, 2003 (#03000340)	1601-1907 W. Lakewood Ave., 2001-2112 Chapel Hill Rd., 1406-1601 James St., and 1809-1819 Bivins St. 35°59′14″N 78°55′33″W	Durham	
45	Leigh Farm	Leigh Farm	September 5, 1975 (#75001257)	East of Chapel Hill off NC 54; 35°55′19″N 78°58′58″W	Chapel Hill	
46	Liberty Warehouse Nos. 1 and 2	Liberty Warehouse Nos. 1 and 2	August 6, 2008 (#08000774)	611-613 Rigsbee Ave. 36°00′05″N 78°54′00″W	Durham	
47	Little Creek Site (31 DH 351)		January 11, 1985 (#85000118)	Address Restricted	Chapel Hill	
48	Little River High School	Little River High School	April 17, 2017 (#100000896)	8307 N. Roxboro Rd. 36°08′43″N 78°54′24″W	Bahama	
49	Bartlett Mangum House	Bartlett Mangum House	May 25, 1989 (#89000446)	2701 Chapel Hill Rd. 35°58′37″N 78°56′09″W	Durham	
50	Meadowmont	Meadowmont	July 11, 1985 (#85001554)	Off NC 54; 35°54′40″N 79°00′19″W	Chapel Hill	
51	Morehead Hill Historic District	Morehead Hill Historic District	August 9, 1985 (#85001792)	Roughly bounded by Jackson St., the East-West Expressway, S. Duke St., Lakewood Ave., Shephard St., and Arnette Ave.; also portions of Arnette, Vickers, Yancey, Parker, and Wells Sts. 35°59′23″N 78°54′46″W	Durham	Second set of boundaries represents a boundary increase of June 2, 2004
52	Pauli Murray Family Home	Pauli Murray Family Home	December 23, 2016 (#100000866)	906 Carroll St. 35°59′34″N 78°54′59″W	Durham	Now the Pauli Murray Center.
53	North Carolina Central University	North Carolina Central University	March 28, 1986 (#86000676)	Bounded by Lawson St., Alston Ave., Nelson, and Fayette Sts. 35°58′23″N 78°53′47″W	Durham	
54	North Carolina Mutual Life Insurance Company Building	North Carolina Mutual Life Insurance Company Building	May 15, 1975 (#75001258)	114-116 W. Parrish St. 35°59′43″N 78°54′02″W	Durham	
55	North Durham County Prison Camp (Former)	North Durham County Prison Camp (Former)	December 31, 1998 (#98001573)	2410 Broad St. 36°01′57″N 78°54′39″W	Durham	
56	North Durham-Duke Park District	North Durham-Duke Park District	June 20, 1985 (#85001338)	Roughly bounded by Glendale Ave., W. Knox St., Roxboro Rd., Trinity Ave., Magnum & Broadway Sts. 36°00′22″N 78°53′38″W	Durham	
57	William Thomas O'Brien House	William Thomas O'Brien House	August 9, 1985 (#85001777)	820 Wilkerson Ave. 36°00′06″N 78°54′55″W	Durham	
58	Pearl Mill Village Historic District	Pearl Mill Village Historic District	August 9, 1985 (#85001782)	900 block of Washington and Orient Sts. between Trinity and Dacien Aves. 36°00′19″N 78°54′08″W	Durham	
59	Pegram House	Pegram House	November 29, 1979 (#79003334)	1019 Minerva Ave. 36°00′15″N 78°54′37″W	Durham	
60	George Poland House		December 4, 2004 (#04001287)	502 John Jones Rd. 36°08′43″N 78°53′41″W	Bahama	
61	Powe House	Powe House	August 9, 1985 (#85001780)	1503 W. Pettigrew St. 36°00′18″N 78°55′11″W	Durham	
62	Russell School	Russell School	August 5, 2009 (#09000601)	2001 St. Mary's Rd. (south side SR 1002 .1 miles (0.16 km) west of junction with SR 1003); 36°07′24″N 78°56′45″W	Durham	
63	St. Joseph's African Methodist Episcopal Church	St. Joseph's African Methodist Episcopal Church	August 11, 1976 (#76001319)	Fayetteville St. and Durham Expwy. 35°59′11″N 78°53′53″W	Durham	
64	Scarborough House	Scarborough House	August 9, 1985 (#85001779)	1406 Fayetteville St. 35°58′49″N 78°54′00″W	Durham	
65	Scott and Roberts Dry Cleaning Plant, Office, and Store	Scott and Roberts Dry Cleaning Plant, Office, and Store	June 20, 2012 (#12000345)	733 Foster St. 36°00′18″N 78°54′06″W	Durham	
66	Smith Warehouse	Smith Warehouse	September 16, 1985 (#85002429)	100 N. Buchanan Blvd. 36°00′05″N 78°54′57″W	Durham	
67	Stagville	Stagville	May 25, 1973 (#73001338)	5828 Old Oxford Highway; 36°06′03″N 78°50′19″W	Durham	
68	Stokesdale Historic District		December 28, 2010 (#10001093)	Roughly bounded by Fayetteville St., Umstead St., Lawson St., Moline St., Concord St., and Dunstan St. 35°58′46″N 78°53′56″W	Durham	
69	Marcus Tilley House		January 14, 2000 (#99001684)	7616 Jock Rd. 36°09′20″N 78°50′26″W	Bahama	
70	Trinity Historic District	Trinity Historic District	March 26, 1986 (#86000672)	Roughly bounded by Green, Duke, Morgan, and W. Main Sts., Markham Ave., and Clarendon St.; also roughly bounded by the original Trinity Historic District, N. Buchanan Boulevard, W. Club Boulevard, Woodland Dr., and N. Duke St.; also 209-215 N. Gregson St. 36°00′22″N 78°54′43″W	Durham	Second and third sets of boundaries represent boundary increases of June 4, 2004 and January 9, 2008 respectively
71	Harriet Tubman YWCA		December 6, 2024 (#100011155)	312 East Umstead Street; 35°58′58″N 78°54′02″W	Durham	
72	Adolphus W. Umstead House		September 14, 1989 (#89001418)	NC 1607, 0.5 miles (0.80 km) north of NC 1611; 36°11′07″N 78°51′16″W	Bahama	
73	D.C. Umstead Store and House		December 2, 2014 (#14000983)	3500 Hall Rd. 36°11′04″N 78°50′41″W	Bahama	
74	Venable Tobacco Company Prizery and Receiving Room	Venable Tobacco Company Prizery and Receiving Room	August 21, 2003 (#03000804)	302-304 East Pettigrew; 35°59′29″N 78°53′57″W	Durham	
75	Venable Tobacco Company Warehouse	Venable Tobacco Company Warehouse	August 9, 1985 (#85001847)	302-304 E. Pettigrew St. 35°59′32″N 78°53′57″W	Durham	
76	Watts and Yuille Warehouses	Watts and Yuille Warehouses	April 5, 1984 (#84002259)	905 W. Main St. 36°00′01″N 78°54′37″W	Durham	
77	Watts Hospital	Watts Hospital	April 2, 1980 (#80002824)	Broad St. and Club Blvd. 36°01′09″N 78°55′15″W	Durham	
78	Watts-Hillandale Historic District	Watts-Hillandale Historic District	April 25, 2001 (#01000427)	Roughly bounded by Durham Waterworks, Wilson St., Sprunt Ave., Broad St., Englewood Ave., and Hillsborough Rd. 36°01′14″N 78°55′45″W	Durham	
79	West Durham Historic District	West Durham Historic District	March 26, 1986 (#86000680)	Roughly bounded by Knox, Ninth, W. Main Sts., and Rutherford St. and Carolina Ave. 36°00′41″N 78°55′28″W	Durham	
80	West End Cemeteries Historic District		August 6, 2024 (#100010669)	1000-1800 Morehead Avenue; 35°59′31″N 78°55′11″W	Durham	
81	West Point on the Eno	West Point on the Eno	August 9, 1985 (#85001776)	5101 N Roxboro St. 36°04′11″N 78°54′31″W	Durham	
82	Wright's Automatic Machinery Company	Wright's Automatic Machinery Company	December 26, 2012 (#12001088)	915 Holloway St. 35°59′42″N 78°53′04″W	Durham	

== See also ==
- National Register of Historic Places listings in North Carolina
- List of National Historic Landmarks in North Carolina
