= Timeline of Durham, North Carolina =

The following is a timeline of the history of the city of Durham, North Carolina, USA.

== 19th century ==
- 1865 - April 26: Confederate "Johnston surrenders to Sherman at Bennett House, near Durham."
- 1867 - Durham incorporated.
- 1869 - Union Bethel African Methodist Episcopal Zion Church founded in Hayti.
- 1880 - Population: 2,041.
- 1881
  - Town becomes seat of newly established Durham County.
  - W. Duke Sons & Company tobacco manufacturer in business.
- 1887
  - Durham Hebrew Congregation established (approximate date).
  - Main Street Methodist Church built.
- 1888 - Emmanuel AME Church built.
- 1889
  - Durham Daily Sun newspaper in publication.
  - First Christian and Missionary Alliance Church founded.
- 1890 - Population: 5,485.
- 1891 - St. Joseph's African Methodist Episcopal Church built.
- 1892 - Trinity College relocates to Durham.
- 1894 - Morning Herald newspaper in publication.
- 1898 - North Carolina Mutual Life Insurance Company in business.

== 20th century ==
- 1901
  - "Durham City limits quadruple in size."
  - Lincoln Hospital established.
- 1906
  - Durham Chamber of Commerce established.
  - Immaculate Conception Catholic Church built.
- 1908 - St. Joseph's Episcopal Church built.
- 1909
  - Arcade Theatre built.
  - Ebenezer Baptist Church established.
- 1910 - Population: 18,241.
- 1913 - Durham Colored Library founded.
- 1919 - Carolina Times newspaper begins publication.
- 1923
  - Blacknall Memorial Presbyterian Church built
  - National Religious Training School and Chautauqua opens.
- 1924
  - Trinity College renamed "Duke University".
  - Trinity United Methodist Church built
- 1925
  - North Carolina College for Negroes active.
  - Daisy Scarborough Nursery School founded.
  - Asbury Temple Methodist Church built
  - Watts Street Baptist Church built
  - Trinity Avenue Presbyterian Church built
- 1926
  - Duke University's Divinity School established.
  - Asbury United Methodist Church built
- 1927
  - First Baptist Church built
- 1930
  - Ephphatha Church built.
  - Duke University's School of Medicine opens.
  - Population: 52,037.
- 1933
  - Desegregation lawsuit Hocutt v. Wilson filed.
  - Calvert Method School founded.
- 1934 - WDNC radio begins broadcasting.
- 1936 - Three Arts founded.
- 1939
  - North Carolina College for Negroes law school established.
  - Center Theatre opens.
- 1944 - Durham Labor Journal begins publication.
- 1945 - Durham Drive-In cinema opens.
- 1950 - Population: 73,368.
- 1954 - WTVD (television) begins broadcasting.
- 1955 - Raleigh-Durham Airport terminal opens.
- 1957 - June 23: Royal Ice Cream Sit-in protest for civil rights.
- 1958 - Durham Redevelopment Commission and Research Triangle Institute founded.
- 1959 - Research Triangle Park established.
- 1960 - Population: 84,642.
- 1961 - Durham Industrial Education Center opens.
- 1962 - Carolina Friends School and Bennett Place state historic site
- 1964 - Anti-poverty Operation Breakthrough (program) established.
- 1966 - United Organizations for Community Improvement formed.
- 1968 - City Human Relations Commission and Women-in-Action for the Prevention of Violence and Its Causes established.
- 1969
  - March 11: Student demonstration.
  - North Carolina Central University active.
  - Duke University's School of Business and Museum of Art established.
- 1970
  - Institute for Southern Studies headquartered in Durham.
  - Population: 100,768 city; 446,074 metro.
- 1972 - Durham Voters Alliance founded.
- 1974 - Duke Homestead and Tobacco Factory state historic site established.
- 1975 - Ar-Razzaq Islamic Center founded.
- 1980 - Population: 100,831 city; 560,774 metro.
- 1981 - Little River attacks
- 1985 - Atlantic Coast Sikh Association headquartered in Durham.
- 1990 - Population: 154,580 city; 735,480 metro.
- 1991
  - Herald-Sun newspaper in publication.
  - Carmike Cinema 7 in business.
- 1993 - Sylvia Kerckhoff becomes mayor.
- 1995 - Old West Durham Neighborhood Association established.
- 1997
  - City website online (approximate date).
  - Nick Tennyson becomes mayor.
- 1998
  - Triangle Tribune newspaper begins publication.
  - WRAZ (TV) begins broadcasting from Durham.
- 2000 - Population: 187,035 city; 1,187,941 metro.

== 21st century ==
- 2001 - Bill Bell becomes mayor.
- 2002 - Buddhist Mindfulness Practice Center founded.
- 2004 - G. K. Butterfield becomes U.S. representative for North Carolina's 1st congressional district.
- 2005 - Duke University's Nasher Museum of Art building opens.
- 2006 - Duke lacrosse scandal occurs.
- 2007 - Southern Coalition for Social Justice formed.
- 2010 - Population: 228,330 city; 1,749,525 metro.
- 2019 - Durham gas explosion

== See also ==
- Durham history
- Durham County history
- National Register of Historic Places listings in Durham County, North Carolina
- Duke University timeline
- Timelines of other cities in North Carolina: Asheville, Charlotte, Fayetteville, Greensboro, Raleigh, Wilmington, Winston-Salem

== Bibliography ==
Published in the 20th century

- W. E. B. Du Bois (1912). "Upbuilding of Black Durham: The Success of the Negroes and their Value to a Tolerant and Helpful Southern City". The World's Work. 23. hdl:2027/hvd.32044092798693.
- Story of Durham: City of the New South, William Boyd (1925)
- Durham, NC: A Center of Education and Industry (1926)
- Federal Writers’ Project (1939). "Durham". North Carolina: A Guide to the Old North State. American Guide Series. p. 169+ – via Open Library.. + Chronology
- Robert Franklin Durden (1975). The Dukes of Durham, 1865-1929. Duke University Press. ISBN 0-8223-0330-2.
- Durham: A Pictorial History, by Joel Kostyu (1978)
- Ory Mazar Nergal, ed. (1980), "Durham, NC", Encyclopedia of American Cities, New York: E.P. Dutton, OL 4120668M
- Durham Architectural and Historic Inventory. Published by the City of Durham (1982)
- Christina Greene (1996). "'In the Best Interest of the Total Community'?: Women-in-Action and the Problems of Building Interracial, Cross-Class Alliances in Durham, North Carolina, 1968-1975". Frontiers: A Journal of Women Studies. 16 (2/3): 190–217. doi:10.2307/3346808. JSTOR 3346808.

Published in the 21st century

- Bull Durham: Business Bonanza, BWC Roberts and Snow E. Roberts (2002)
- Our Separate Ways: Women and The Black Freedom Movement in Durham, North Carolina, Christina Greene (2005)
- Leslie Brown (2009). Upbuilding Black Durham: Gender, Class, and Black Community Development in the Jim Crow South. University of North Carolina Press. ISBN 978-0-8078-7753-1.
- Jean Bradley Anderson (2011). Durham County: A History of Durham County, North Carolina (2nd ed.). Duke University Press. ISBN 978-0-8223-4983-9.
