= Foster and West Geer Streets Historic District =

Historic district in North Carolina, United States

- U.S. National Register of Historic Places
- U.S. Historic district
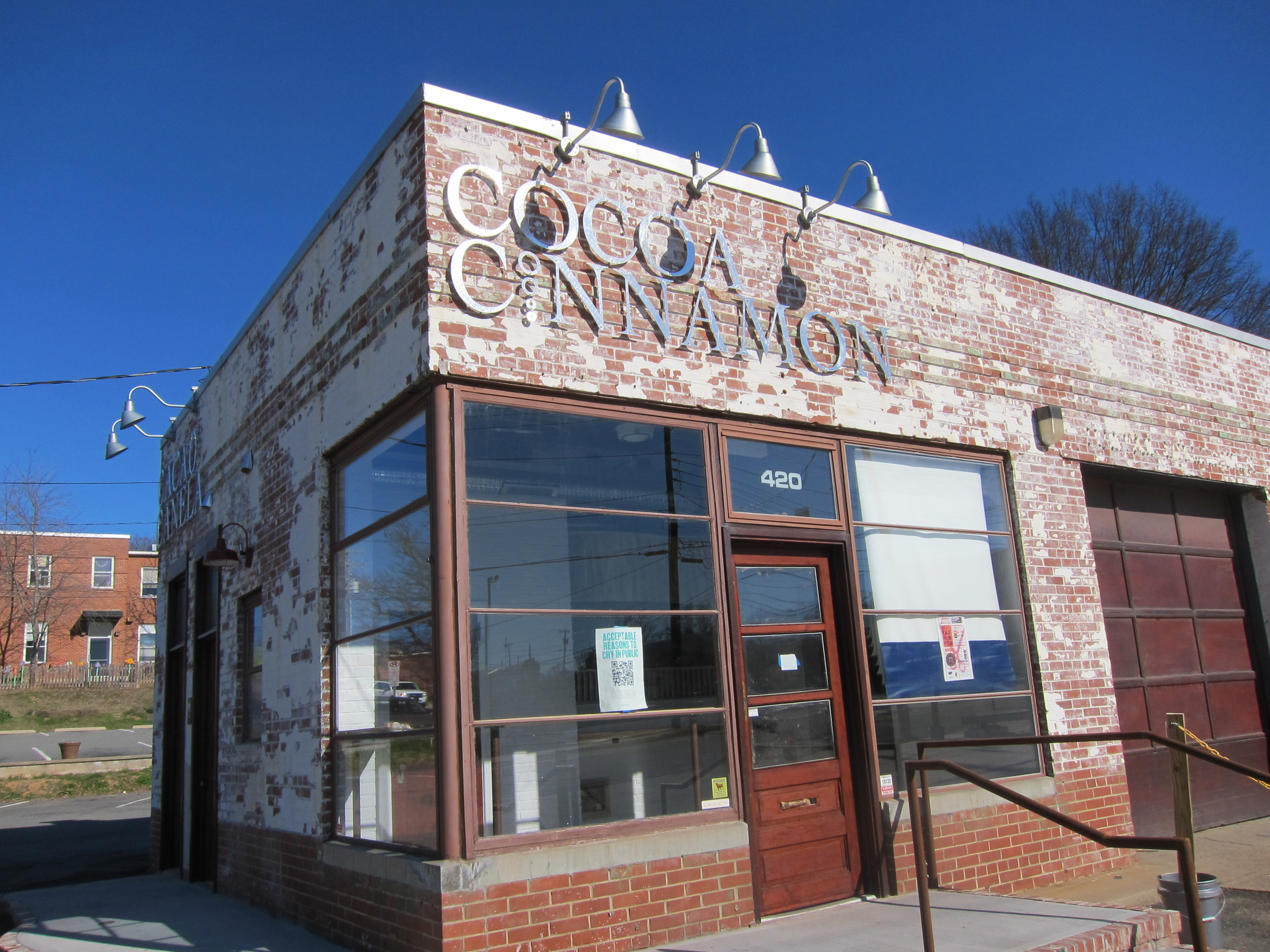

- Location within North Carolina Location within the United States
- Location: Bounded by W. Corporation, Madison & Washington Sts., Rigsbee Ave., N&SRR tracks, 724 & 733 Foster St., Durham, North Carolina
- Coordinates: 36°00′14″N 78°54′05″W
- Area: 28 acres (11 ha)
- Built: c. 1927-1963
- Architect: Atwood and Nash; Carr Sr., George Watts; Davis, Archie Royal
- Architectural style: Moderne, Colonial Revival, Mission Revival
- MPS: Durham MRA
- NRHP reference No.: 13000204
- Added to NRHP: April 23, 2013

Foster and West Geer Streets Historic District, also known as the West End, is a national historic district located at Durham, Durham County, North Carolina. The district encompasses 32 contributing buildings, 1 contributing site, and 4 contributing structures in a commercial section of Durham. The buildings primarily date between about 1927 and 1963 and include notable examples of Moderne, Colonial Revival, and Mission Revival architecture. Located in the district are the separately listed City Garage Yard and Fire Drill Tower and Scott and Roberts Dry Cleaning Plant, Office, and Store. Other notable contributing resources include R. J. Reynolds Tobacco Company warehouse (1938), the Durham Baking Company (1938), Durham Bulls baseball team ballpark (1939), Fletcher's Service Station (c. 1946), U.S. Naval Reserve Training Center (1948, c. 1955), Uzzle Motor Company (1940, c. 1948, c. 1970), King's Sandwich Shop (1950), and Royal Crown and Seven-Up Bottling Company (1939).

It was listed on the National Register of Historic Places in 2013.
