= Kinchen =

Kinchen is a surname (and rarely given name). Notable individuals with this surname include:

- Brian Kinchen, American football player
- Gary Kinchen, American football player
- James Kinchen, American boxer
- Marc Kinchen, American DJ and producer
- Todd Kinchen, American football player

== See also ==
- Kinchen Holloway House
