= Lakewood Park Historic District =

Historic district in North Carolina, United States

- U.S. National Register of Historic Places
- U.S. Historic district
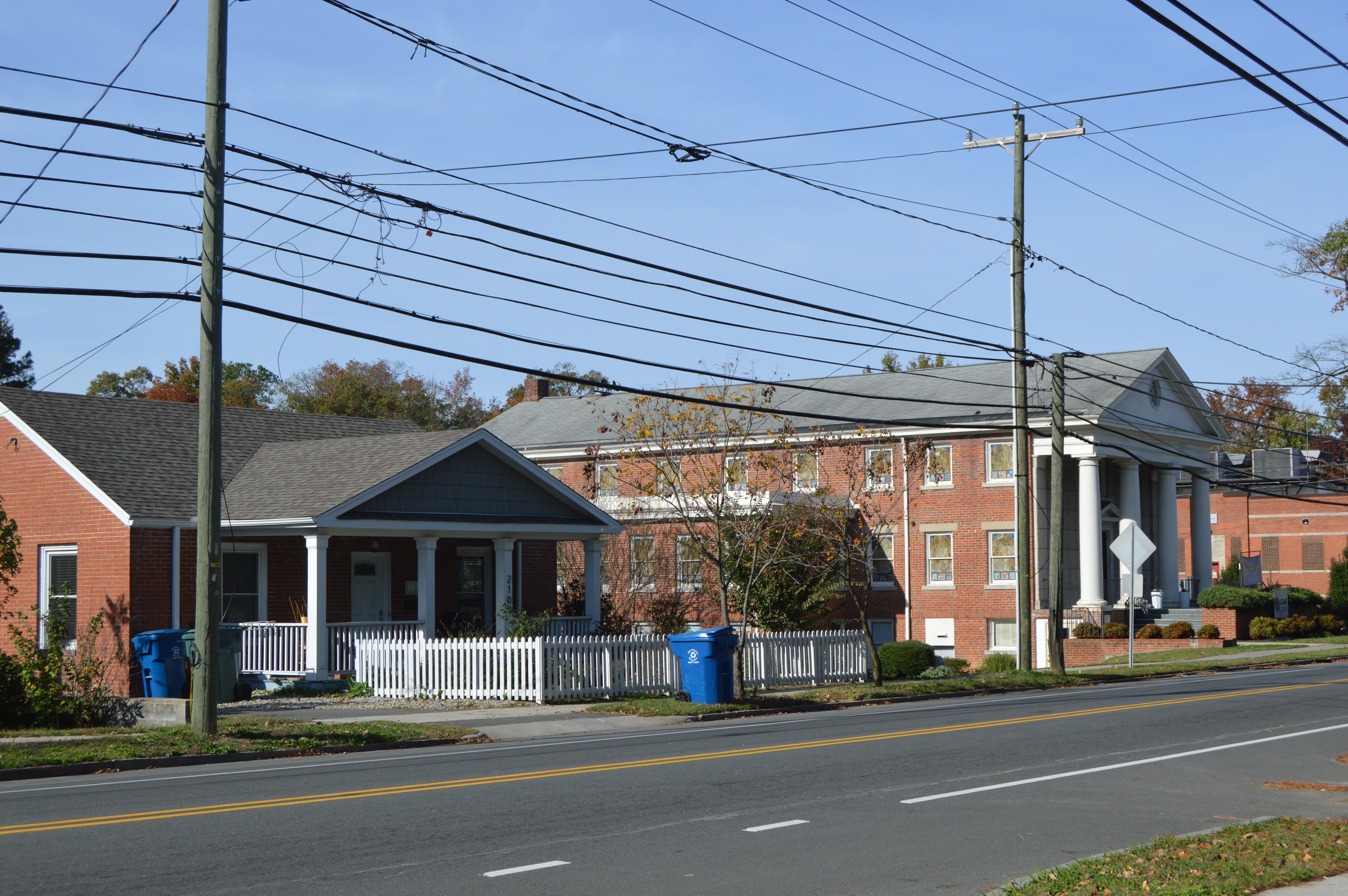
- Chapel Hill Road south of Bivins Street

- Location within North Carolina Location within the United States
- Location: 1601-1907 W. Lakewood Ave., 2001-2112 Chapel Hill Rd., 1406-1601 James St. and 1809-1819 Bivins St., Durham, North Carolina
- Coordinates: 36°01′14″N 78°55′45″W
- Area: 28.7 acres (11.6 ha)
- Built: 1902
- Architectural style: Bungalow/craftsman, Queen Anne, et al.
- NRHP reference No.: 03000340
- Added to NRHP: May 1, 2003

Lakewood Park Historic District is a national historic district located at Durham, Durham County, North Carolina. The district encompasses 76 contributing buildings in a predominantly residential section of Durham. They were built between 1902 and 1952 and include notable examples of Queen Anne and Bungalow / American Craftsman style architecture.

It was listed on the National Register of Historic Places in 2003.

== Notable buildings ==
- Bartlett Mangum House
