= Edgemont (Durham, North Carolina) =

Neighborhood in Durham, North Carolina

Edgemont Smoky Hollow
- Durham neighborhood
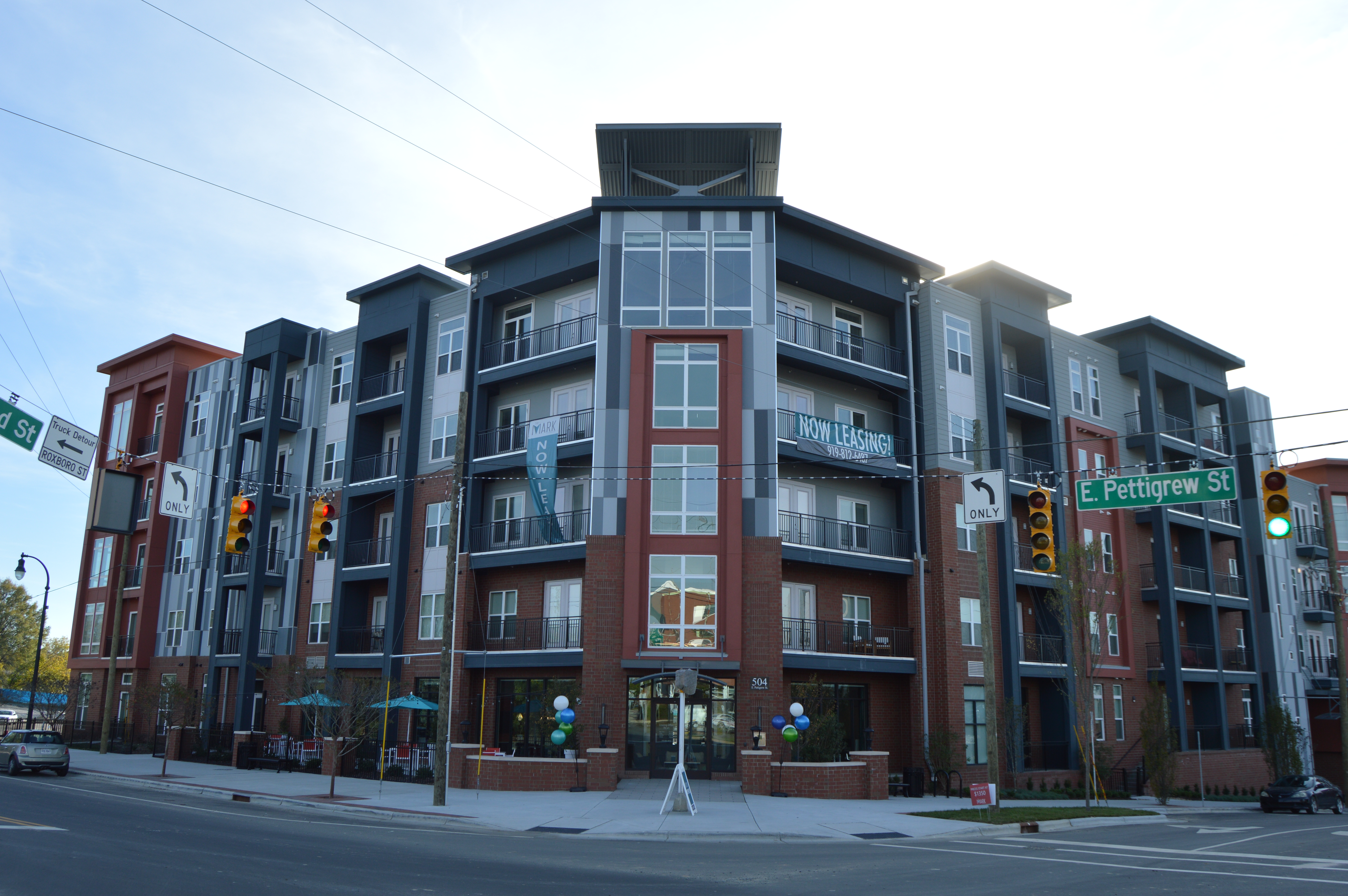
- Bullhouse Apartments in Edgemont
- Interactive map of Edgemont
- Coordinates: 35.988°N 78.893°W
- Country: United States
- State: North Carolina
- City: Durham
- Time zone: EST
- Postal code: 27701

The Edgemont neighborhood is a community of mill works located in Durham, North Carolina. Previously known as Smoky Hollow, this area developed around the Durham Hosiery Mills in the late 19th century. Durham was a “raw whistle-stop village” along the Great North Carolina Central Rail Road that transformed into one of the largest tobacco cities in the United States. The Durham City Bull became one of the better-known tobacco trademarks with the help of the big players in the industry, W. T. Blackwell and Company and Julian Carr. The success of these tobacco mills started overflowing into other industries, mainly textile mills that produced cloth bags, socks, and other hosieries. As demands rose, communities began growing and changing around the factories. A shift in the racial make up of the workforce was reflected in Edgemont's shift to a more African American dominant community as the years progressed. Julian Carr Jr. was one of the first to allow black workers in factory level jobs to help cope with the high demands. This industrialist's decision to reach over the race barrier is part of what made Durham “the City of the New South.” The Edgemont Neighborhood is just one of many examples of how Durham became one of the more progressive and tolerant locations for African Americans in the country.

== Origin of Durham manufacturing companies ==
The city of Durham materialized off a railroad because it was considered "healthy land," starting its journey towards the tobacco center of the South nearly 100 years later. In a nearby newspaper in 1855, John A. McMannen proposed to develop the area near the train stop by advertising land in the new location. In 1884 and 1887, Carr erected the Durham Cotton Manufacturing Company and Golden Belt Manufacturing Company. The cotton manufacturing company made "cloth for tobacco bags to chambrays, gingams … and colored goods." The Golden Belt factory, while less profitable than the cotton factory, expanded rapidly making primarily cloth bags for selling tobacco, Flour Sacks, and the like. As the cotton and silk business took off, the industry leaders decided to expand their manufacturing options and created hosiery mills, essentially – sock companies. In 1898, Carr merged his Golden Belt Hosiery Company with Durham Hosiery Company, owned by George W. Graham, to create the Durham Hosiery Mills, "a firm destined for success." The business grew rapidly and required another plant to keep up with demands. In 1901, machines were moved to an eastern section of Durham, and the neighborhood of Edgemont grew up around it. To fill the factories, surrounding communities were developed into suitable living spaces, as the newspapers phrased it, "Edgemont will be the beautiful industrial silkworm that will come from the Smoky Hollow cocoon." As Edgemont and other surrounding neighborhoods started to develop, the African American working community already started to move into the region and become a prominent part of the society. In 1926, the Durham Fruit and Produce Company was opened in the neighborhood on South Dillard Street.

== Neighborhood development ==
The Edgemont Neighborhood community developed out of a pocket in east Durham called Smoky Hollow, which was notorious for its rowdiness and crime in the late 19th century. The area had alternating black and whites neighborhoods because of the nature of the land, a source of the tension in the era, with blacks purchasing the cheap housing at the bottom of hills and whites at the top. A campaign rose to combat the rowdiness, newspapers threatened landlords in this area "to oust their unruly tenants" or their names would be published for all to read. When Edgemont became the home of a new mill in the beginning of the 20th century, more jobs and income was created for the area, helping to raise the standards of living.

The life of a mill worker, including the African American workers, proved to be far superior in the Durham community than anywhere else in the country. "The three largest mills had constructed [housing] for their employees, all in the same four-room, square, wooden pattern, with front porches." It was also noted that Durham industries did not recruit workers, including children, to work 12-hour days in the harsh conditions that normally existed. Instead, the employees would opt for more hours and families would utilize their entirety to increase the household's income. Durham mill owners were known for their respectable deeds amongst their employees. One such example was co-owner, Tom Fuller, was able to persuade the city to build a school building in the Edgemont Community, for the benefit primarily of the children in his Golden Belt mill community. When the First Presbyterian Church was established in Edgemont, he resigned his eldership in the church to devote more of himself to the new congregation composed entirely of his mill workers. It was also noted that many farmers who wanted to escape the "physical drudgery" of their jobs moved into Durham to be get regular 9 to 5 jobs with a definite wage and the community that encompassed it.

== The Black community in Durham ==
The African Americans maintained a much higher status in Durham than most other locations in the South. According to The North Carolina Guide of 1955, there were well established "college and [operational] business firms, a large insurance company, schools, newspapers, a library, a hospital and the Mechanics and Farmers Bank. In 1887, African Americans owned but two lots in the city. In 1953, their business assets aggregated $51,329,278.12." One of the first African American owned businesses in the area was a blacksmith shop. Entire sections of the city would go on to be African American run years before other cities in the south. Race tensions, while still prevalent in the city, were disregarded as the mill's success increased. Company owners slowly invested more into their African American dominated mill communities, because a well-established community was shown to be more efficient. After some funding by Julian S. Carr, John Merrick was able to become a full-time barbershop owner and then ensued to develop a career as an insurance investor. Other big names, such as Washington Duke, started helping out the African American communities by donating or funding certain areas of the population, such as printing presses for the black newspaper or helping to organize the first Negro Bank. One example that still stands today is the North Carolina Mutual Life Insurance Company, which grew into one of the largest African American insurance companies in the country. African American culture found itself decades ahead of the southern cities in early 20th century Durham due to business generated from the working black community and economic decisions by the owners.

== Edgemont and black labor ==
The African American dominated neighborhood of Edgemont developed around the new eastern location of a Durham Hosiery Mill factory. This industry of hosieries exploded because of the Spanish–American War demands, which required multiple factories to cope with the rapid growth. When the company expanded, Julian Carr Jr., the son of the founder, signed on and became treasurer of the company in 1900. Originally, the factory level jobs were occupied with white inhabitants of the neighborhood, but their numbers were too low to keep up with factory labor demands. Carr Jr. was one of the first to realize that the market demanded enormous amounts of the product, but the mill simply could not keep up the necessary amount of labor.

With this insight, he decided to lease a second factory, which soon became unique because it was the only textile mill in the country to be operated by African Americans. In 1903, with production capabilities declining, the younger Carr decided that he needed to reach across the race barrier and utilize the black population in the area. Carr wrote that blacks had only been used to "stem" the tobacco; stemming was the act of pulling the leaves off the stem. He planned to train a few workers to become factory machine operators, but was met with immediate opposition when proposed. The undisturbed race line was disrupted as certain claims were brought forth that the whir of the machines would put the "darkies" to sleep, or that the white workers were getting the bread taken out of their mouths. The businessman Carr still decided to follow through and cash in on the underutilized population. He hired an ex-slave of his family, John O'Daniel, as a recruiting agent. Carr wrote about his progress in teaching the African Americans how to use the machine. He described it was slow to start, as he had to learn to manage a new communal mind set towards family events, such as going to weddings, church gatherings, or even the circus. As time went on, a mill that had started with 50 working hands grew to over 400, which turned out close to 2,750 pairs of socks a day. The new hosiery mill started to turn a profit within 18 months, despite the predictions by the fellow manufacturing company owners. "The black hosiery mill workers did not gain all of the benefits offered to white workers at the other mills in town – educational facilities, for instance, and improved working conditions – but they won another contest of wills." Carr's progressive business decision to use of African American labor in his factories showed that the Durham Hosiery Mill was now able to keep up with production demands and with a high rate of profit return. He started this trend, which leaked into nearby companies, industries, and cities.

== Edgemont moving forward ==
With income steadily increasing in the area, the neighborhood of Edgemont slowly became an economic hub for the African American community. Shops and businesses to cope with the developing community began popping up all over the region. A self-sustaining community was emerging from the factory-housing district as schools, grocers, parks, community centers, clinics, and financial management establishments were built for the factory working population's comfort. The former shantytown had transitioned from a crime-ridden district to a progressive African American community that had aggregated a respectable income in a racially charged area of the country.

== Notable buildings ==
- Durham Hosiery Mill
- Durham Hosiery Mills No. 2–Service Printing Company Building
