= The Fruit (Durham, North Carolina) =

American concert and event venue

- The Fruit in 2026
- Interactive map of The Fruit
- Former names: Durham Fruit and Produce Company
- Address: 305 S Dillard Street
- Location: Durham, North Carolina, U.S.
- Coordinates: 35°59′26″N 78°53′48″W
- Owner: Tim Walter
- Type: Event venue LGBTQ nightclub

Construction
- Built: 1926
- Opened: 2017
- Renovated: 2014-2017

Website
- www.durhamfruit.com

The Fruit, formerly known as the Durham Fruit and Produce Company is a concert and event venue in Durham, North Carolina. It is located in the Edgemont neighborhood. The complex includes Club Era, an LGBTQ nightclub that opened in 2024.

== History ==
The Durham Fruit and Produce Company was established in 1926 at the corner of South Dillard Street and Ramseur Street in Durham's Edgemont neighborhood. The company was a wholesaler of fruit and other produce. In the late 20th century, the building housed a transmission shop and other industrial businesses.

The 22,000-square-foot warehouse was later renovated by Tim Walter as a gallery, performance, and workshop space, completed in 2017. Prior to the official opening of The Fruit, the venue hosted underground visual arts performances, dance performances, and theater performances. The first show at The Fruit was a dance and theater piece by Nicole Bullock titled Undone, focused on race relations in Durham. In 2021, The Fruit began hosted Super Secret Dance Party, which had previously been held at Arcana Bar and Lounge.

In 2024, drag queen Naomi Dix opened Club Era, an LGBTQ nightclub, in the building's basement.

== See also ==
- List of LGBTQ bars
