= St. Joseph's Episcopal Church (Durham, North Carolina) =

Coordinates: 36.0067°N 78.9213°W

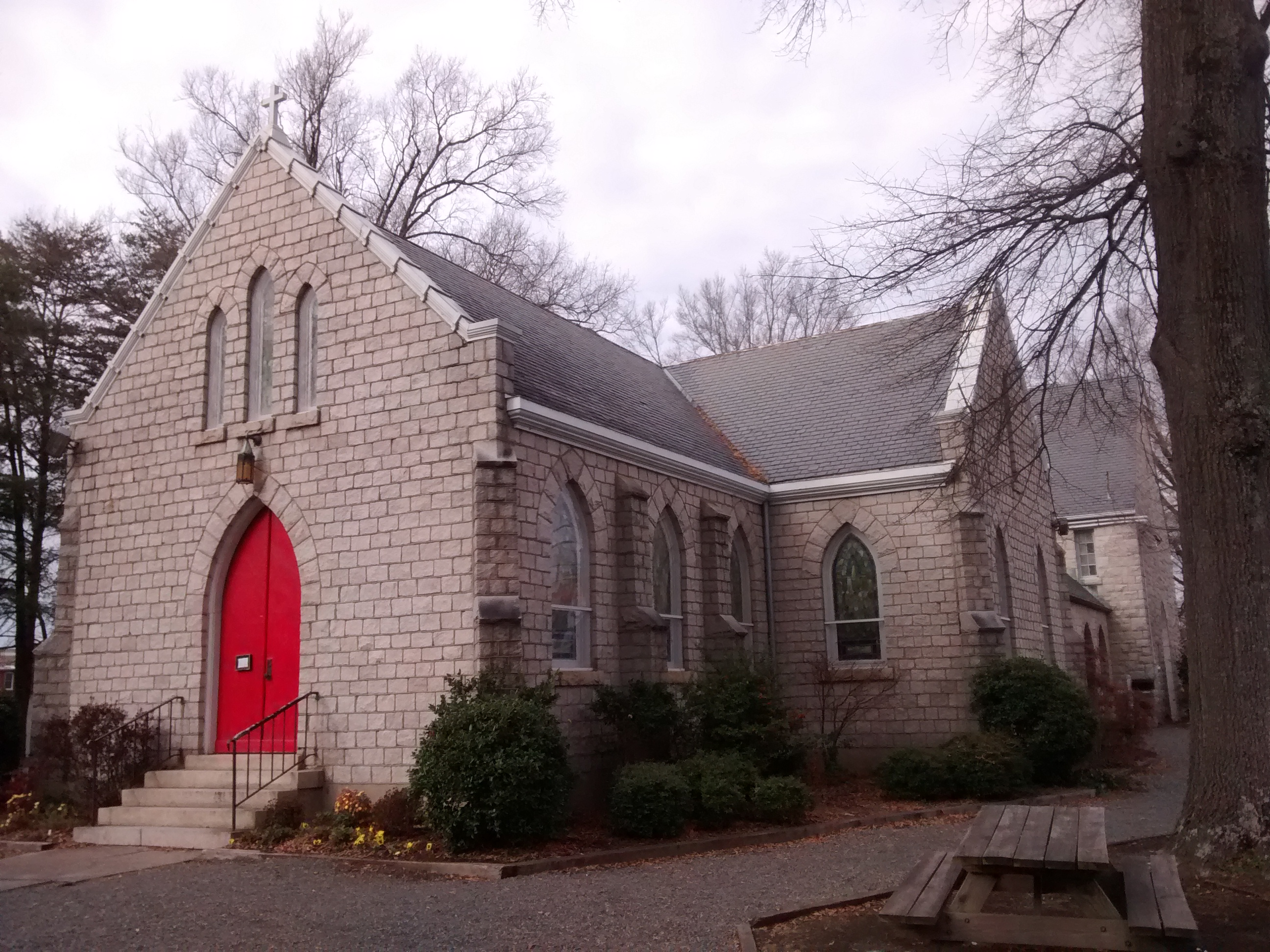
- St. Joseph's Episcopal Church in December 2014

Religion
- Affiliation: Episcopal
- District: Episcopal Diocese of North Carolina
- Status: Active

Location
- Location: 1902 W Main Street; Durham, North Carolina, United States
- Interactive map of St. Joseph's Episcopal Church

Website
- stjosephsdurham.org

St. Joseph's Episcopal Church is a mission of the Episcopal Diocese of North Carolina located in the West Durham Historic District. The church is at the corner of Iredell and West Main Streets in Durham, a short distance from Duke University's East Campus.

St. Joseph's began as a Bible study organized by William A. Erwin before the turn of the twentieth century, and became a mission of the Diocese of North Carolina in 1908. Past clergy of St. Joseph's include its first rector, John Shelby Spong (1955 to 1957), who later became bishop of the Episcopal Diocese of Newark. After 50 years as a parish (or self-supporting congregation), St. Joseph's became a mission again in 2006, when the church split over issues of human sexuality. With the support of Bishop Michael Curry, St. Joseph's called a new vicar, Rhonda Lee, in Advent of that year.

Since 2006, the church has enjoyed new life as a small congregation, where laypersons play a vital role in the life of the church. St. Joseph's has strengthened its community ties, celebrating Ash Wednesday, Holy Week, and Easter liturgies jointly with the Episcopal Center at Duke, and answering a new call to ministry with the church's homeless neighbors. St. Joseph's is a member of Durham Congregations in Action, and supports Housing for New Hope and Urban Ministries of Durham.

In May 2008, the church celebrated its centennial and launched its second hundred years with a weekend of worship and fellowship, attended by members and friends from across North Carolina and beyond.

In June 2010, Rhonda Lee left to fulfill a commitment to a Lilly Foundation grant. After a seven-month search, the Rev. Karen Clay Barfield was appointed vicar in February, 2011.
