= West Durham Historic District =

Historic district in North Carolina, United States

- U.S. National Register of Historic Places
- U.S. Historic district
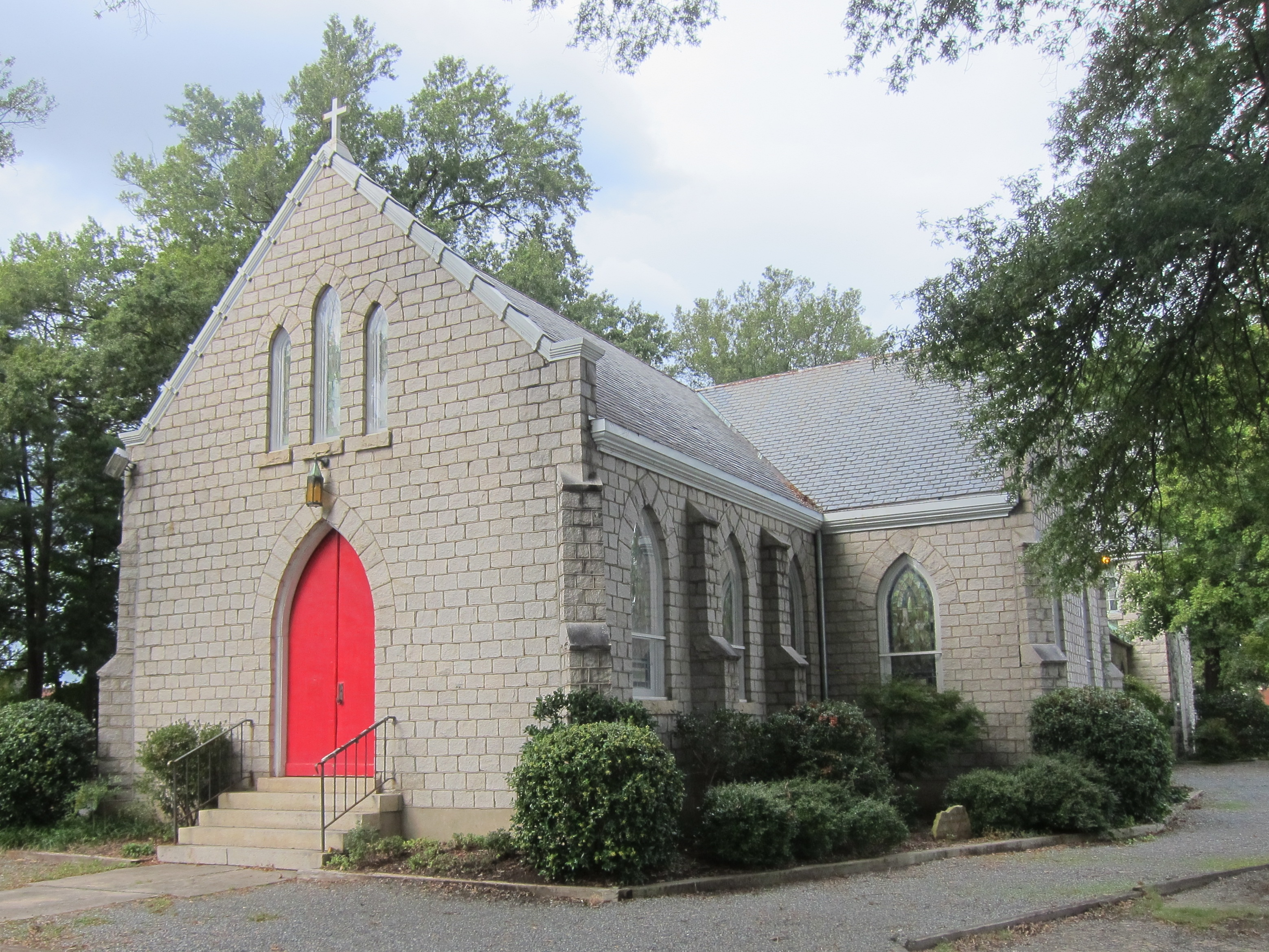
- St. Joseph's Episcopal Church

- Location within North Carolina Location within the United States
- Location: Roughly bounded by Knox, Ninth, W. Main Sts., and Rutherford St. and Carolina Ave., Durham, North Carolina
- Coordinates: 35°59′39″N 78°52′31″W
- Area: 89.4 acres (36.2 ha)
- Built: 1892
- Architectural style: Classical Revival, Queen Anne, Italianate
- MPS: Durham MRA
- NRHP reference No.: 86000680
- Added to NRHP: March 26, 1986

West Durham Historic District is a national historic district located at Durham, Durham County, North Carolina. The district encompasses 101 contributing buildings in a mixed industrial, commercial, and residential section of Durham. The buildings primarily date after 1892 and include notable examples of Classical Revival, Italianate, and Queen Anne architecture. Located in the district is the separately listed Erwin Cotton Mills Company Mill No. 1 Headquarters Building. Other notable buildings include Erwin Cotton Mills Co. Mill No. 4 (1909–10), Erwin Cotton Mills Co. worker's housing (1910s), Fidelity Bank (1920s), E. K. Powe School (1928), Blacknall Memorial Presbyterian Church (1923), Grey Stone Baptist Church (1936), and St. Joseph's Episcopal Church.

It was listed on the National Register of Historic Places in 1986.
