= Liberty Warehouse Nos. 1 and 2 =

Demolished historic building in North Carolina, US

- U.S. National Register of Historic Places
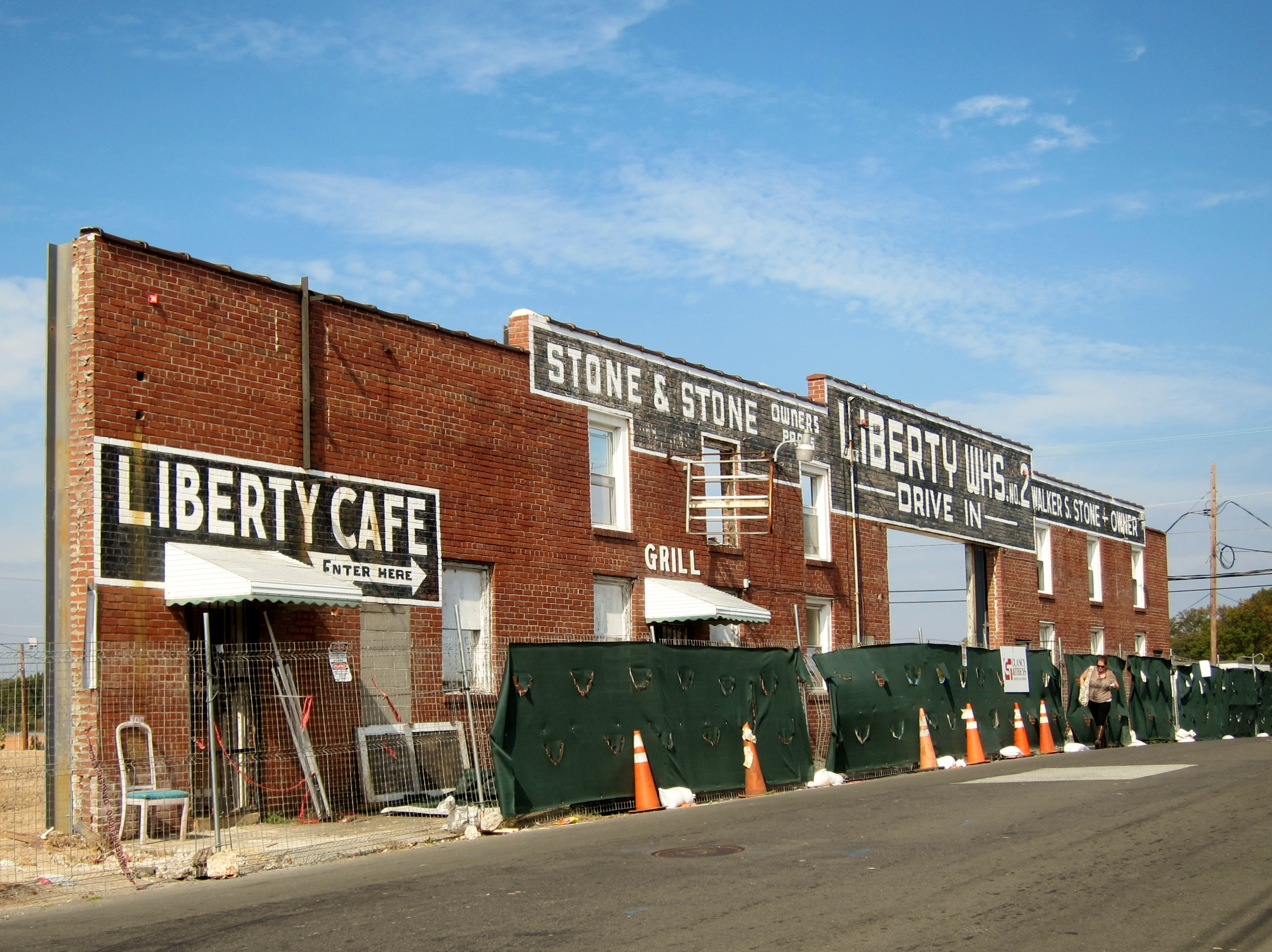

- Location within North Carolina Location within the United States
- Location: 611-613 Rigsbee Ave., Durham, North Carolina
- Coordinates: 36°00′05″N 78°54′00″W
- Area: 2.6 acres (1.1 ha)
- Built: 1938, 1948
- Architect: Harris, I.G.
- MPS: Durham MRA
- NRHP reference No.: 08000774
- Added to NRHP: August 6, 2008

Liberty Warehouse Nos. 1 and 2, also known as Liberty Warehouse No. 3 and Liberty Warehouse, was a historic tobacco auction warehouse complex located at Durham, Durham County, North Carolina. It was built in two sections in 1938 and in 1948. Together it was an expansive frame structure on a brick foundation with low-pitched, front-gabled roofs supported by massive timber columns. The last loose-leaf tobacco auctions were held in downtown Durham in the 1980s.

It was listed on the National Register of Historic Places in 2008. In May 2011 a portion of the roof collapsed and demolition of the building began in July 2014.
