= Bullington Warehouse =

Historic warehouse in North Carolina, US

- U.S. National Register of Historic Places
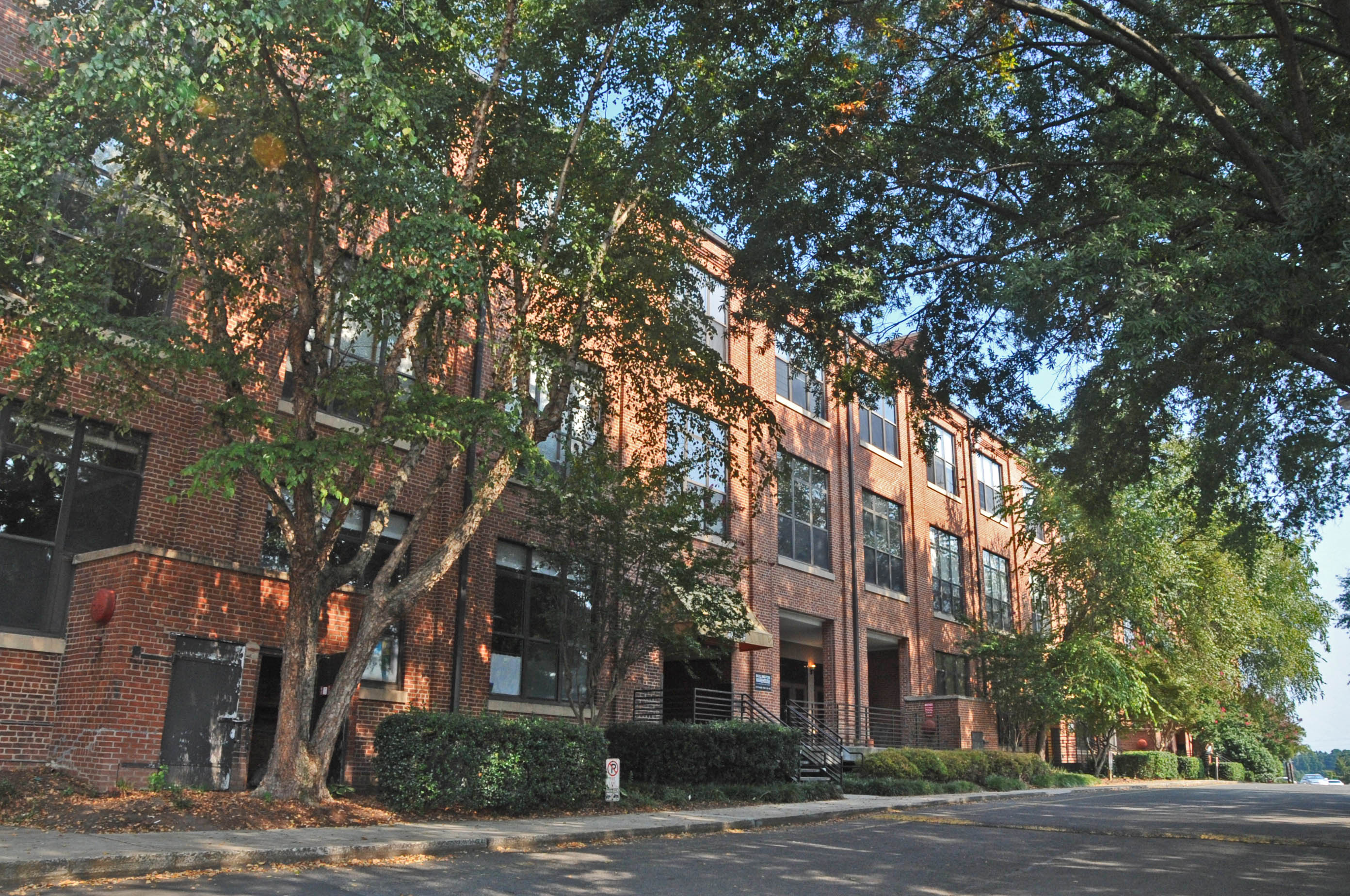
- Bullington Warehouse, March 2007

- Location within North Carolina Location within the United States
- Location: 500 N. Duke St., Durham, North Carolina
- Coordinates: 36°0′10″N 78°54′22″W
- Area: 1 acre (0.40 ha)
- Built: 1927
- Architectural style: Romanesque
- NRHP reference No.: 82003448
- Added to NRHP: August 30, 1982

Bullington Warehouse is a historic tobacco storage warehouse located at Durham, Durham County, North Carolina, United States. It was built in 1927, and is a three-story Romanesque-style brick structure divided into four units by projecting corbeled firewalls. Each unit has approximately 10,000 square feet per floor, giving a total of about 123,000 square feet. It is an example of "slow burn" masonry and wood factory construction. It was the last in a series of brick tobacco storage warehouses, unique in their architectural style, begun in 1897 and ending with this warehouse in 1927. The building has been converted to residential use.

It was listed on the National Register of Historic Places in 1982.
