= Durham Hosiery Mills Dye House =

- U.S. National Register of Historic Places
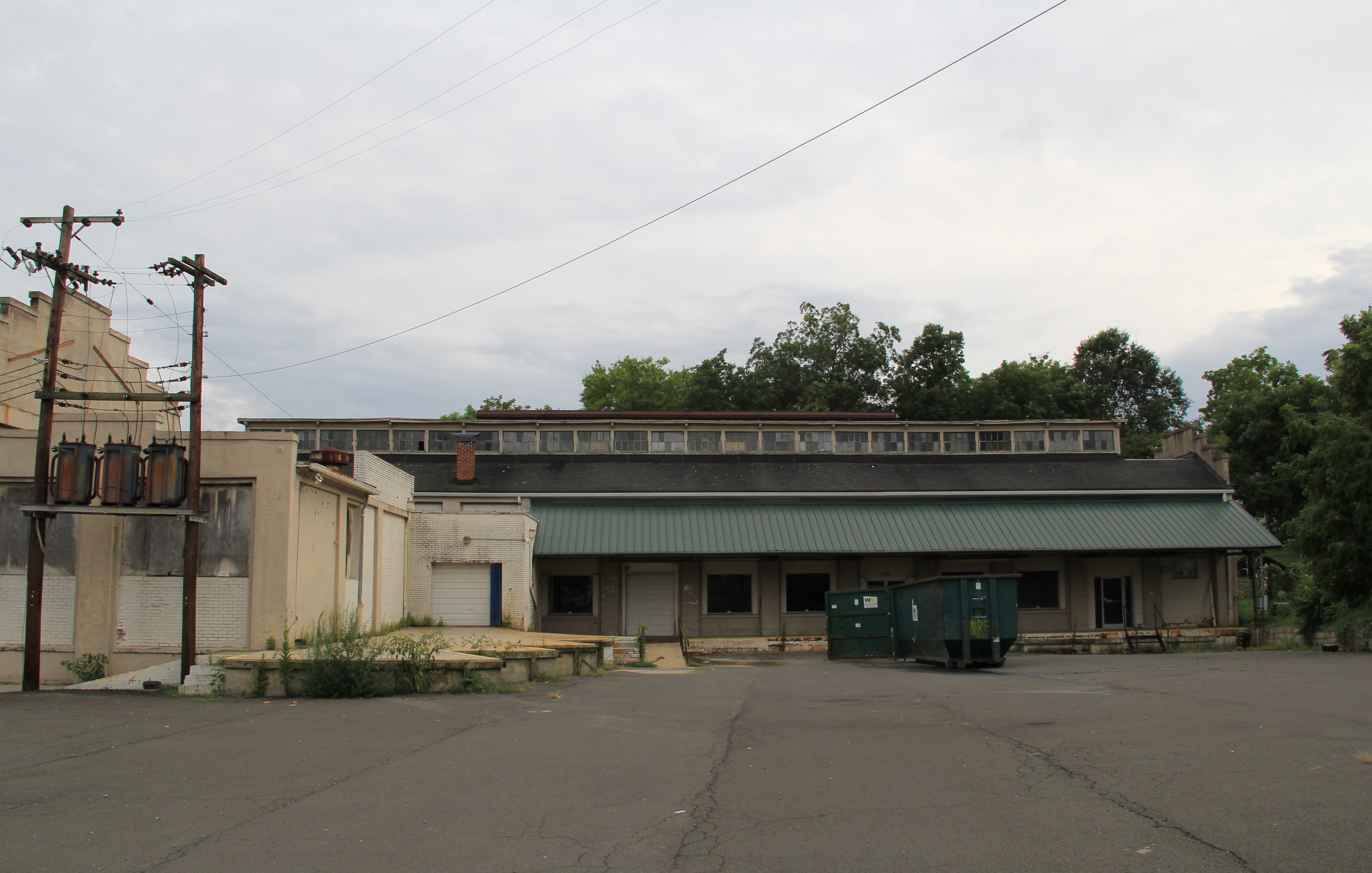
- Durham Hosiery Mills Dye House, 2014

- Location within North Carolina Location within the United States
- Location: 708-710 Gilbert St., Durham, North Carolina
- Coordinates: 35°59′44″N 78°53′23″W
- Area: 1.237 acres (0.501 ha)
- Built: 1920-1921
- Architect: Sirrine, Joseph Emory
- NRHP reference No.: 13001115
- Added to NRHP: January 22, 2014

Durham Hosiery Mills Dye House is a historic textile mill building located at Durham, Durham County, North Carolina. It was constructed by the Durham Hosiery Mills Corporation in three sections between 1920 and 1921. They are the boiler room, office / warehouse, and dyeing area. It is constructed of exterior reinforced concrete bearing walls, steel trusses and a heavy timber (“slow burn”) structural system.

It was listed on the National Register of Historic Places in 2014.
