= Venable Tobacco Company Prizery and Receiving Room =

Historic industrial buildings in North Carolina, US

- U.S. National Register of Historic Places
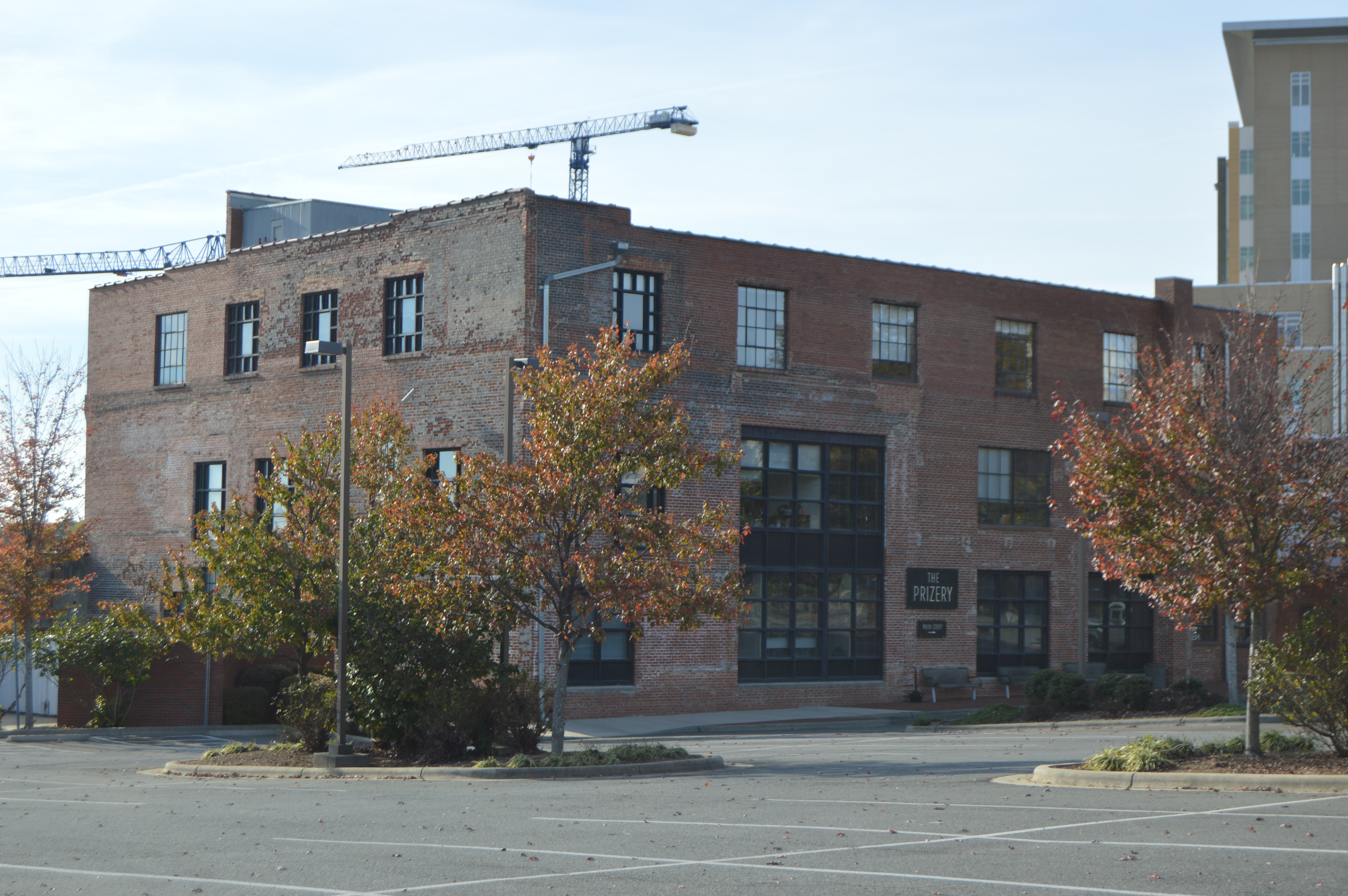
- Front and southeastern side

- Location within North Carolina Location within the United States
- Location: 302-04 East Pettigrew, Durham, North Carolina
- Coordinates: 35°59′35″N 78°53′58″W
- Area: 1.5 acres (0.61 ha)
- Built: 1930
- MPS: Durham MRA
- NRHP reference No.: 03000804
- Added to NRHP: August 21, 2003

Venable Tobacco Company Prizery and Receiving Room is a historic tobacco prizery located at Durham, Durham County, North Carolina. The prizery was built about 1930, and is a three-story, brick building. The trapezoidal shaped, one-story, concrete block receiving room was added in 1952. It is an example of "slow burn" masonry and wood factory construction. The prizery is located adjacent to the Venable Tobacco Company Warehouse, which collectively are the only structures that remain of a larger complex.

It was listed on the National Register of Historic Places in 2003.
