= Blacknall Memorial Presbyterian Church =

Presbyterian church in Durham, North Carolina

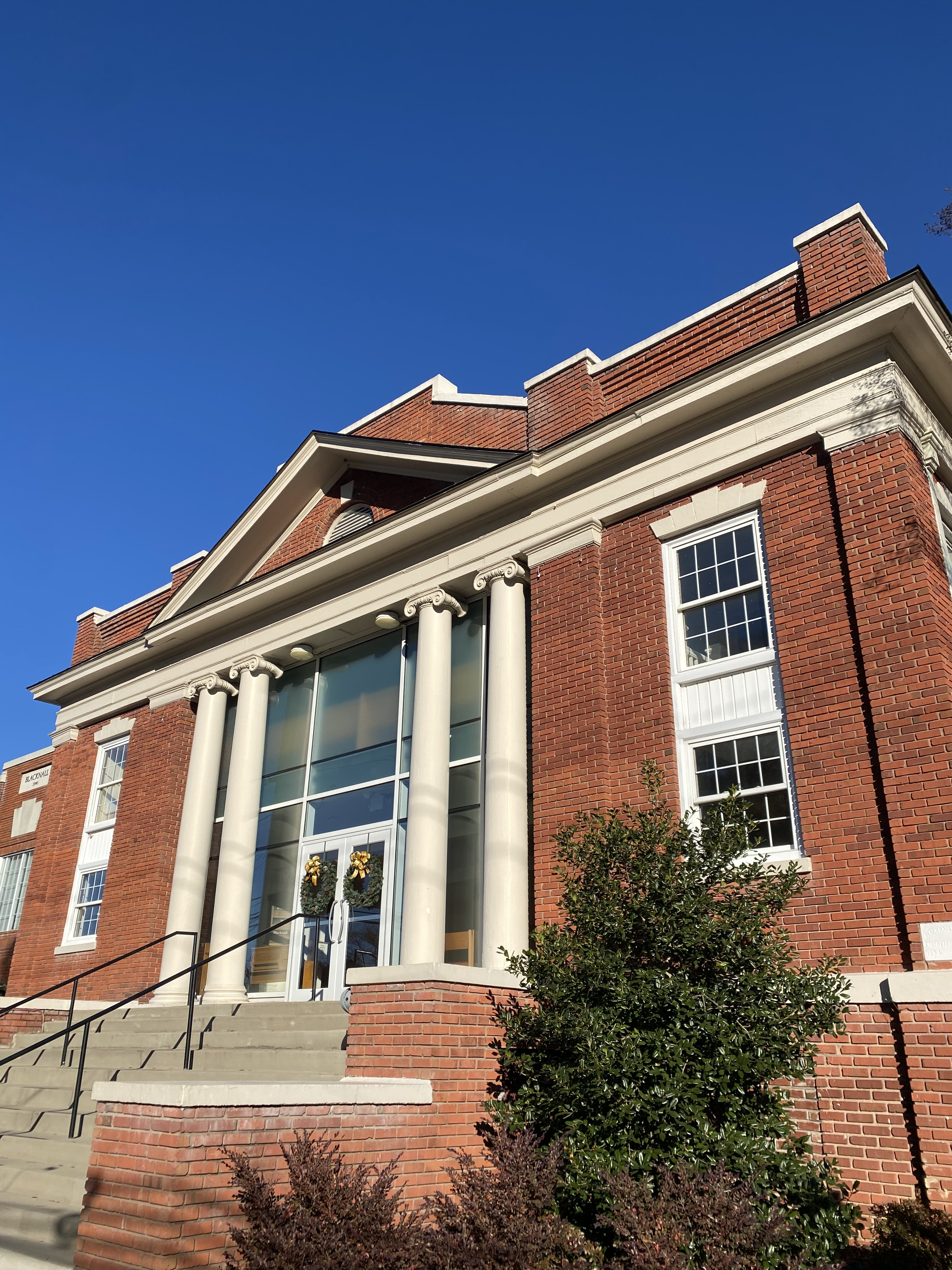
- Blacknall Memorial Church in 2024

Religion
- Affiliation: PCUSA
- Status: Active

Location
- Location: 1902 Perry Street; Durham, North Carolina, United States
- Interactive map of Blacknall Memorial Presbyterian Church
- Coordinates: 36°0′28″N 78°55′16″W

Architecture
- Type: Neoclassical Revival
- Completed: 1923

Website
- blacknall.org

Blacknall Memorial Presbyterian Church is a historic Presbyterian church in Durham, North Carolina. It is located in the West Durham Historic District.

== History ==
The church, originally called West Durham Presbyterian Church was built on 13th Street (also called Presbyterian Street) in 1905. In 1916, the church was renamed Blacknall Memorial in honor of Dr. Richard Blacknall Sr. and his son, Richard Blacknall Jr. The Blacknall family were prominent members of the West Durham community; Richard Blacknall Sr. owned Blacknall's Drugstore and James Blacknall served as the first sheriff of Durham County. The Blacknalls started the Presbyterian congregation in 1892 as a mission of First Presbyterian Church.

In January 1921, Rev. C. J. Whitley resigned as pastor of the church due to disputes with church officials over church policies.

A new church sanctuary was built in 1923 on the corner of Perry Street and 8th Street.

An educational building was added to the campus in 1964. More additions were made in 1990 and 2008. In 2015, the church announced plans to spend $1 million to purchase land on Iredell Street for a parking lot.

The church is a member of the Presbyterian Church USA under the authority of the New Hope Presbytery.
