= Durham Hosiery Mills No. 2–Service Printing Company Building =

Destroyed historic building in North Carolina, US

- U.S. National Register of Historic Places
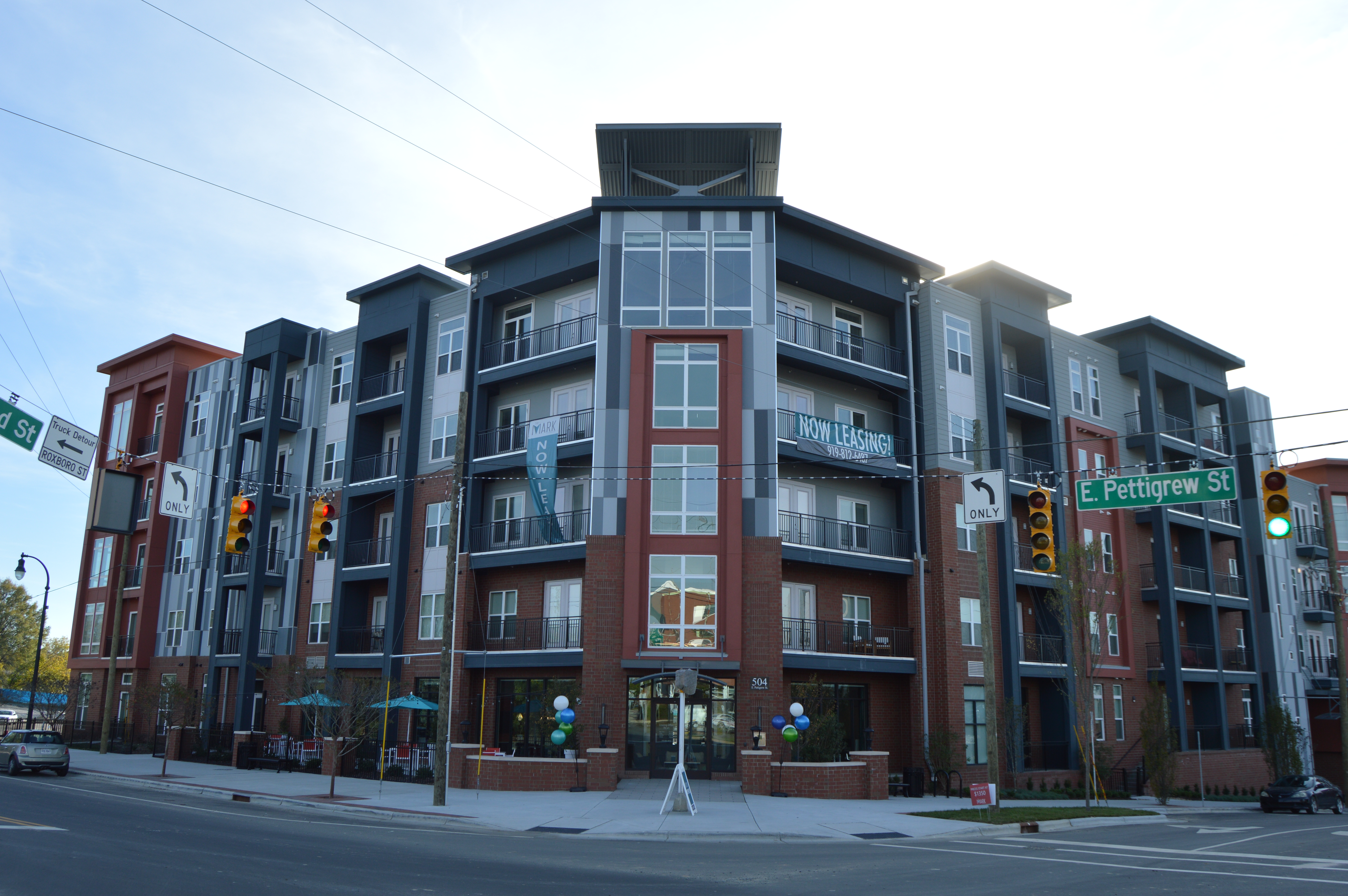
- Apartments at the site

- Location within North Carolina Location within the United States
- Location: 504 E. Pettigrew St., Durham, North Carolina
- Coordinates: 35°59′23″N 78°53′52″W
- Area: less than one acre
- Built: 1916
- MPS: Durham MRA
- NRHP reference No.: 85003055
- Added to NRHP: November 27, 1985

Durham Hosiery Mills No. 2–Service Printing Company Building was a historic textile mill building located in the Edgemont neighborhood in Durham, Durham County, North Carolina. It was the remaining section of a one-story brick building constructed by the Durham Hosiery Mills Corporation in 1916. The other section was destroyed by a fire in 1979. It featured tall segmental arched windows, heavy exposed curved rafter ends in the eaves, and a monitor roof. After 1947, it housed the Service Printing Company.

It was listed on the National Register of Historic Places in 1985. It subsequently was destroyed by fire in 1985.
