= Durham Hosiery Mill =

Historic industrial complex in North Carolina, US

- U.S. National Register of Historic Places
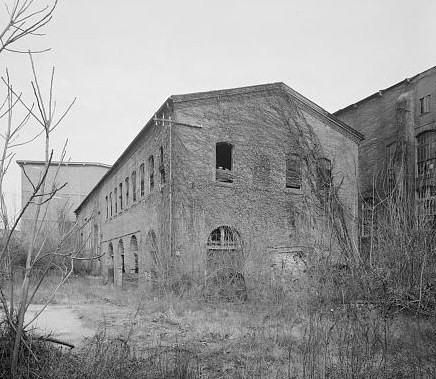
- Durham Hosiery Mill, HABS Photo

- Location within North Carolina Location within the United States
- Location: Angier Ave., Durham, North Carolina
- Coordinates: 35°59′19″N 78°53′34″W
- Area: 4.2 acres (1.7 ha)
- Built: 1902, 1904, 1906, 1912
- Architectural style: 20th Century Industrial, Romanesque Revival
- NRHP reference No.: 78001944
- Added to NRHP: November 14, 1978

Durham Hosiery Mill is a historic textile mill complex located in the Edgemont neighborhood in Durham, Durham County, North Carolina. It includes seven contributing brick buildings in the complex. The original Durham Hosiery Mill was built in 1902, and consists of a four-story main building with a six-story Romanesque Revival-style tower in front; engine, boiler, and heater houses attached at the rear, and a one-story dye house. The main building was expanded with a two-story annex in 1904, and a three-story annex in 1906. Other buildings include the triangular Annex No. 1 (1912) and a three-story brick finishing building. By 1910, the Durham Hosiery Mills Corporation was the largest manufacturer of cotton hosiery in the world. The mill was abandoned in 1922.

It was listed on the National Register of Historic Places in 1978.

== See also ==
- Durham Hosiery Mills Dye House
- Durham Hosiery Mills No. 2-Service Printing Company Building
