= Powe House =

Historic house in North Carolina, United States

- U.S. National Register of Historic Places
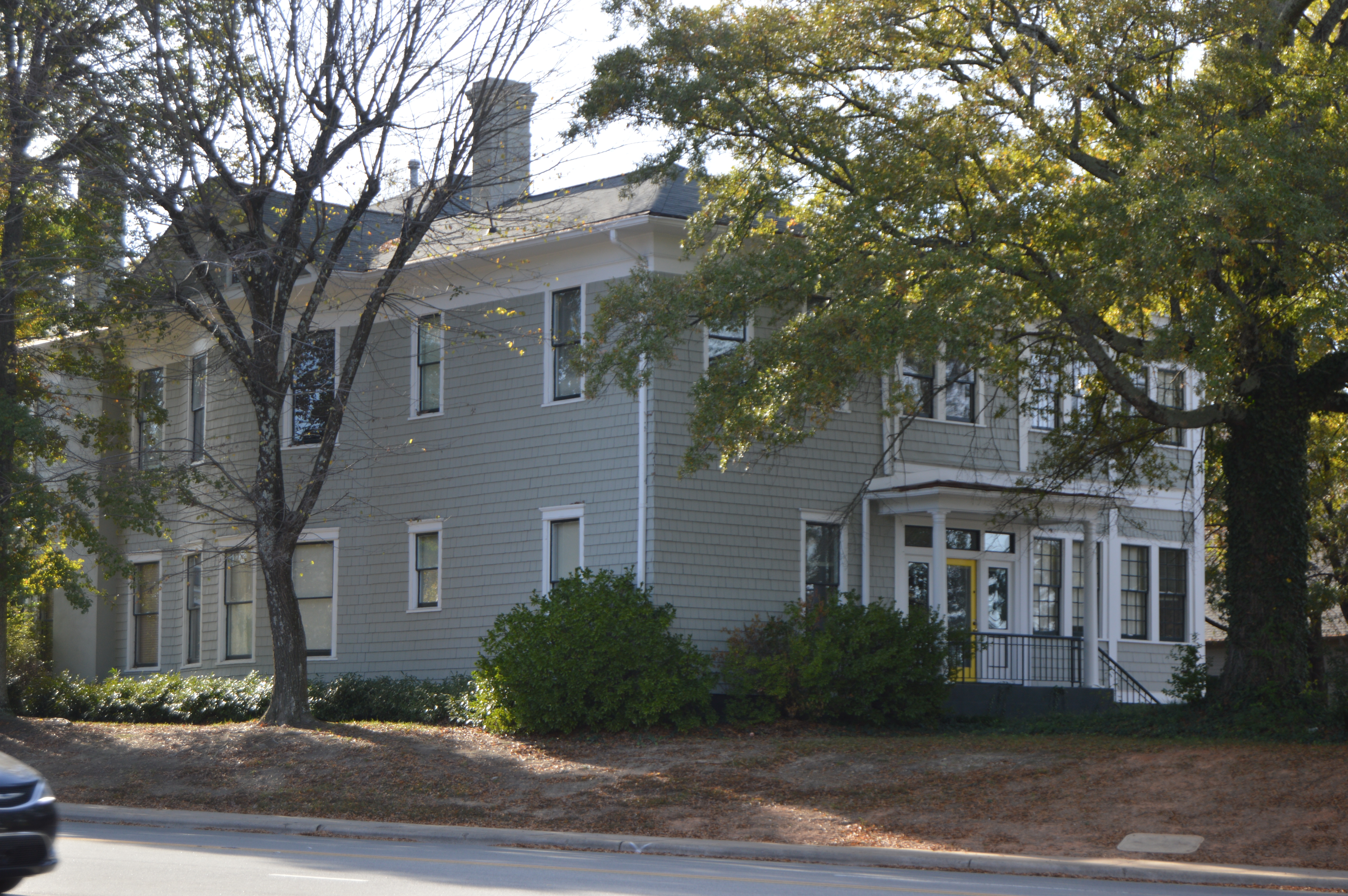
- Front and eastern side, following extensive modifications

- Location within North Carolina Location within the United States
- Location: 1503 W. Pettigrew St., Durham, North Carolina
- Coordinates: 36°0′18″N 78°55′11″W
- Area: 1.2 acres (0.49 ha)
- Built: 1900
- Architectural style: Classical Revival, Gothic
- MPS: Durham MRA
- NRHP reference No.: 85001780
- Added to NRHP: August 9, 1985

Powe House is a historic home located at Durham, Durham County, North Carolina. It was built in 1900, and is a two-story, Neoclassical style frame dwelling with a large hip-roofed core and pedimented wings. When built, it featured a one-story wraparound porch and an overlapping two-story portico at the central entrance bay.

It was listed on the National Register of Historic Places in 1985.
