= Duke Homestead and Tobacco Factory =

- U.S. National Register of Historic Places
- U.S. National Historic Landmark
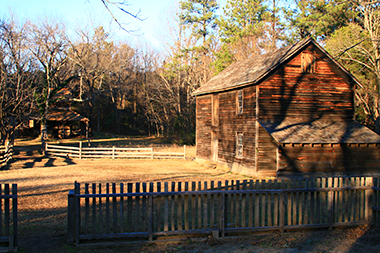
- Tobacco Barns at Duke Homestead

- Location within North Carolina Location within the United States
- Nearest city: Durham, North Carolina
- Coordinates: 36°2′6″N 78°55′16″W
- Area: 43.8 acres (17.7 ha)
- Built: 1852
- NRHP reference No.: 66000590

Significant dates
- Added to NRHP: November 13, 1966
- Designated NHL: November 13, 1966

Duke Homestead State Historic Site is a state historic site and National Historic Landmark in Durham, North Carolina. The site belongs to the North Carolina Department of Natural and Cultural resources and commemorates the place where Washington Duke founded the nation's largest early-20th-century tobacco firm, the American Tobacco Company.

== History ==
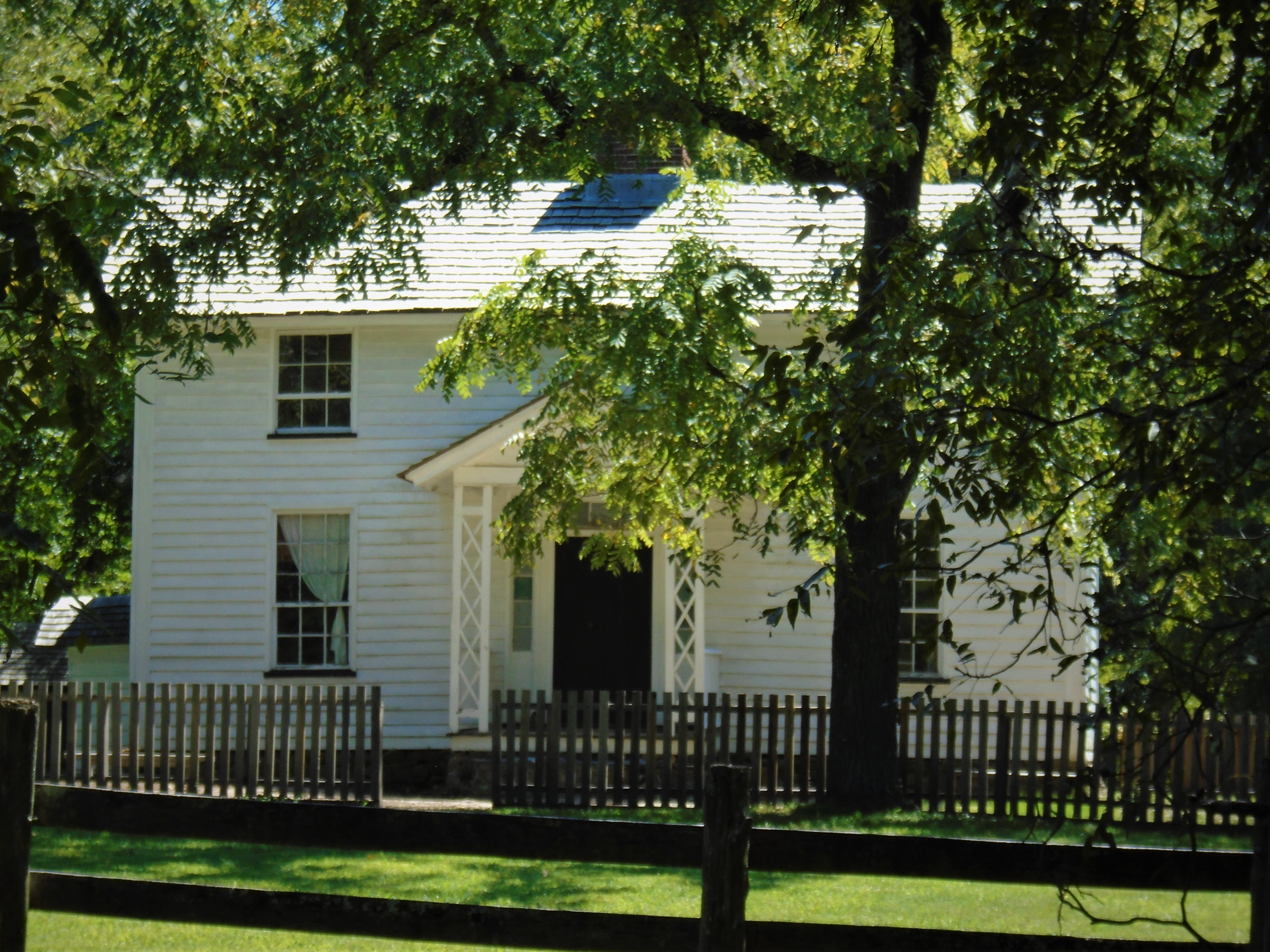
Duke Homestead - Durham, NC

The Duke Homestead was built about 1852 by Washington Duke, on a farm that was about 300 acres (120 ha) in size when the American Civil War broke out. During the war, the property was, like many others, looted by Union Army. With little left beyond a small supply of tobacco, the family shifted from tobacco farming to tobacco processing, introducing cigarettes in 1881 to compete with loose-leaf tobacco.

This property is where the Dukes did their early tobacco processing, eventually moving into downtown Durham in 1874. The Duke business was incorporated as the American Tobacco Company in 1890, and was the largest tobacco company in the world until an antitrust suit broke it up in 1911.

In 1931, the farm was purchased by Duke University, and in 1966, the Duke Homestead was designated a National Historic Landmark by the National Park Service. It became a North Carolina State Historic Site in 1974, administered by the North Carolina State Division of Archives and History.

== Description ==
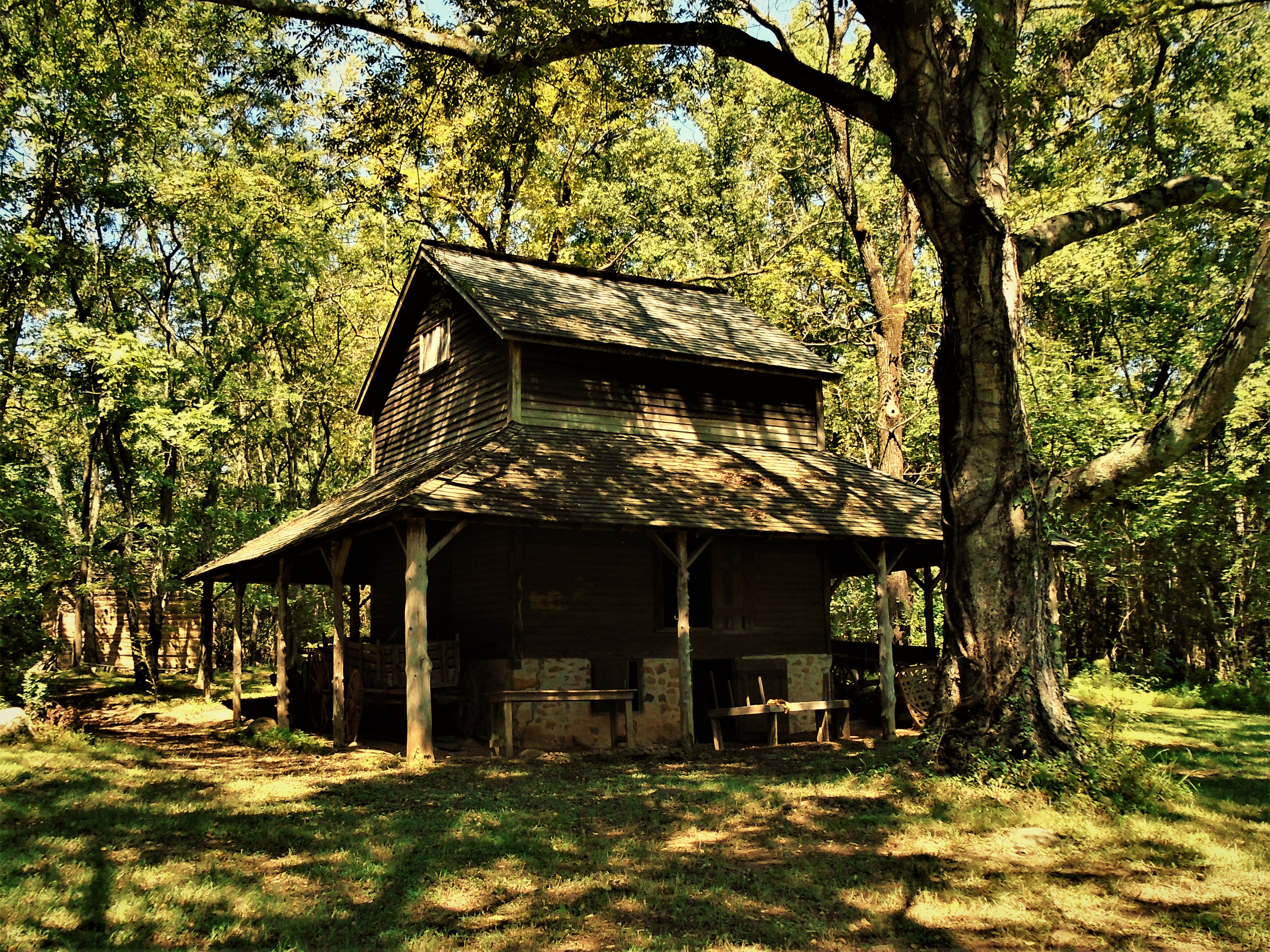
Duke Homestead tobacco pack house

The property now consists of more than 40 acres (16 ha) of the original Duke lands, on which stand the original Duke Homestead and several barn-like "factory" structures in which the Dukes cured, processed, and packed their tobacco. The very first building in which they worked, a log barn, was destroyed by fire, and was reconstructed in 1931.

== Museum ==
Today, the site is a museum where tourists can view the restored 1852 Duke Homestead with four furnished rooms, tobacco barns and various artifacts. The visitor center features the Tobacco Museum, with exhibits about tobacco farming, processing and the history of tobacco. Various readings and presentations are available in the Visitor Center.

== See also ==
- List of National Historic Landmarks in North Carolina
- National Register of Historic Places listings in Durham County, North Carolina
