= Venable Tobacco Company Warehouse =

Historic warehouse in North Carolina, US

- U.S. National Register of Historic Places
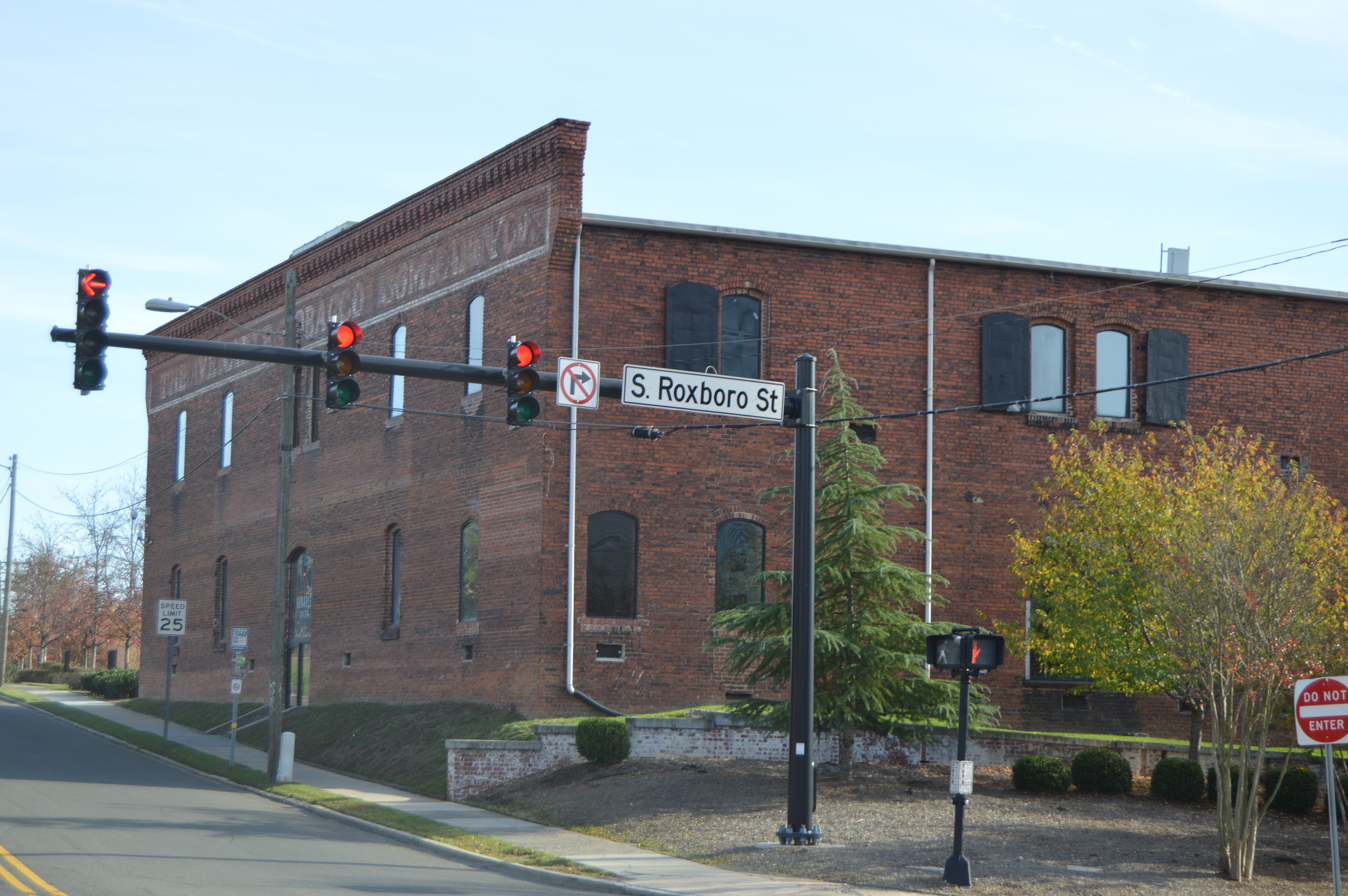
- Front and part of the northwestern side

- Location within North Carolina Location within the United States
- Location: 302-304 E. Pettigrew St., Durham, North Carolina
- Coordinates: 35°59′31″N 78°54′0″W
- Area: Less than 1 acre (0.40 ha)
- Built: 1905, 1910s
- MPS: Durham MRA
- NRHP reference No.: 85001847
- Added to NRHP: August 9, 1985

Venable Tobacco Company Warehouse is a historic tobacco storage warehouse located at Durham, Durham County, North Carolina. It consists of three storage units: Unit 1 and Unit 2 were built in 1905 and Unit 3 in the 1910s. It is a two-story, brick structure and is an example of "slow burn" masonry and wood factory construction. The warehouse is located adjacent to the Venable Tobacco Company Prizery and Receiving Room, which collectively are the only structures that remain of a larger complex.

It was listed on the National Register of Historic Places in 1985.
