= Erwin Cotton Mills Company Mill No. 1 Headquarters Building =

Historic industrial building in North Carolina, US

- U.S. National Register of Historic Places
- U.S. Historic district – Contributing property
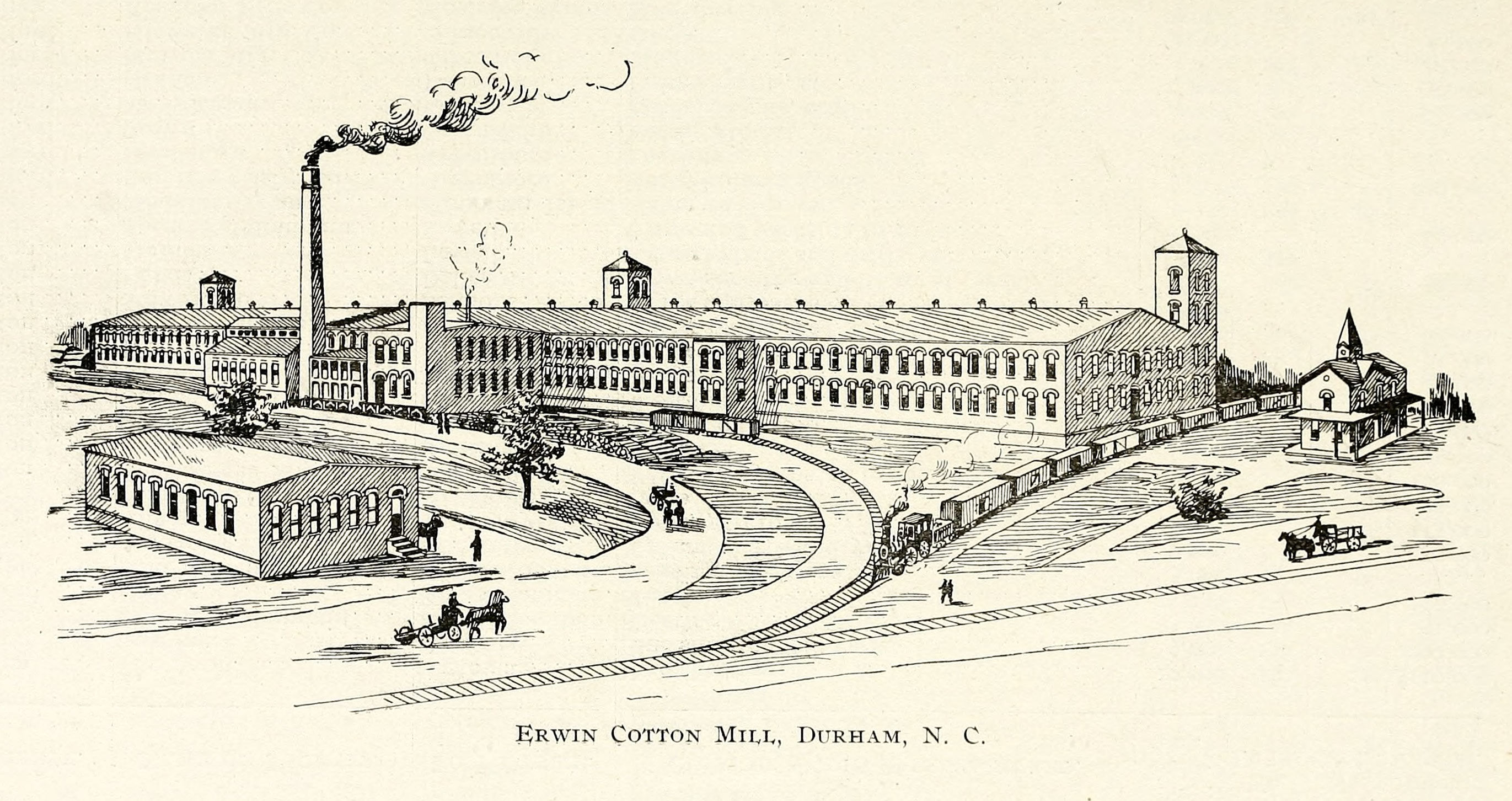
- Erwin Cotton Mills (1897)

- Location within North Carolina Location within the United States
- Location: W. Main and 9th Sts., Durham, North Carolina
- Coordinates: 35°59′19″N 78°53′34″W
- Area: 10.1 acres (4.1 ha)
- Built: 1892
- Architectural style: Late Victorian, Vernacular Late Victorian
- NRHP reference No.: 84002724
- Added to NRHP: November 20, 1984

Erwin Cotton Mills Company Mill No. 1 Headquarters Building, also known as Erwin Square, is a historic textile mill complex located at Durham, Durham County, North Carolina. The mill was built in 1892, and is a two-story, 748 feet long, brick building. It features three square towers projecting from the east facade and hundreds of large and closely spaced windows. The building exemplifies "slow burn" construction with its exterior load bearing brick walls and its heavy timber heart pine beams and columns. The headquarters building is a Late Victorian style brick building built in 1892 and enlarged in 1896 and 1905. Attached to the headquarters building is a warehouse. In 1983–1984, the complex was renovated as offices and apartments.

It was listed on the National Register of Historic Places in 1984. It is located in the West Durham Historic District.
