= Hillside Park High School =

Historic school building in North Carolina, United States

- U.S. National Register of Historic Places
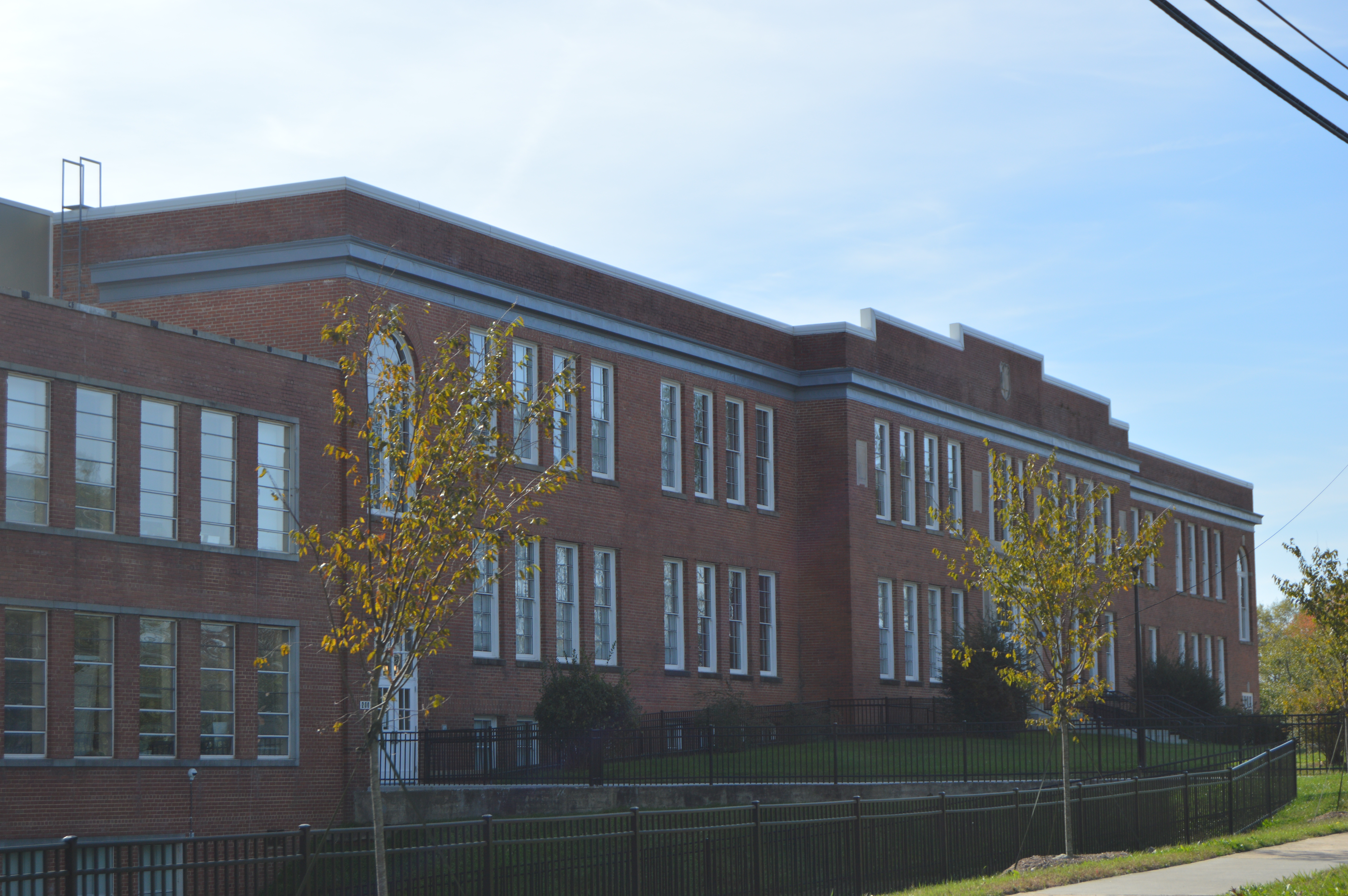
- Front of the school

- Location within North Carolina Location within the United States
- Location: 200 E. Umstead Street, Durham, North Carolina
- Coordinates: 35°58′56″N 78°54′09″W
- Area: 4 acres (1.6 ha)
- Built: 1922, 1954-1955, c. 1960
- Architect: Milburn, Heister & Company, Hackney & Knott
- Architectural style: Classical Revival, Modern Movement
- MPS: Durham MRA
- NRHP reference No.: 13001026
- Added to NRHP: December 26, 2012

Hillside Park High School, also known as Hillside High School, James A. Whitted Elementary School, and James A. Whitted Junior High School, is a historic school building for African-American students located at Durham, Durham County, North Carolina. The original Classical Revival portion dates to 1922 and is a T-shaped, two-story building on a full basement. A three-story red-brick, T-shaped Modern Movement-style addition was built in 1954–1955, with a one-story-on-basement gymnasium rear wing. Also on the property is a contributing greenhouse built about 1960. The school served the African-American student population of Durham until 1970, when the schools were integrated.

It was listed on the National Register of Historic Places in 2013.
