= City Garage Yard and Fire Drill Tower =

Historic buildings in North Carolina, US

- U.S. National Register of Historic Places
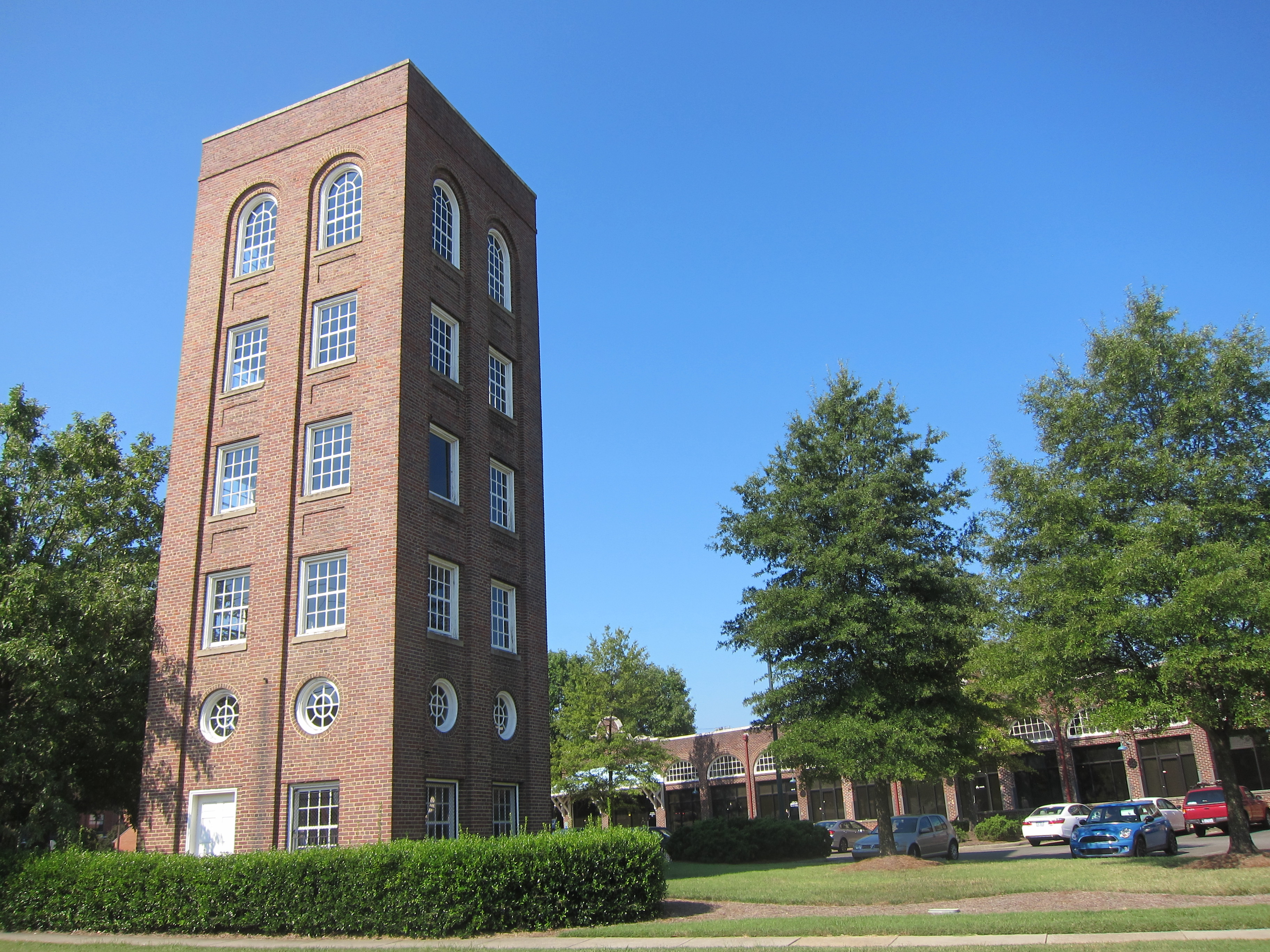
- Fire Drill Tower

- Location within North Carolina Location within the United States
- Location: 501 Washington St. Durham, North Carolina
- Coordinates: 36°0′38″N 78°54′37″W
- Area: 2.8 acres (1.1 ha)
- Built: 1927, 1928, c. 1948
- Architect: Atwood & Nash
- Architectural style: Romanesque, Colonial Revival, et.al.
- MPS: Durham MRA
- NRHP reference No.: 00000394
- Added to NRHP: May 3, 2000

City Garage Yard and Fire Drill Tower, also known as City Place, is a historic municipal services complex located at Durham, Durham County, North Carolina. The City Garage is an expansive, largely one-story, polygonal structure with multiple equipment-size access bays. It features arcaded bays and stepped and rounded parapets. The Garage was built in 1927, with 1935, 1940s, c. 1955, and c. 1965 additions.

The Fire Drill Tower (1928) is a narrow six-story building. It features pilasters, blind arches, and round-arched belfry openings. Also on the property are the contributing Signs and Markings Shop (c. 1948, c. 1965) and the Employees' Restroom (c. 1948).

It was listed on the National Register of Historic Places in 2000.

== Gallery ==
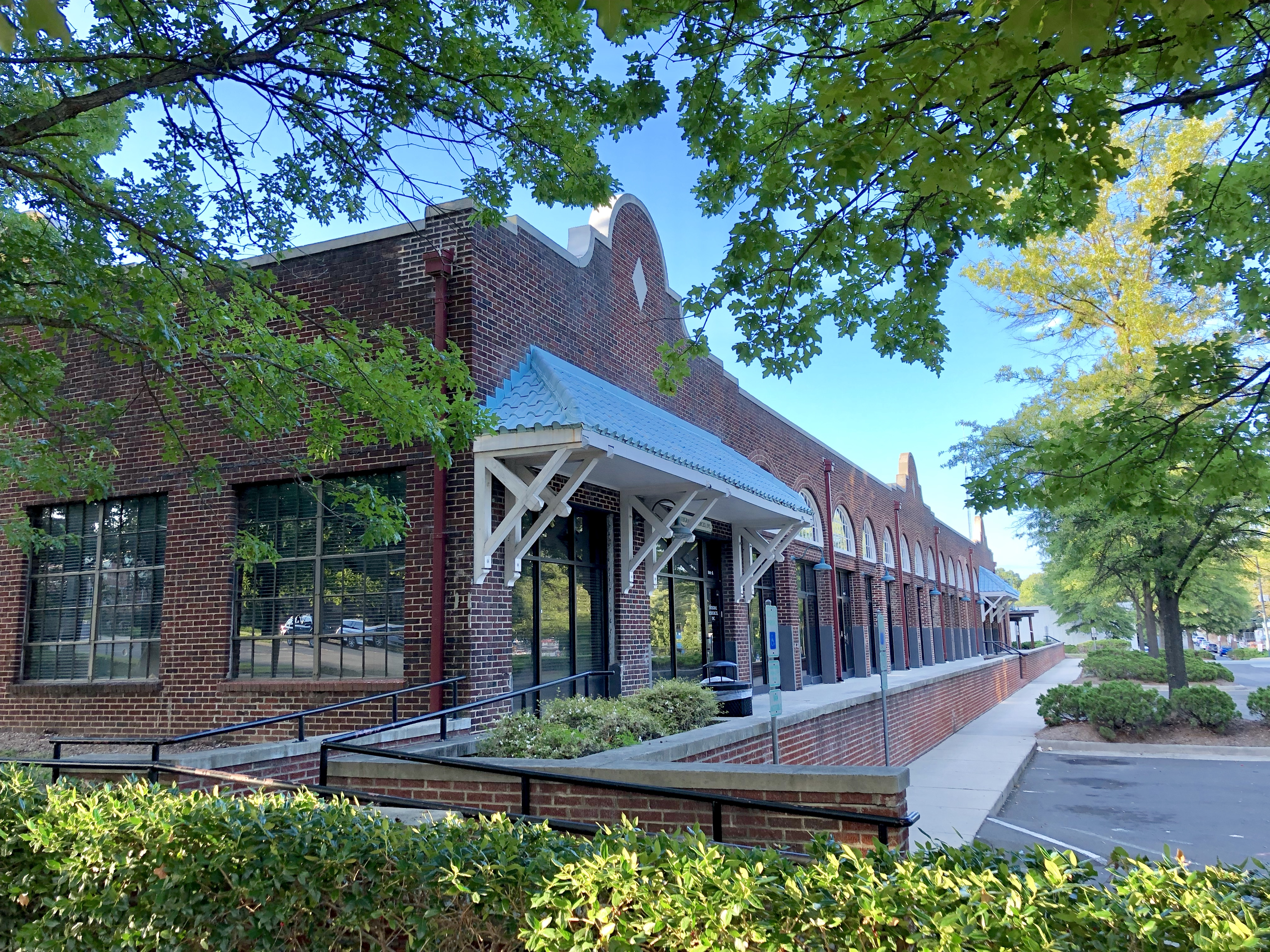
September 2019
