= Scott and Roberts Dry Cleaning Plant, Office, and Store =

Historic building in North Carolina, US

- U.S. National Register of Historic Places
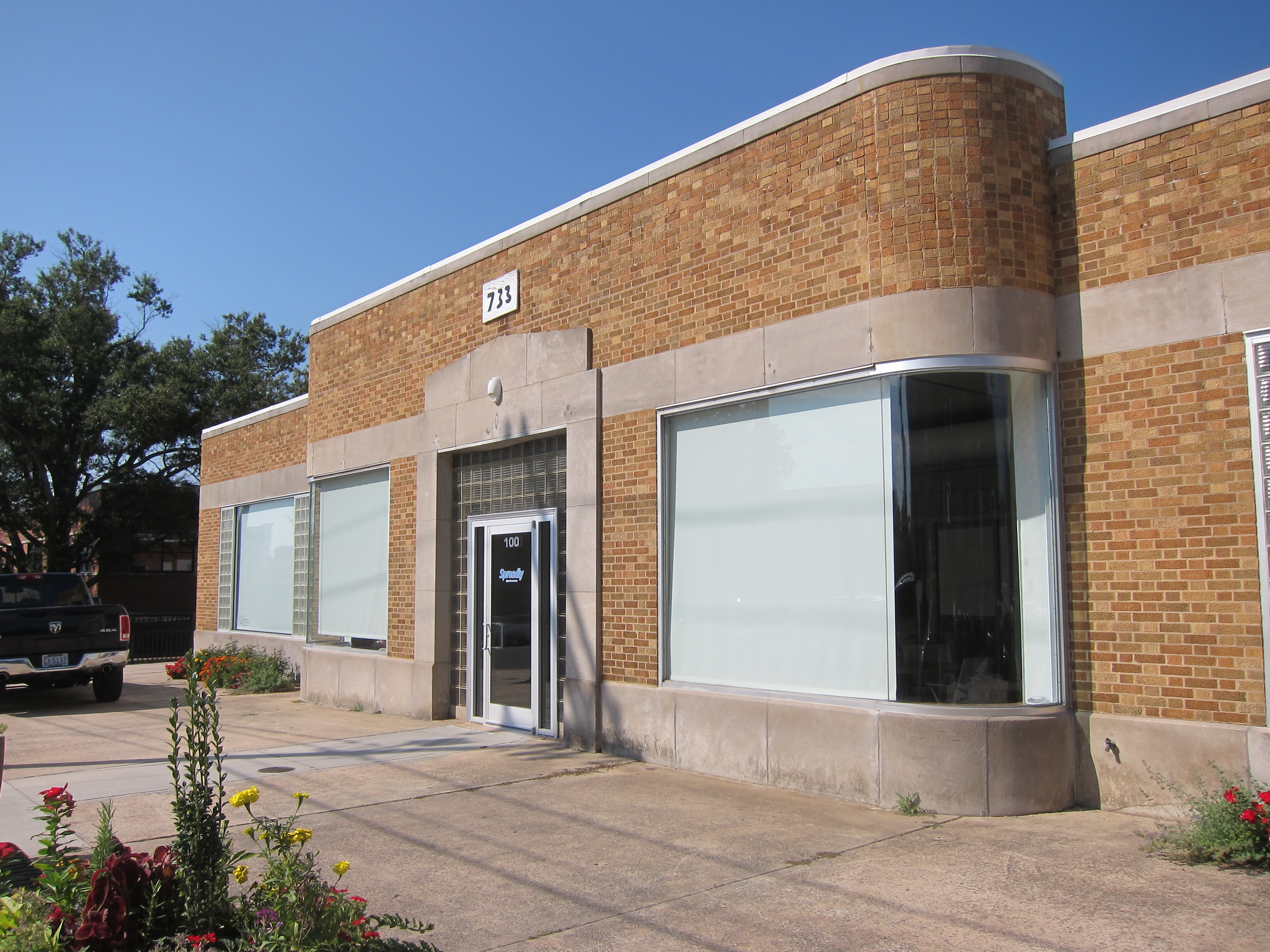

- Location within North Carolina Location within the United States
- Location: 733 Foster St., Durham, North Carolina
- Coordinates: 36°00′18″N 78°54′06″W
- Area: .397 acres (0.161 ha)
- Built: 1947
- Architectural style: Moderne
- NRHP reference No.: 12000345
- Added to NRHP: June 20, 2012

Scott and Roberts Dry Cleaning Plant, Office, and Store is a historic dry cleaning plant, office, and store located at Durham, Durham County, North Carolina. It was built in 1947, and is a one-story, three bay Moderne-brick building on a partial concrete basement. It features a projecting center bay, plate-glass storefront windows, and a centered front entrance with original glass-block entrance surround.

It was listed on the National Register of Historic Places in 2012.
