= Ephphatha Church =

Historic church in North Carolina, United States

- U.S. National Register of Historic Places
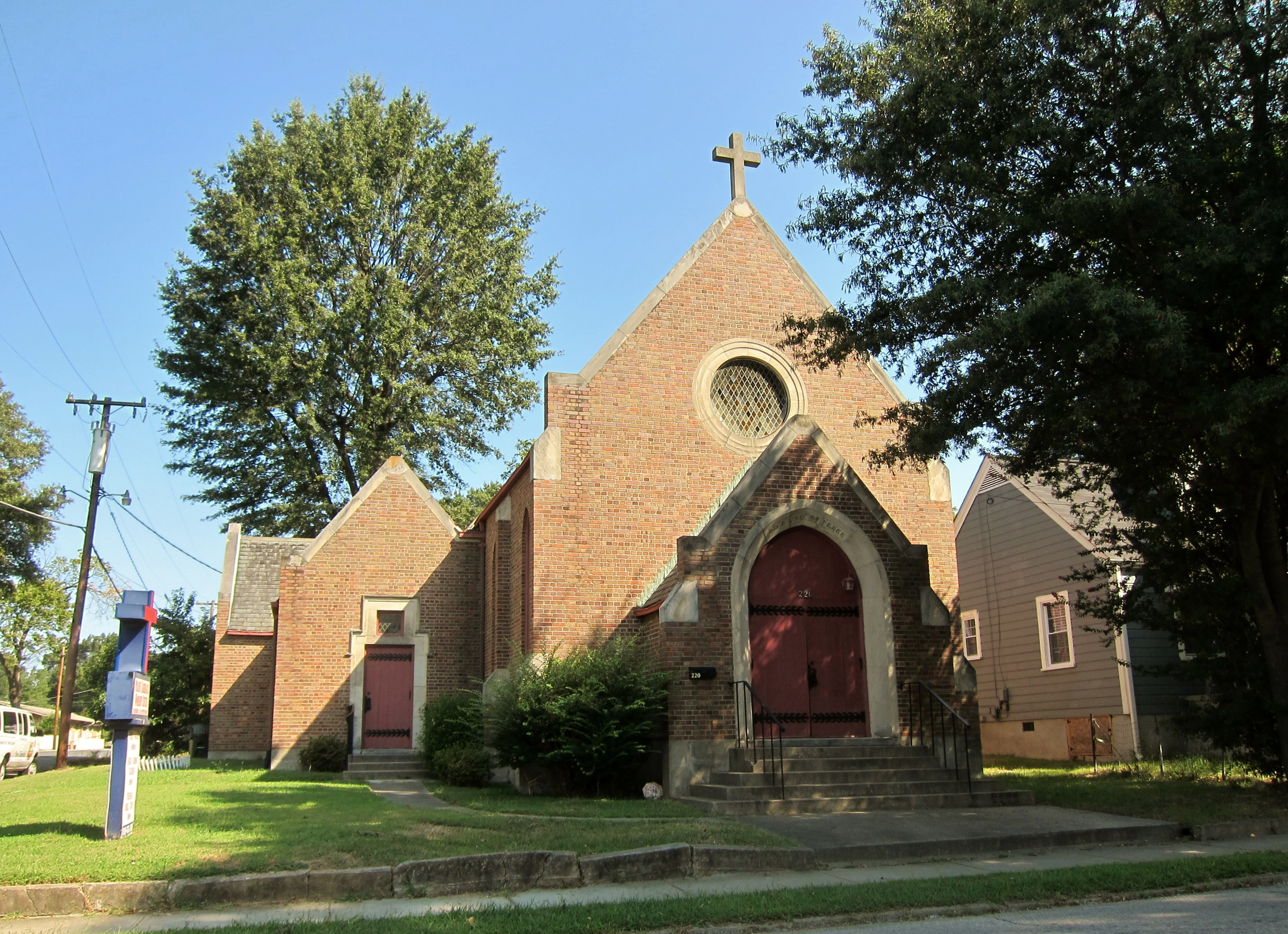

- Location within North Carolina Location within the United States
- Location: 220 W. Geer St. Durham, North Carolina
- Coordinates: 36°0′20″N 78°53′53″W
- Area: less than one acre
- Built: 1930
- Architect: Carr, George W., Sr.
- Architectural style: Gothic Revival
- MPS: Durham MRA
- NRHP reference No.: 85001778
- Added to NRHP: August 09, 1985

Ephphatha Church, also known as Faith Tabernacle, is a historic Episcopal church at 220 W. Geer Street in Durham, Durham County, North Carolina. It was built in 1930, and is a small, one-story, six-bay deep, Gothic Revival-style brick building. It is one of only four churches in the United States built exclusively for a deaf congregation. The Episcopal Diocese of North Carolina rented the Ephphatha Church building to another congregation from 1977 until early 1981, then sold the building.

It was added to the National Register of Historic Places in 1985.

In 2017, the church was purchased by American architect Phil Freelon and his wife Nnenna. It now operates as a 501 (c)3 arts organization, NorthStar Church of the Arts, presenting work by artists of color and those with historically limited access to arts experiences. Their hallmark program is a monthly queer-affirming, inclusive Sunday Service that uses art as a healing modality.
