= Emmanuel AME Church (Durham, North Carolina) =

Historic church in North Carolina, United States

- U.S. National Register of Historic Places
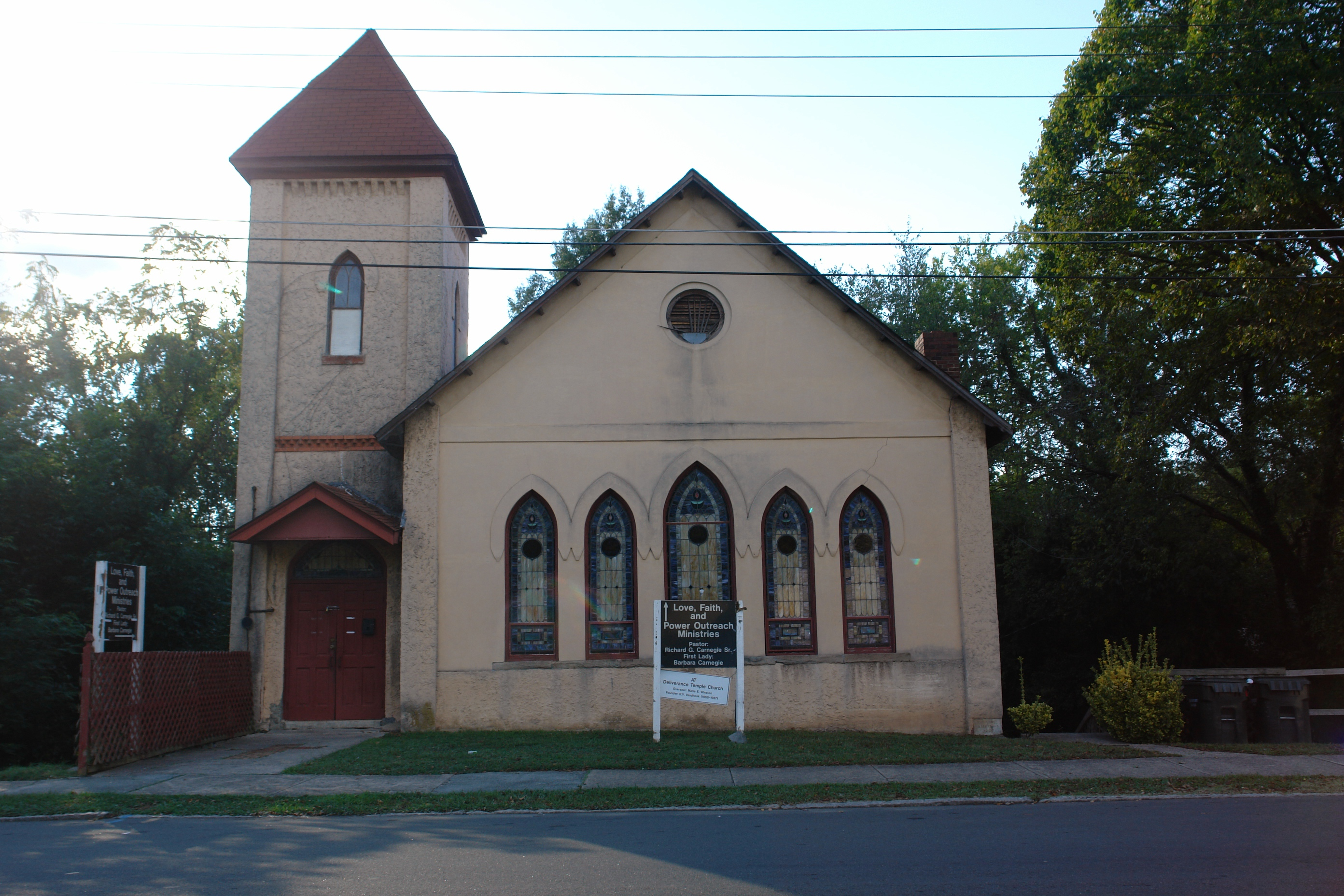

- Location within North Carolina Location within the United States
- Location: 710 Kent St., Durham, North Carolina
- Coordinates: 35°59′40″N 78°55′8″W
- Area: less than one acre
- Built: 1888
- Architect: Smith, Capt. Peyton
- Architectural style: Gothic Revival
- MPS: Durham MRA
- NRHP reference No.: 85001775
- Added to NRHP: August 09, 1985

Emmanuel AME Church, also known as Deliverance Temple Holy Church, is a historic African Methodist Episcopal church building located at 710 Kent Street in Durham, Durham County, North Carolina. The Gothic Revival building was constructed in 1888. The 30-inch walls were covered with stucco in 1962. Both the bricks and land for the church were donated by Richard B. Fitzgerald, a prominent African American brickmaker.

It was added to the National Register of Historic Places in 1985.
