= Bartlett Mangum House =

Historic house in North Carolina, United States

- U.S. National Register of Historic Places
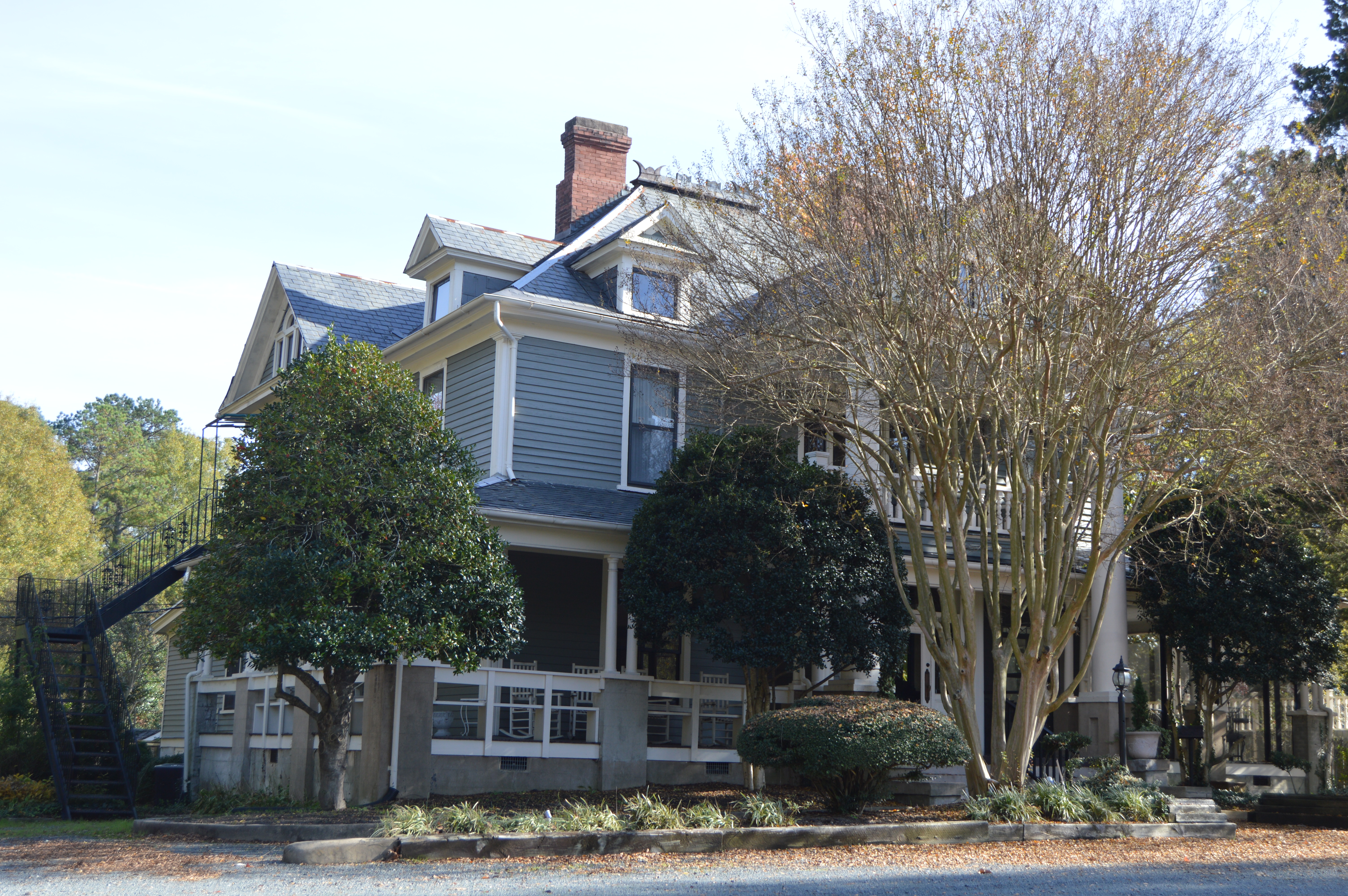
- Front and northern side

- Location within North Carolina Location within the United States
- Location: 2701 Chapel Hill Rd., Durham, North Carolina
- Coordinates: 35°58′37″N 78°56′10″W
- Area: Less than 1 acre (0.40 ha)
- Built: 1908
- Architect: William A. Wilkerson
- Architectural style: Classical Revival
- MPS: Durham MRA
- NRHP reference No.: 89000446
- Added to NRHP: May 25, 1989

Bartlett Mangum House, also known as Clair's Cafe, is a historic home located at Durham, Durham County, North Carolina. It was built in 1908, and is a 2 1/2-story, Classical Revival style frame dwelling. It consists of the main block, three bays wide and two bays deep, with projecting polygonal side bays and a one-story rear ell. It features a high hipped roof, projecting gabled dormers and tall chimneys, and a two-tier portico carried by massive stuccoed Doric order columns. After ceasing residential usage in the 1960s, the building has housed a church, a retail clothes store, and restaurant.

It was listed on the National Register of Historic Places in 1989.
