= Kinchen Holloway House =

Historic house in Durham, North Carolina

- U.S. National Register of Historic Places
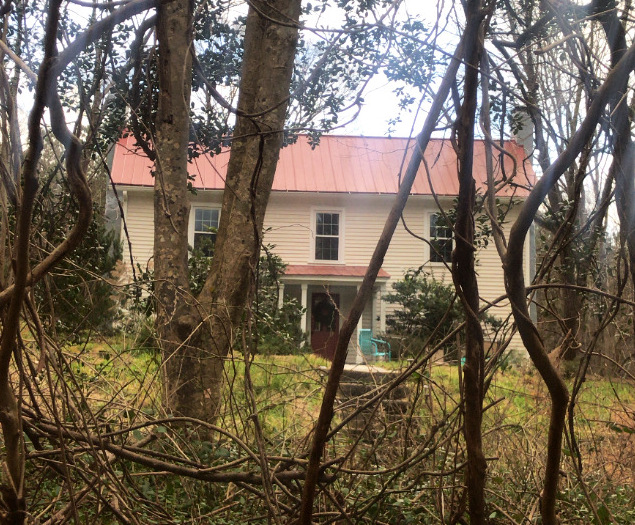
- Kinchen Holloway House in January 2021

- Location within North Carolina Location within the United States
- Location: 4418 Guess Rd., Durham, North Carolina
- Coordinates: 36°4′27″N 78°56′3″W
- Area: 1.8 acres (0.73 ha)
- Built: c. 1870
- Architectural style: I-house
- NRHP reference No.: 08000814
- Added to NRHP: August 29, 2008

Kinchen Holloway House, also known as Guess Mill House, is a historic house in Durham, North Carolina. It was built about 1870, and is a two-story, three-bay, frame I-house with a one-story, gable-roof rear ell. The house was built by Kinchen Holloway, a farmer and miller.

It was listed on the National Register of Historic Places in 2008.
