= Mutual Tower =

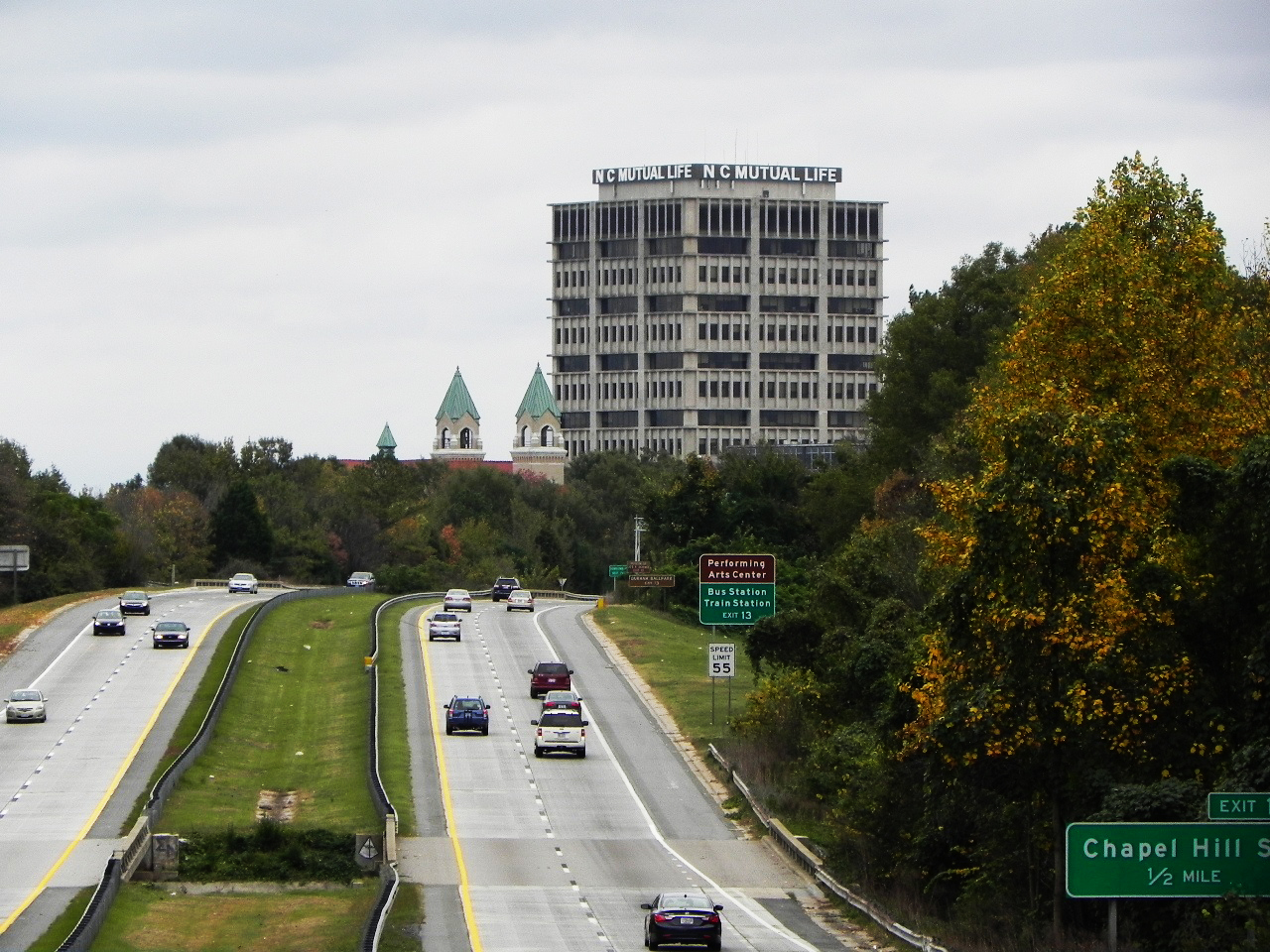

General information
- Location: 411 West Chapel Hill Street; Durham, North Carolina, USA
- Coordinates: 35°59′47″N 78°54′30″W
- Construction started: 1963
- Completed: 1965
- Owner: Turnbridge Equities
- Landlord: CBRE Group

Height
- Top floor: 14

Design and construction
- Architects: M.A. Ham Associates; Welton Becket and Associates

Mutual Tower is a 252,000 square foot, 14-story commercial building located in Durham, North Carolina. Dedicated in 1966, the building was originally constructed as the North Carolina Mutual Life Insurance Company Building.

As the N.C. Mutual Life Building, it was best known as the headquarters of the largest African American-owned business in the United States, a cornerstone of Durham's Black Wall Street, and a symbol of upward mobility for African Americans in the South. Notable for its original mid-century design and use of innovative construction practices, it also held the distinction of being the tallest Black-owned building in the United States and the tallest building in Durham until 1987.

== History ==
The North Carolina Mutual Life Insurance Company (N.C. Mutual) was established in 1898 by prominent Durham-based Black investors, including entrepreneur John Merrick and physician Aaron McDuffie Moore, and later presided over by C.C. Spaulding. Through the first half of the 20th century, it grew to become one of the largest African American-owned businesses in the United States, and the largest Black-owned and operated business in the world. N.C. Mutual commissioned the eponymous building to serve as its headquarters after outgrowing their existing offices at the Mechanics and Farmers Bank Building in Durham.

The Los Angeles-based architectural firm Welton Becket and Associates was selected for the building's design in part because of their racially equitable hiring practices; local firm M.A. Ham Associates, Inc. were the associate architects on the project. The consulting engineers were Seelye, Stevenson, Value, and Knecht of New York, and Rea Construction Co. of Charlotte served as the general contractors.

Groundbreaking began in the spring of 1963 on a block bounded by West Chapel Hill Street, Willard Street, Duke Street, and Jackson Street in downtown Durham. The site was formerly occupied by The Terrace and Four Acres, two late-19th and early-20th century mansions in the Queen Anne Victorian and Chateauesque styles owned by local industrialist B.N. Duke.

=== Construction ===
Construction costs were initially estimated at $3.5 million. At the time permits were issued, the building inspector noted that it was the largest single private building project authorized in Durham to date. Development of the tower generated excitement in the Durham community and beyond: construction professionals from around the country reportedly traveled to Durham to observe the slip form method of pouring the 12-story concrete core, a new approach to commercial construction at the time.

Construction concluded in the summer of 1965 at a final cost of $5 million. A two-day ceremonial opening was held on April 1st and 2nd, 1966 to much fanfare and thousands of attendees. Vice President Hubert Humphrey traveled to deliver the keynote address, escorted by North Carolina governor Dan K. Moore. Also in attendance were Deputy Ambassador to the U.N. James Nabrit, U.S. Secretary of Commerce John T. Connor, and U.S. Secretary of Housing and Urban Development Robert C. Weaver, the first African American appointed to a U.S. Cabinet-level position.

The architectural design and construction used were highly lauded for their cutting-edge methodology at the time. The building's progress was the featured cover story in the August 1964 issue of Construction Magazine due to the design's "innovation in building". In 1965, the building won first place in the Prestressed Concrete Institute's Awards Program, and was noted to be the tallest precast and post-tensioned office building in the United States. It was also named one of Forbes' ten outstanding buildings of 1966 and one of Fortune's top ten buildings of the decade.

=== Concrete reinforcement ===
The building originally featured a concrete exterior with ribbon windows, exposed concrete columns, concrete spandrel panels, and concrete fins. As part of the bold design, each floor was designed to be cantilevered from the concrete core so that the corners of the building could extend outward with a glass facade. Unfortunately, the weight of the concrete led the floors of the structure to sag over time. This required retrofitting each corner with structural concrete to support the structure, which extended those concrete beams to the ground level. The loss of the cantilevered floors and heaviness of the concrete lattice resulted in a quasi-brutalist style to the building.

== 21st century ==
The company sold the building in 2006 to Greenfire Real Estate Holdings, which is led by Michael Lemanski, for $10.5 million. After the sale, Greenfire redeveloped the building and changed the name to Legacy Tower. Lemanski led a diverse group of mostly local investors which bought the building in 2017. In 2017, Lemanski led another $11 million renovation of the property through his firm New South Ventures.

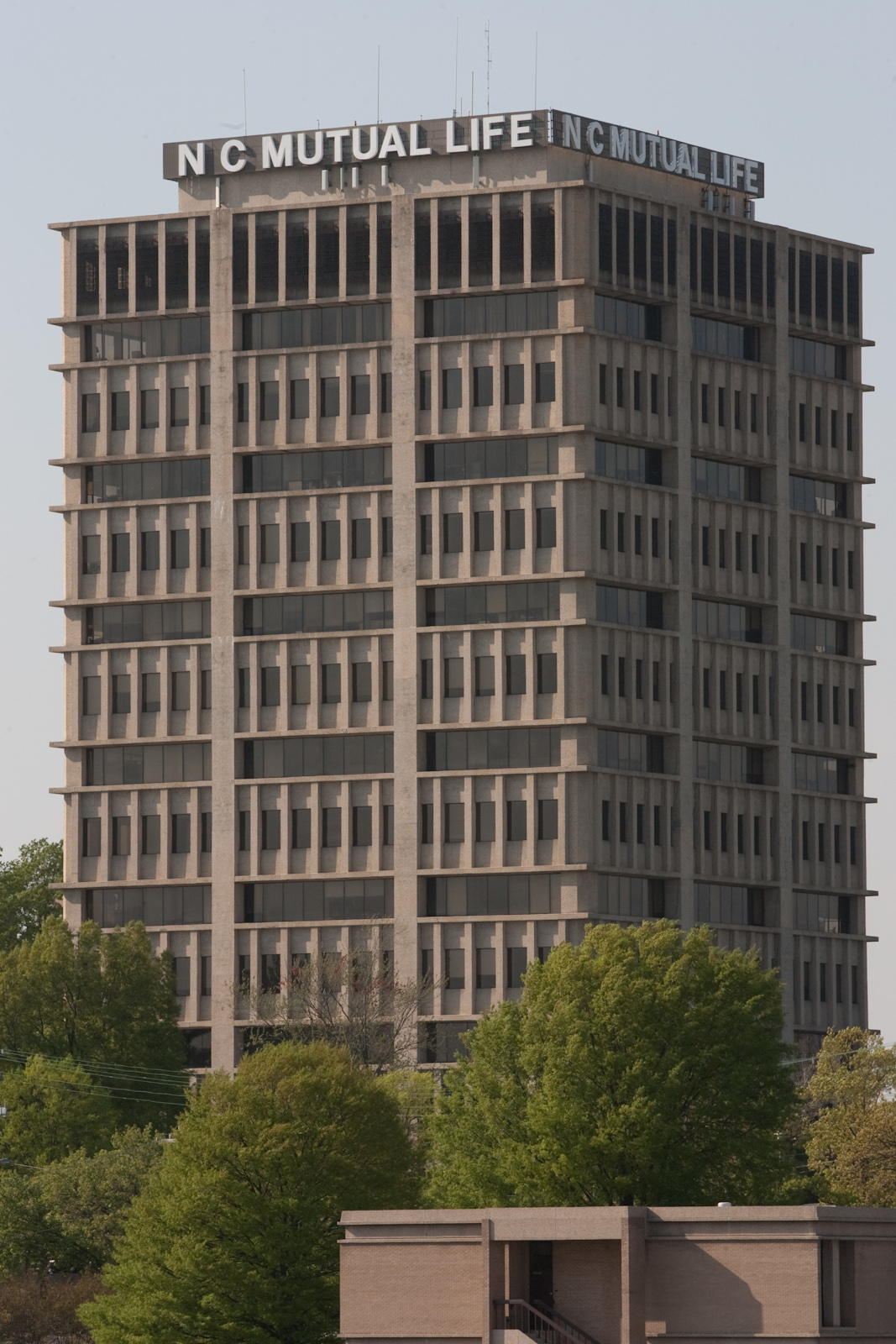
Tower at Mutual Plaza as it appeared in 2010

N.C. Mutual financially struggled in later years and eventually reduced their office space in the building from six stories to one. The company ceased writing new business in 2016 and was eventually liquidated in 2022.

In October 2020, Turnbridge Equities bought the building for $37.2 million in a foreclosure auction from 411 West Street Chapel Hill LLC.

Turnbridge announced $10 million in renovations, with both interior and exterior work, to what it now calls Mutual Tower. Durham's Historic Preservation Commission approved a "breathable" elastomeric coating to prevent deterioration in 2023 with the added effect of brightening the building's tone. The words "N.C. Mutual Life" were removed from two of the building's sides as part of the renovation.

As of 2026, the building houses tenants including the administrative offices of Duke University, the Department of Veterans Affairs, architectural firm Perkins&Will, and Legal Aid of North Carolina. Building amenities include co-working spaces, a lobby coffee shop, cafe, and cocktail bar, and a fitness center.

== See also ==
- Black Wall Street (Durham, North Carolina)
- Urban renewal
- Modern architecture
