= Lyda Moore Merrick =

Journal founder, editor

- Born: Lyda Vivian Moore; November 19, 1890; Hayti, Durham, North Carolina
- Died: February 14, 1987 (aged 96)
- Resting place: Beechwood Cemetery (Durham, North Carolina)
- Education: Fisk University
- Known for: magazine founder and editor
- Notable work: The Merrick/Washington Magazine for the Blind
- Father: Aaron McDuffie Moore

Lyda Moore Merrick (November 19, 1890- February 14, 1987) was an American writer, editor, and activist. She was an advocate for blind people and the founder of The Merrick/Washington Magazine for the Blind, a national publication addressing the needs of black people with visual impairments.

== Early life ==
Lyda Vivian Moore was born on November 19, 1890, in her family's home in Durham, North Carolina in the Hayti neighborhood. She was born into a prominent black family in North Carolina to Sarah McCotta "Cottie" S. Moore (née Dancy) and Aaron McDuffie Moore. A.M. Moore was a founder of the North Carolina Mutual and Provident Association, one of the oldest black-owned businesses in the United States, and Cottie Moore was a niece of prominent Black Republican John C. Dancy. Lyda was the elder of two daughters.

Moore attended Whitted School in Durham through the ninth grade, graduating as valedictorian. She then attended the Scotia Seminary, a Freedmen's school. At eighteen, she matriculated at Fisk University, where she graduated magna cum laude in 1911 with a degree in music. Moore then attended Columbia University, studying art.

In 1916, Moore married Ed Merrick, son of John Merrick, joining the two prominent families in what a local newspaper called "a social event of state-wide importance." Their wedding was attended by W. E. B. Du Bois and Charlotte Hawkins Brown, and many prominent community members. They had two daughters.

== Career and community roles ==
Merrick was very involved in her community. In August 1933, she sat on a six-member committee, including Charles Clinton Spaulding, and Louis Austin lobbied the all-white Durham school board on behalf of Black school needs.

Merrick became the board chair for the Durham Colored Library, Inc. in 1949. She also sat on the Lincoln Hospital Board of Trustees.

Merrick was an accomplished portraitist. Several of her works are displayed in buildings named for their subjects. She was also a pianist. She gave private piano lessons and played the organ at St. Joseph's African Methodist Episcopal Church.

Merrick was friends with Madie Hall Xuma. Their friendship linked the Durham Black community with South African community, joining them in against Jim Crow and apartheid. Merrick raised money in Durham to support Xuma's work in South Africa.

=== Creation of The Merrick/Washington Magazine for the Blind ===
In 1922 the Moore family temporarily took care of a baby, John Carter Washington. Washington had been born without eyes and "ears that barely worked." In 1949, Merrick created a library club and resource center at the Durham Colored Library, the Corner for the Blind. The program was successful, and membership grew. However, the Stanford Warren Library did not have sufficient materials for the blind of interest to the Black community. Merrick and Washington founded The Negro Braille Magazine in 1952. This publication was the first to cater to the needs and interests of blind African Americans. The magazine included excerpts from leading Black periodicals, selected by Merrick, translated into Braille. The magazine was published by the Durham Colored Library, Inc. (now the Stanford Warren Library), which had been founded by her father. She served as its editor for eighteen years. During this time, she also endeavored to find funding for the magazine, often taking on the expense herself rather than charging a subscription fee from the often in-need readers. At its height, the magazine reached international circulation. When Merrick stepped down as its editor in 1971, the Stanford Warren Library trustees took it over, publishing it semi-annually. Around 1980, the periodical was renamed The Merrick/Washington Magazine for the Blind.

=== Death and burial ===
Merrick died on February 14, 1987. She is buried with the Moore family at the Beechwood Cemetery.

== Awards and legacy ==
- The Hayti Heritage Center contains the Lyda Moore Merrick gallery featuring African American artists.
- 1969: Artra Achievement Award
- 1969: Links, Inc., of Durham
- 1970: Honorary membership in Delta Sigma Theta
- 1977: Honorary membership in the North Carolina Library Association
- 1977: Daughters of Dorcas and Sons Quilting Guild Plaque: the Negro Braille Magazine Plaque
- 1979: Mother of the Year, Durham area Merchant's Association
- 1981: Bahai Community of Durham Humanitarian Award
- 1982: Community Recognition Award, Daughters of Isis of Zafa Court No. 41
