= Black Wall Street (Durham, North Carolina) =

Hub of African-American business in Durham, North Carolina

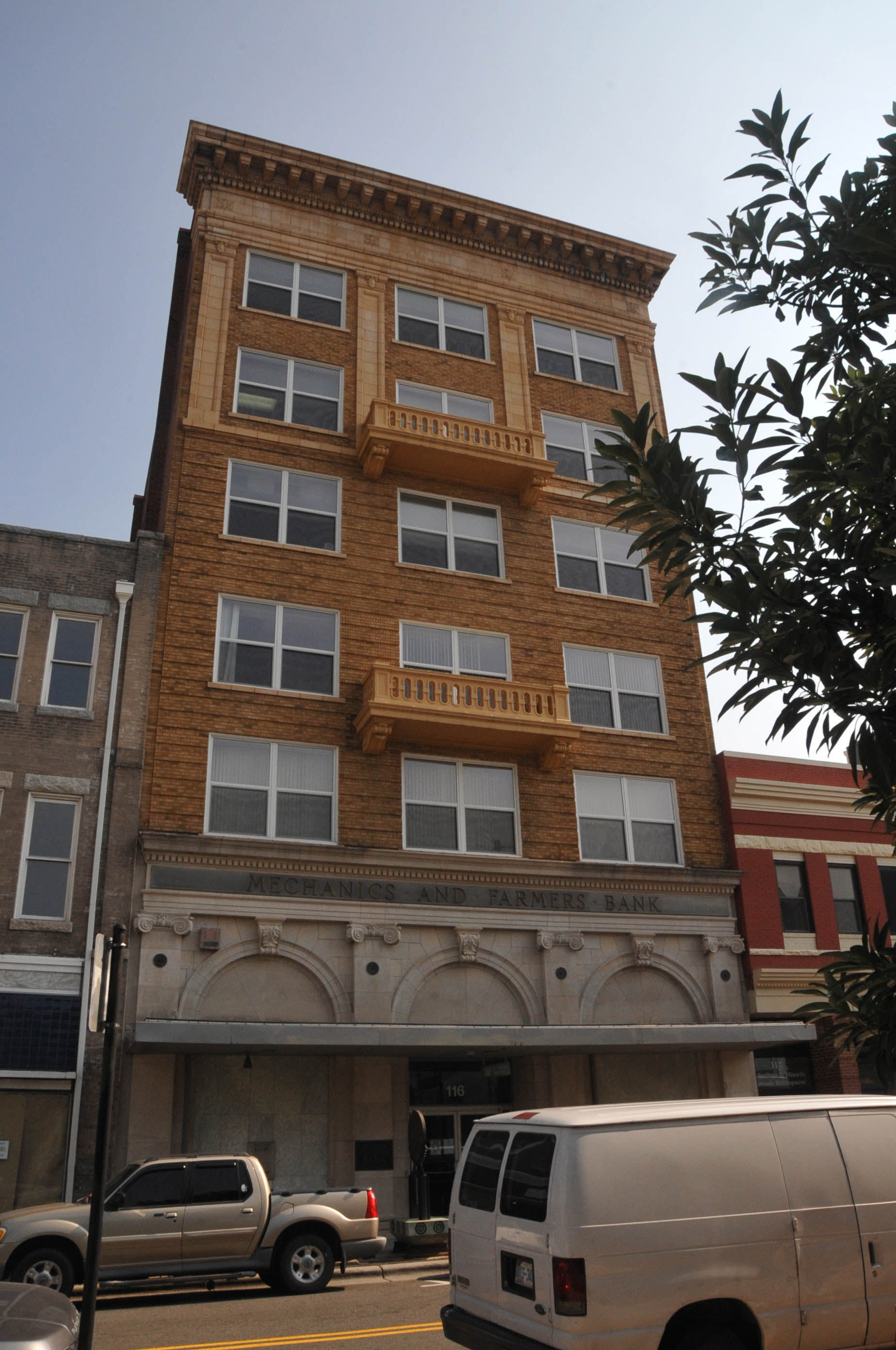
Former North Carolina Mutual Life Insurance Company and Mechanics and Farmers Bank building

Black Wall Street was the hub of African-American businesses and financial services in Durham, North Carolina, during the late 1800s and early 1900s. It is located on Parrish Street. It was home to Mechanics and Farmers Bank and North Carolina Mutual.

== History ==
During a time period when disenfranchising Black people and openly violating their rights was common, the Black populations of Durham were making strides in business that challenged the legitimacy of White supremacy. Black-owned business in Durham can be traced back to the efforts of two African-American entrepreneurs: John Merrick and Charles Spaulding. This duo provided the leadership and initiative necessary for the beginnings of Black Wall Street.

Though able to increase African-American wealth, Black Wall Street did not distribute this new-found wealth equally within Durham's Black community, Hayti. The region also promoted basic social restructuring for Black people, but did not contribute to desegregation efforts.

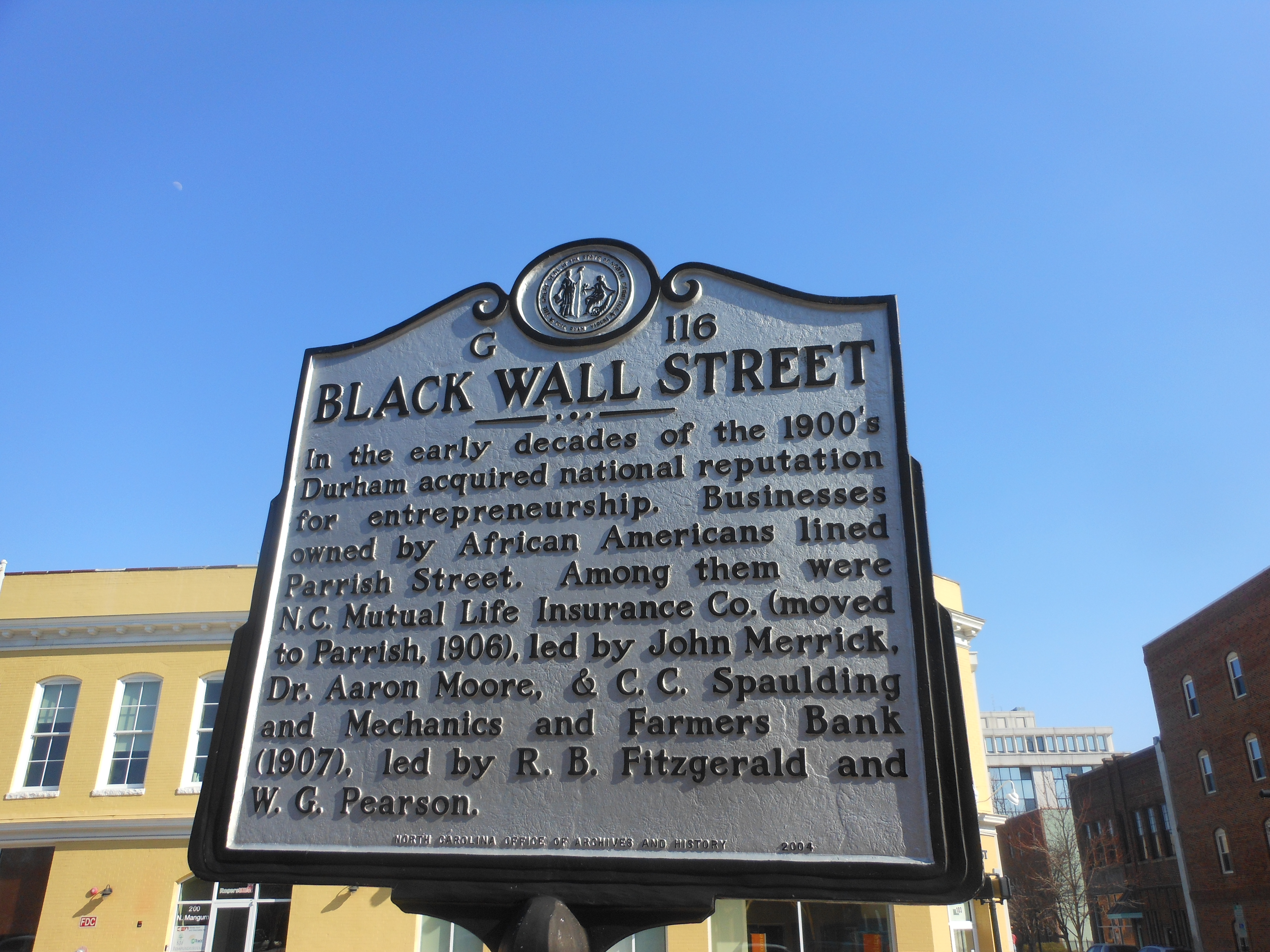
Memorial sign of Black Wall Street in Durham Downtown

=== Historical context ===
The southern United States were left in tumult in the few decades of Reconstruction following the Civil War. During the late 1800s, most of these southern regions were rebuilding infrastructure damaged by war. Racial tensions were at an all-time high, due to the recent emancipation of all enslaved Black people in the United States, and the new economic and social competition they represented in many white people's eyes. But though these formerly-enslaved individuals had been freed, their quality of life saw little improvement. Estimates from government officials say almost 85% of Black people were living below the poverty line during the late 1800s. Automatically placed at the bottom of the social ladder, Black people were denied virtually all rights afforded to white people.

== Major figures ==
Merrick was able to reach prominence in his community through his longstanding friendship with Washington Duke. Originally a barber by profession, Merrick gained enough money through income and loans to open North Carolina Mutual Life Insurance, which was later expanded with the efforts of Charles Spaulding.

In 1900, when Spaulding became general manager, NC Mutual was on the brink of failure. By 1910, the company was titled as "the world's largest Negro business." Spaulding and two of the original founders, John Merrick and Dr. Aaron M. Moore (Spaulding's uncle), were heralded in the Afro-American community as the "Triumvirate," the epitome of Booker T. Washington's "black captains of industry." By channeling their success to providing employment for fellow African Americans, these pioneering figures of Black Wall Street stimulated its economic expansion.

=== Location ===
Black Wall Street was a four-block district on Parrish Street nicknamed in reference to the district of New York City. Although the term "Black Wall Street" did not become prevalent until the late fifties, its identity as an economic powerhouse for Black Americans was apparent since the late 1800s. Numerous other cities in the south had similar Black economic centers, including Tulsa. Parrish Street, in downtown Durham, was very close to the Hayti community, Durham's main African-American residential region. The two areas together served as the center of Black life in Durham.

== Emergence ==
Clashes between White and Black communities throughout the south during this time period were practically routine occurrences, but this was generally not the case in Durham. In his visit to Durham, Booker T. Washington said: "Of all the southern cities I have visited I found here the sanest attitude of the white people toward the blacks."

== Relationship with White population ==
The progress of the Black business sphere was directly linked to the tolerance and helpfulness of certain elite Whites in the area, namely Julian Carr, Washington Duke, and James Duke. This key factor is what differentiated Durham's racial community from a number of other prominent southern cities. This help from the White populace came in two forms: direct capital investment and racial tolerance. That said, Julian Carr was a known White supremacist who encouraged violence against Black people, supporting the Wilmington massacre of 1898.

The first form, investment, was the key reason as to how Black Wall Street came to be. Merrick's original insurance company was partially funded by his long standing friend Washington Duke and White capitalist, Julian Carr. At the time, these ventures were recorded as the largest investment by a White man in a Black enterprise. White bankers even aided in the organization of the first Negro bank. By bridging the gap between post-Civil War to current African Americans, White industrialists paved a path for Blacks to continue expanding Black Wall Street.

=== Duke family ===
The Duke family was actively involved in funding a number of the enterprises on Black Wall Street. Seen as the quintessential southern businessmen, the Dukes were a highly revered family who made a fortune from establishing Durham as the tobacco capital of the world. Often cited as one of the key advantages for Durham's Black business sphere, the positive relationship between this White elite family and Black entrepreneurs allowed direct capital to flow from the White economic sphere to the African-American sphere. This openly positive attitude towards the Black community stemmed from Washington Duke's original opposition to slavery during the Civil War. Frequently characterized by local historians, as “philanthropic, accommodating, and welcoming," Washington Duke believed that economic progress should not be marred by skin color. Often found directly giving personal advice to Merrick and Spaulding, the Dukes did not isolate themselves from the Black half of the city unlike other contemporary industrial moguls. James B. Duke once stated about the status of Durham:

Durham, as a city, must be holistically judged for its economic merit. This means we musn't let our colored neighbors fall into economic depression.

It was also evident that the level of business on Black Wall Street was insignificant in comparison to the Duke Tobacco industry. Therefore, the Dukes saw the aid to Black Wall Street as no threat to their industrial dominance of Durham.

=== Tension with White middle and working classes ===
Though racial tolerance and direct capital investment were prevalent amongst the highest ranking White people of Durham, the typical White citizen exhibited the stereotypical distaste for African Americans and provided little help in the progression of Black Wall Street. Labor working White people saw the increased employment of Black workers as a threat to their own job security. The Dukes tripled Black employment in their tobacco factories during the turn of the century, which angered a number of White workers who occasionally were even seen protesting against this increase in Black employment. Though both Booker T. Washington and W. E. B. DuBois said that Durham's White population was highly tolerant, this was not always the case. Envious of the rapid economic development, lower-class Whites occasionally attacked stores on Black Wall Street. The most famous of these attacks was cited on March 2, 1902, when a group of White people burned down an office owned by North Carolina Mutual.

Black people in southern communities including Durham did not see independent business as a solution to rising in the ranks of the social hierarchy. However, a few Black locals in Durham took the route of free enterprise instead of manual labor. This deterministic attitude was partially due to the strong leadership of the community under John Merrick. He once addressed the Hayti region, "I do think we [Black community] have done well and I think we could have done better. Now let us make better use of the years we have left, as we have the past to look back over and see mistakes." The positivity in terms of leadership allowed Black Wall Street to surpass most expectations.

=== Mechanics and Farmers Bank ===
Few options were available for Blacks to safely place money deposits and earn interest, considering Whites often barred Blacks from using their banks. Taking the initiative to solve this predicament, the founders of M&F Bank, Richard Fitzgerald and James Shepard, established the first African-American bank. M&F Bank grew to be more than simply a depository for African-American wealth, but became a major source of loans for Blacks. M&F allowed Black Wall Street to become self-reliant in terms of funding and allowed for a direct increase in the number of institutions and organizations. Within twenty years of the bank's founding in 1907, the number of Black-owned businesses in Durham tripled and the bank itself has been a profitable institution every year since its opening, even during the depressions.

== Economic growth ==
The area saw a steady increase of population, wealth, and diversity of occupation. By 1890 the number of colored people in Durham was 1,858 or 33.8% of the total population. The year 1910 exhibited an increase of over 200% in the total population and the African-American population was approximately 38% of the total. It is clear that Whites were not impeding the development of this population, in light of their own endeavors. The numbers based on wealth were even more staggering. The total valuation of Black property in the county was $8,696 in 1890. By 1920, this valuation skyrocketed to an astounding $4,298,067. Even after accounting for inflation, the level of growth for Black Wall Street was incredible. Booker T. Washington, mentioned in his commentary of Durham the level of vocational diversity. He wrote that he had "never seen in a city of this size so many prosperous blacksmiths, wheelwrights, cotton-mill operatives, and tobacco factory owners among the Negros." It is important to acknowledge the fact that these aforementioned statistics reflect gross numbers, and realistically much of the wealth was shared among a select few Black business elite, not the entire population. Most Blacks in Durham, due to financial limitations, were still working in the Duke Tobacco factories or as agricultural laborers after emancipation. The few that were able to enter business had personal connections such as in the case of Merrick. Even within the business owners' sector of the Black population, few reached the economic status of Merrick, Spaulding, or Fitzgerald. A majority of African-American business owners realistically operated small stores specialized in certain goods that frequently did not result in huge successes. In an official business census in 1905, it was estimated that over 75% of revenue from Black Wall Street came from North Carolina Mutual and M&F Bank. Therefore, Durham represented a unique setting for its select few Black business owners, but this was not the case for the average African American.

== Social strata ==
Black Wall Street had a considerable effect on social progression. During the late 1800s the first Jim Crow laws were established, which mandated racial segregation in all public facilities in Southern United States. By 1890 the "separate but equal" clause had become quite common throughout the south. Black Wall Street indirectly maintained this concept.

Black social strata in Durham was shifting rapidly during the late 1800s. The self-made African-American businessman yielded high status and "suffered little condescension" from the older, White-oriented business class. By the start of the 1900s increasing segregation and urbanization encouraged the rise of a Black business class. This threatened to reorder the African-American status system that had been determined by antebellum forces. Fortunately for Durham, the lack of an entrenched antebellum social order, allowed this social change to come about with little upheaval. Higher-ranking Blacks like Merrick were considered upper-class and "new rich."

However, as previously mentioned, this social change did not involve the desegregation of White and Black citizens. Instead two distinct social structures were apparent due to the presence of Black Wall Street. The presence of an expanding urban area that offered industrial opportunity allowed for the formation of a Black middle class. The only true interaction that occurred between the two distinct social hierarchies occurred at the highest ranks, such as in the case of Merrick with the Dukes and Julian Carr.

== Legacy ==
By the end of World War II, the success of African-American businesses gave Durham the title as "Capital of the Black Middle Class." However, the 1960s urban renewal removed much of Hayti and Durham's Black Wall Street. This urban sprawl coupled with a heated Civil Rights movements from the 1940s to 1970s began the first real desegregation of Black and White business districts. By the late 1900s the Census Bureau reported the city's population as 39.8% Black and 59.8% White. North Carolina Mutual remained the largest and oldest African-American life insurance company. The legacy of these original businesses is still prevalent in current Durham institutions. Durham's downtown, once neglected, is quickly becoming the city's most popular destination. Today, historic Parrish Street, is at the center of downtown revitalization. The Parrish Street Project was recently formed as an initiative of the City of Durham to honor the history of Black Wall Street and spur economic revitalization along a central downtown corridor.

== See also ==
- Black mecca
