= Old North Carolina Mutual Life Insurance Company Building =

- North Carolina Mutual Life Insurance Company Building
- U.S. National Register of Historic Places
- U.S. National Historic Landmark
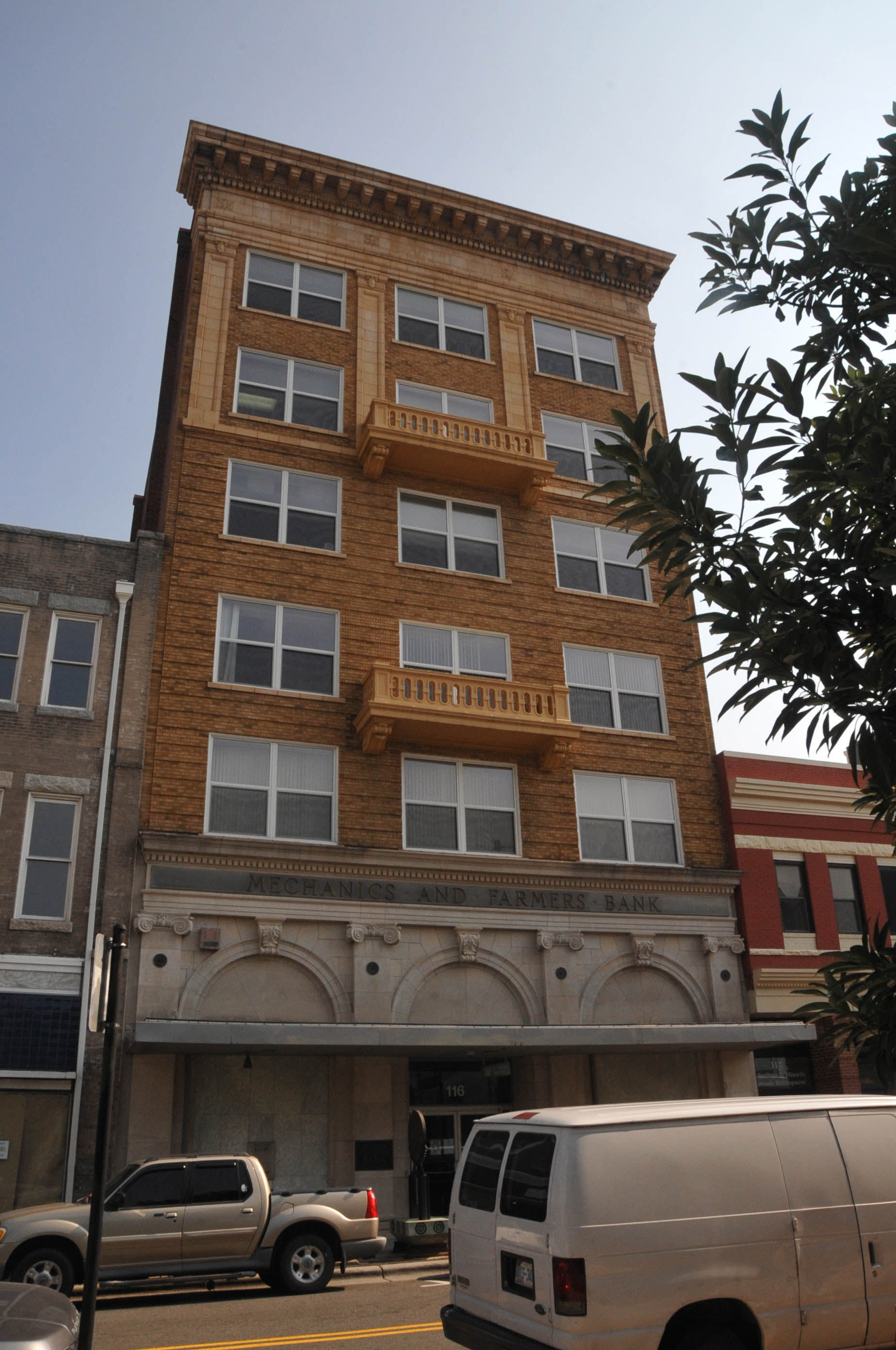

- Location within North Carolina Location within the United States
- Interactive map showing the North Carolina Mutual Life Insurance Building’s location
- Location: 114-116 W. Parrish St., Durham, North Carolina
- Coordinates: 35°59′45.4″N 78°54′2.8″W
- Built: 1921
- Architect: Calvin E. Lightner
- NRHP reference No.: 75001258

Significant dates
- Added to NRHP: May 15, 1975
- Designated NHL: May 15, 1975

The Old North Carolina Mutual Life Insurance Company Building, also known as the Mechanics and Farmers Bank Building, is an office building at 114-116 West Parrish Street in downtown Durham, North Carolina. It formerly served as the headquarters for the North Carolina Mutual Life Insurance Company, which was formerly one of the nation's largest companies founded and owned by African-Americans. The building was declared a National Historic Landmark in 1975.

== Description and history ==
The former North Carolina Mutual Life Insurance Company building is located in downtown Durham, on the northside of West Parrish Street in the area known as Black Wall Street. It is a six-story brick building, three bays wide, with a flat roof. The ground floor bays are sheltered by a marquee that extends over the sidewalk, with plate glass windows in the outer bays and the main entrance recessed in the center bay. Above the marquee there are blind arches that form an arcade between the first and second floors. Pilasters rise between and outside the first floor bays to a stone course in which the words "Merchants and Farmers Bank" are incised. The five floors above have paired sash windows in each bay; the bays of the upper two floors are articulated by paneled pilasters. There are two balustraded concrete balconies projecting from the center bays of the third and fifth floors.

The North Carolina Mutual Life Insurance Company was founded in 1898 by a group of seven African-American men, of whom two, John Merrick and Dr. Aaron Moore, survived in the business after one year. Moore's nephew, Charles Clinton Spaulding, took charge of the business in 1900, and it thereafter grew rapidly, becoming by 1910 the nation's largest firm owned by African-Americans. The company had this building constructed in 1921 as its second headquarters. At that time, it was the second-tallest building in Durham, and described by Durham's Morning Herald as an "architectural gem". It was designed by Calvin E. Lightner. The first floor of the building housed the operations of the Mechanics and Farmers Bank.

== See also ==
- List of National Historic Landmarks in North Carolina
- National Register of Historic Places listings in Durham County, North Carolina
