= John Hervey Wheeler =

American banker, attorney and civil rights leader

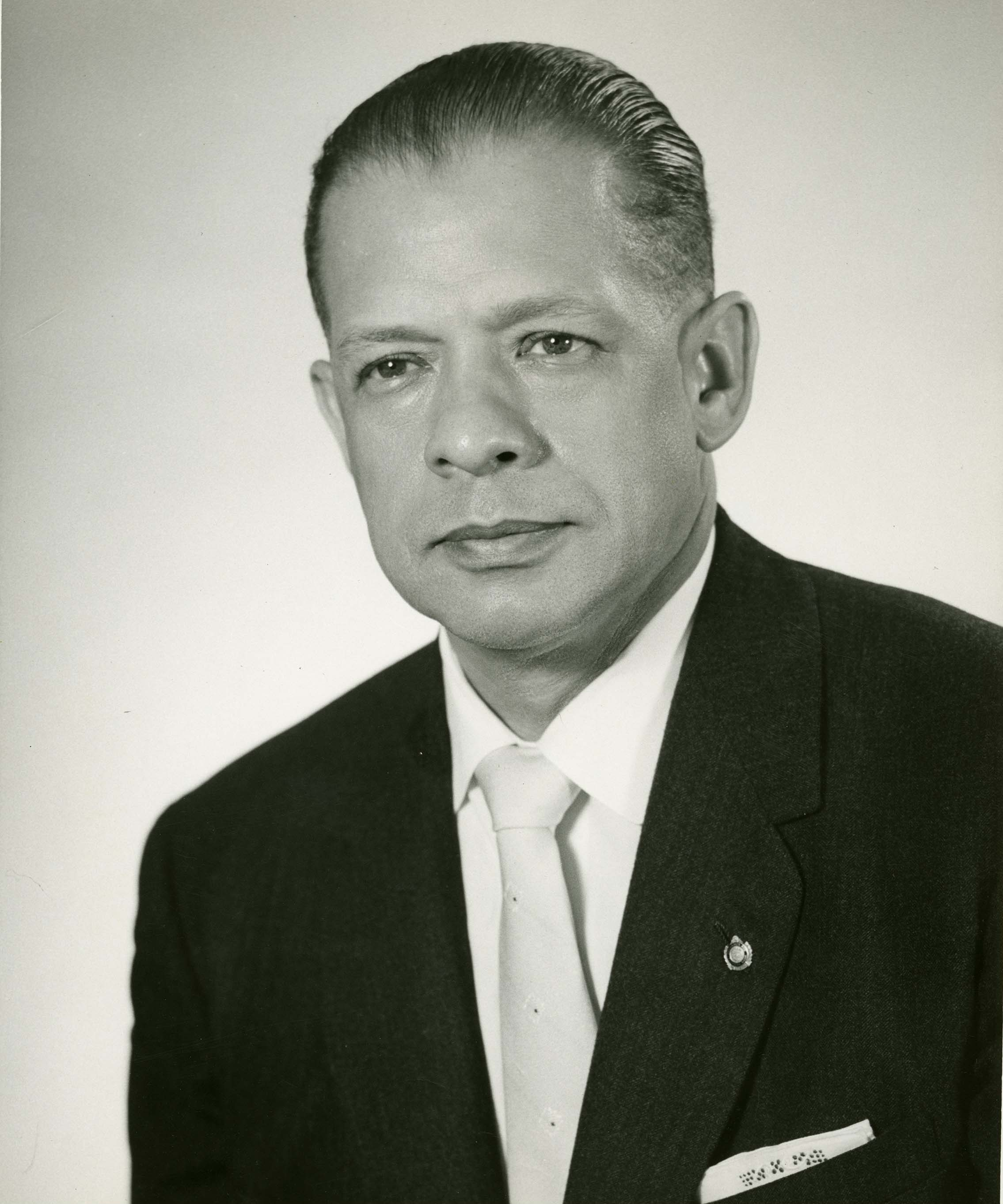
- Born: January 1, 1908; Kittrell, North Carolina, U.S.
- Died: July 6, 1978 (aged 70); Boston, Massachusetts, U.S.
- Occupations: Banker, political activist, philanthropist
- Spouse: Selena Warren Wheeler
- Children: Warren Hervey Wheeler; Julia Wheeler
- Relatives: Ruth W. Lowe (sister)

John Hervey Wheeler (January 1, 1908 – July 6, 1978) was an American bank president, businessman, civil rights leader, and educator based in North Carolina. Throughout his life, Wheeler was recognized for his accomplishments by various institutions across the country. John H. Wheeler started as a bank teller at Mechanics and Farmers Bank, and worked his way up to become the bank's president in 1952. In the 1960s, Wheeler became increasingly active in United States politics, carrying several White House positions appointed by Presidents John F. Kennedy, Richard Nixon, and Lyndon B. Johnson.

== Personal life ==
John H. Wheeler was born on the campus of Kittrell College in 1908, to John Leonidas and Margaret Hervey Wheeler. In 1935, he married Selena Warren Wheeler and they subsequently had two children, Warren and Julia. Wheeler died in 1978. The federal courthouse in Durham, North Carolina was renamed the "John Hervey Wheeler United States Courthouse" in recognition of his achievements.

== Education and banking career ==
John H. Wheeler began his academic career at Morehouse College in 1925. He graduated summa cum laude with a Bachelor of Arts degree in 1929. In 1947, Wheeler graduated from the law school at the North Carolina College at Durham (now North Carolina Central University). He was also an active member of Omega Psi Phi fraternity, Beta Phi chapter. Beginning as a teller at the Mechanics and Farmers Bank in 1929, he rose to become president of the bank in 1952.

== Activism ==
The activism and leadership of John H. Wheeler thrived in the 1950s and 1960s. He was heavily involved in politics and education through various positions within the federal government and on various boards of trustees for institutions like Morehouse College, Atlanta University, Lincoln Hospital, and the National Scholarship Service for Negro Students. While serving two presidents, Wheeler devoted his time to the development of low-income housing, focused on race relations, and the elimination of poverty. He had working relationships with a number of United States presidents, John F. Kennedy, Richard Nixon, and Lyndon B. Johnson, who invited him to assist in drafting the Civil Rights Act of 1964. In 1956, John H. Wheeler was also the first African-American to bring an integration suit in the state of North Carolina.

=== United Negro College Fund (UNCF) ===
John H. Wheeler was an active member of the United Negro College Fund, where he attended several meetings and convocations for decades. In March 1966 at the UNCF Role of Business Convocation, Wheeler delivered a powerful speech concerning the need for more training and opportunities for African-American scholars. Through UNCF, Wheeler was able to advocate for the need of higher educational opportunities for the black community.

== Leadership positions ==
- 1952–1978: President of Mechanics and Farmers Bank in Durham, North Carolina
- 1961-1965: President John F. Kennedy's Committee for Equal Employment Opportunity and Urban Housing
- 1963-1968: President of the Southern Regional Council
- 1964: First black delegate in North Carolina to the National Convention of the Democratic Party
- 1965-1967: President Lyndon B. Johnson's National Advisory Commission on Food and Fiber

== Honorary degrees ==
- 1954: Doctor of Laws from Shaw University, (Raleigh, NC)
- 1962: Doctor of Humanities from Tuskegee Institute, (Tuskegee, AL)
- 1963: Doctor of Laws from Johnson L. Smith University, (Charlotte, NC)
- 1967: Doctor of Humanities from Morehouse College, (Atlanta, GA)
- 1970: Doctor of Humanities from Duke University, (Durham, NC)
- 1971: Doctor of Humanities from North Carolina Central University, (Durham, NC)

== Other sources ==
- John H. Wheeler Collection. Archives and Special Collections. Robert W. Woodruff Library at Atlanta University Center.
- Winford, Brandon. John Hervey Wheeler, Black Banking, and the Economic Struggle for Civil Rights. Lexington: University Press of Kentucky, 2019.
