= William Gaston Pearson =

American educator and businessman

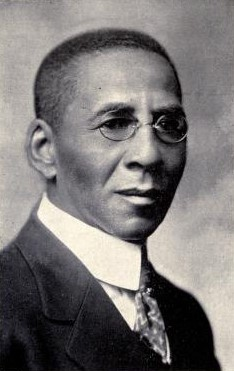
Pearson c. 1919

William Gaston Pearson (1858–1947) was an American educator and businessman in North Carolina.

== Biography ==
Pearson was born a slave in Durham County on April 11, 1859, to Cynthia Anne Pearson (née Barbee) and George Washington Pearson Sr. After he was freed, he worked at the Carr Factory where General Julian S. Carr, the owner, recognized his potential and financed his education at Shaw University. Pearson graduated from Shaw with a B.S. in 1886 and received an honorary M.A. in 1890. He was awarded Honorary Ph.D's from Kittrell College in 1915 and Wilberforce University in 1919. On June 6, 1893, Pearson married Minnie Sumner of Charlotte, a teacher.

In 1886, Pearson began his teaching career in Whitted High School, a small grade school in Durham and he succeeded James Whitted as principal of the school. He was a close friend of Dr. James E. Shepard, founder of what is now North Carolina Central University and aided Shepard in his efforts to develop the university.

Pearson became the first principal of the newly built Hillside Park High School on Umstead Street in 1922. In the 18 years during which Pearson held this position, many significant improvements were made at Hillside. The enrollment increase markedly and in 1923 the school was recognized as a standard high school by the state Department of Public Instruction. In 1931, Hillside was accredited by the Southern Association of Secondary School and Colleges. Pearson was a strict disciplinarian who improved the quality of education at Hillside by demanding dedication and excellence from teachers and students. He housed the teachers in two "teacherages" across the street from his home so he could oversee their activities. He would frequently sit in on classes and evaluate teaching techniques. He demanded course outline from each teacher at the beginning of each semester with progress reports at regular intervals during the academic year. At graduation time each year, Pearson traveled to Southern and Eastern Colleges to try to recruit the best teachers possible. Despite his stringent demands, "Profs" Pearson was well liked by students, faculty and community members. In a Principal Popularity Contest sponsored by the Carolina Times newspaper for black schools in Durham, Pearson came in third with an impressive showing of votes (each ticket sent in counted as 500 votes).

Pearson also made outstanding contributions as a member of the Durham community. He was one of the original organizers of the North Carolina Mutual Life Insurance Company, the Fraternal Bank and Trust Company, Southern Fidelity and Surety Company as well as Banker's Fire Insurance Company. He was a trustee of Kittrell College, St. Joseph's A.M.E. Church, the National Religious Training School, NCCU and Wilberforce University. He helped found the Mechanics and Farmers Bank in Durham's "Black Wall Street". In 1927, he received the Harmon Award for Achievement in Business.

== Legacy ==
The W. G. Pearson Gifted and Talented Elementary School, W. G. Pearson Magnet Middle School and the cafeteria at N.C. Central University were named after him.
