= Legacy Tower =

Legacy Tower may refer to:

- Legacy at Millennium Park, Chicago
- Legacy Tower (Purbachal, Dhaka), Bangladesh
- Legacy Tower (Rochester, New York)
- Legacy Tower at Miami Worldcenter, Miami, Florida
- The Tower at Mutual Plaza, formerly Legacy Tower, in Durham, North Carolina
