= North Carolina Mutual Building =

- U.S. National Register of Historic Places
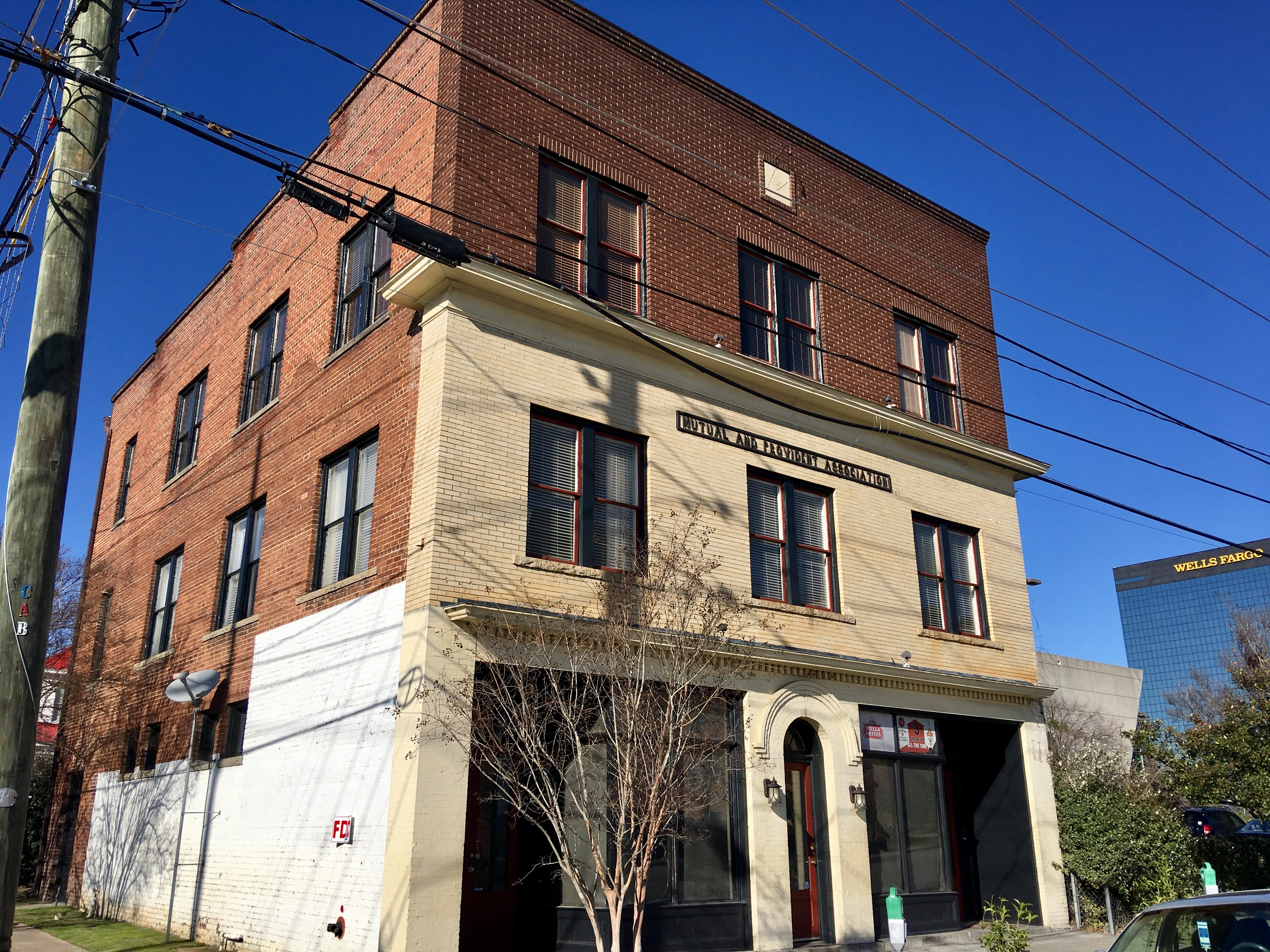

- Location within South Carolina Location within the United States
- Location: 1001, 1001 1/2 and 1003 Washington St., Columbia, South Carolina
- Coordinates: 34°0′10″N 81°2′17″W
- Area: less than one acre
- Built: 1909
- Architect: Perrin, Summerville M.
- NRHP reference No.: 94001570
- Added to NRHP: January 20, 1995

North Carolina Mutual Building, also known as the Blue Palace Tea Shop and Barber Shop, is a historic commercial building located at Columbia, South Carolina, United States. It was built in 1909 by the North Carolina Mutual Life Insurance Company, and is a three-story, rectangular, brick commercial block. The building housed African-American businesses, professionals, and institutions during the years of Jim Crow segregation. It is located in the Washington Street business district, the city's black downtown.

It was added to the National Register of Historic Places in 1995.
