= Richard B. Fitzgerald =

American businessman (1843–1918)

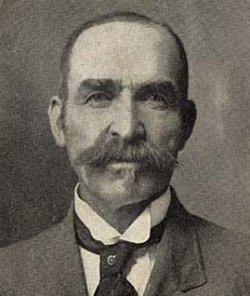
Richard B. Fitzgerald, circa 1912

Richard Burton Fitzgerald (c. 1843 – March 24, 1918) was an American brickmaker and business man who lived in Durham, North Carolina. After building his enterprise, he became president of the black-owned Mechanics and Farmers Bank in Durham, and was involved in other business ventures throughout North Carolina. He served as first president of Coleman Manufacturing Company, established in 1897 as the first cotton mill in the United States to be owned and operated by blacks. His bricks were used for major construction projects in the state's largest cities, including the capital.

Born free in New Castle County, Delaware to a white mother and mixed-race father freed from slavery, Fitzgerald and siblings moved with their family in 1855 to Chester County, Pennsylvania to reduce the risk of being taken by slave catchers and sold into slavery under the Fugitive Slave Act of 1850. After the Civil War, in which he served, Fitzgerald rejoined his family, who had moved to Hillsborough, North Carolina. There they set up a brickyard at their farm. He moved with a brother into Durham, building his business and becoming a major figure in the city's black community.

== Biography ==
=== Early life and Civil War civilian contractor service ===
Fitzgerald was born free about 1843 in New Castle County, Delaware, to Thomas and Sarah (Burton) Fitzgerald. His father Thomas was mulatto or mixed race, of African and Irish ancestry, and manumitted from slavery, likely by a white father and master. His mother was white and of English ancestry; she decided to raise her sons proudly within the community of free people of color, rather than "passing" as white, although they were of majority European ancestry. Growing up, Richard was described by his great-niece Pauli Murray as a "sturdy, rough and tumble fellow... who could work hard but cared more for good times" than he did for studying.

"Fiery, red-faced blond Richie had the same sharp blue eyes and shrewd trader's head as his mother. He was quick to drive a hard bargain and even quicker with his fists. His hot temper led him into many skirmishes and even as an old man he used to laugh and say, 'By golly, if I was dying and somebody made me mad, I'd stop dying long enough to fight about it.'"

At night, his more studious brother Robert would teach Richard and his siblings what Robert had learned in school that day, as both Richard and their brother William ("Billy") worked in their father's brickyard rather than attend the local Quaker school.

In 1855, the Fitzgerald family moved to a 25-acre (100,000 m^{2}) farm near Hinsonville in Chester County, Pennsylvania. They wanted to reduce the risk to their children of being kidnapped by slave catchers and sold into slavery. The catchers were active after bounties were offered under the Fugitive Slave Act of 1850.

At the beginning of the American Civil War, Fitzgerald joined the Quartermaster Department as a civilian contractor in Philadelphia, as blacks were not yet allowed to serve in the military. In 1862, he was transferred to the Army of the Potomac's Washington supply base, where he drove mules for the Union army, spending most of 1862 at Harrison's Landing and the Fort Monroe area. The United States Colored Troops were founded in 1863. Fitzgerald "went to sea" later in the war, likely as a merchant seaman.

== Postwar career ==
In late 1869, Fitzgerald and his brother Billy joined their family on a farm east of Hillsborough, North Carolina, where they had settled after moving from Pennsylvania and purchasing the land. The brothers set up a brickyard at the family farm, aided by their father and their brother Robert. However, a financial crisis was gripping the country and locally a bad drought was occurring. The Fitzgerald brick business had produced 40,000 bricks, but had no buyers. The brothers made several trips to Raleigh to try to sell their bricks, but to no avail. Billy returned to Pennsylvania within a few months of arriving in North Carolina.

Fitzgerald also became disheartened by the local business prospects, and returned to Pennsylvania. His brother Robert, however, had secured an order for 4,000 bricks for state railroad improvements. Robert also obtained a contract to make 4,000,000 bricks for construction of the new state penitentiary in Raleigh, and wrote Richard and Billy about the contracts, persuading them to return to North Carolina.

They began the contracts in the spring of 1870, hiring a crew to assist with production. They soon traveled to Raleigh and began setting up the brick production site. However, a flash flood destroyed several thousand bricks, and Billy departed again for Pennsylvania. Richard and Robert salvaged some of the bricks, and produced 525,000 more, for which they were paid eighty-five cents per thousand. After paying off their business debts and their laborers, they came away with a net profit of $83.10 for four months' work.

=== Marriage and family ===
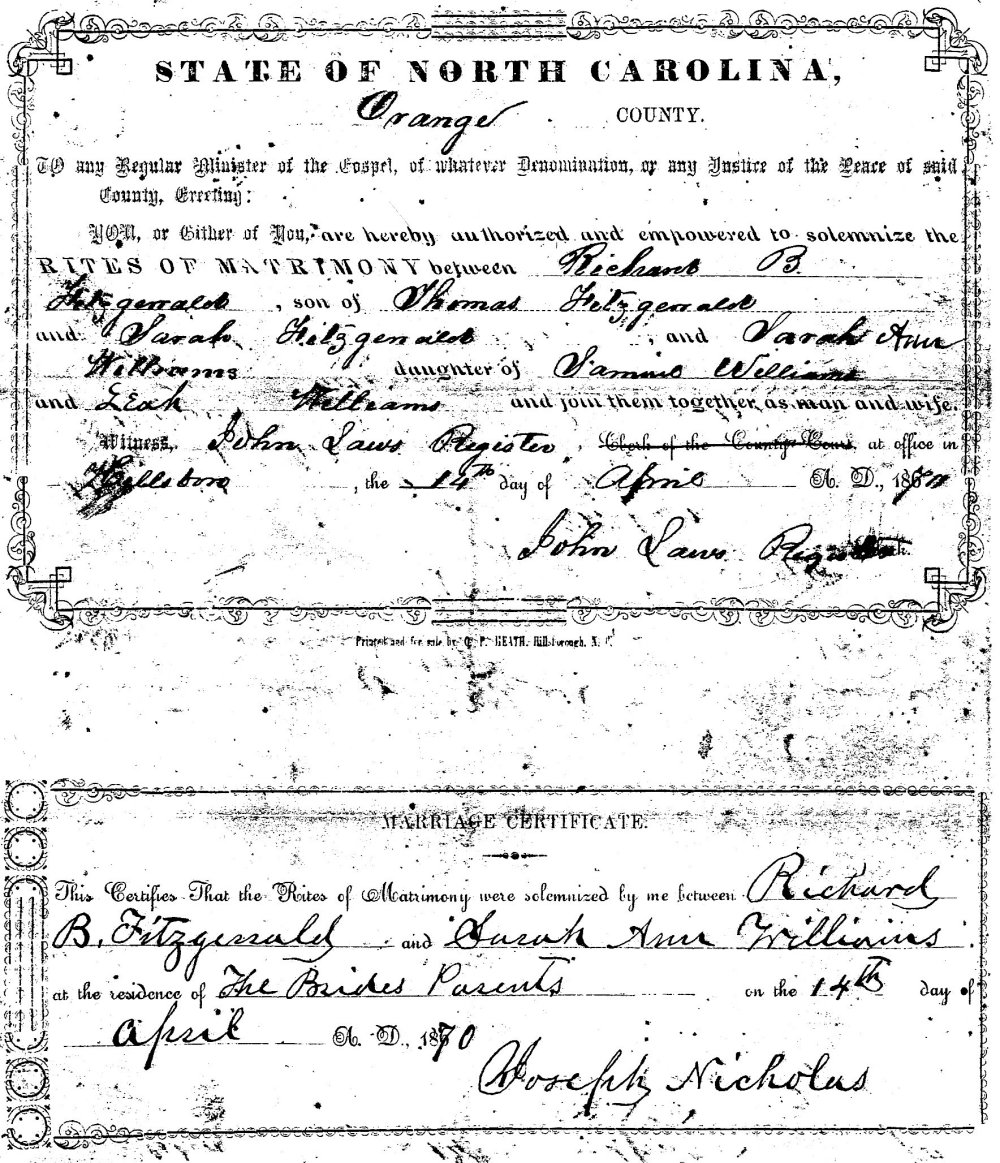
Marriage license for Richard B. Fitzgerald and Sarah Ann Williams, April 4, 1870

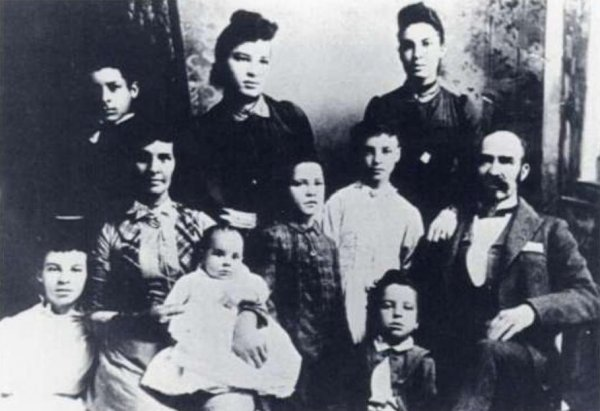
The Richard B. Fitzgerald family, circa 1900

On April 4, 1870, Richard married Sarah ("Sallie") Ann Williams at her parents' house. They had at least 12 children together; their sons were Charles (born 1876), Samuel (born 1883), Richard (1882–1886), Burton ("Burke"; 1887–1916), and William (1892–1927); and daughters were Lilly (born ca. 1873), Sarah (born 1874), Leer (born ca. 1878), Susan (born ca. 1880), Beatrice (born 1880), Alma (1893-1941), and Irene (born 1896). Sons Burke and Samuel followed their father into brickmaking; Samuel continued the family business after his father's death.

=== Move to Durham and expansion ===
Several years later, with his brother Robert, in 1879 Fitzgerald moved his own family to Durham, based on potentially favorable financial prospects within the developing tobacco manufacturing economy. "In Durham Richard Fitzgerald bought a large tract with a good vein of clay for brick in the vicinity of later Gattis and Wilkerson streets... here he began a brickyard and built an eighteen-room house shaded by a grove of maples and magnolias".

According to his grandniece Pauli Murray, "Within the next fifteen years Uncle Richard became Durham's leading brick maker. By 1884, he had a large brickyard on Chapel Hill Road and orders on hand for two million bricks". His brick company was located at the corner of Fitzgerald Street and Chapel Hill Road, and later Wilkerson and Gattis streets (which may be the same location, but the street names changed).

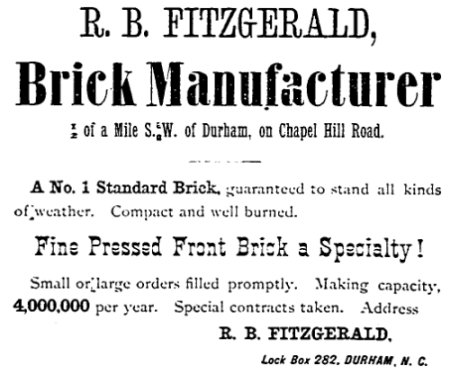
1886 ad for R. B. Fitzgerald's brick manufactory

Tobacco manufacturer William T. Blackwell told Fitzgerald that he would purchase all the brick he made. By 1910 Fitzgerald was producing "30,000 brick a day from his $17,000 plant, but owns besides 100 acres (0.40 km^{2}) of land within the city limits and has $50,000 worth of real estate." W.T. Bost, the city editor of the Durham Herald, said that Fitzgerald "makes better brick than any other man in town; therefore the people buy Fitzgerald's brick".

Thirty years of brickmaking (i.e. prior to 1913) had "netted Fitzgerald a big brickyard with a $6000 cement dryer, which makes it possible to turn out brick at all seasons; a yard whose capacity is 30,000 bricks per day, and whose value, including ten acres of land, is $17,000." His holdings in 1913 were valued conservatively at $100,000. "Turning his profits into real estate, he has... invested $1500 in a lot and five years later sold the property for $6000; he bought forty acres of farm land for $800, made brick on it for ten years and then sold it for $3000".

Besides brickmaking, Fitzgerald was involved in many other business ventures. In 1885, he purchased newspaper printing equipment to start a newspaper for the African-American community in Durham; no known editions survive and it is not known if he published. In 1895, Fitzgerald and four others started the Durham Drug Company, which was renamed the Fitzgerald Drug Company in 1901, and operated until 1910, when its name was changed. Also in 1901, Fitzgerald became the treasurer for Lincoln Hospital, founded for African Americans.

In 1898, Fitzgerald became the first president of the Coleman Manufacturing Company in Concord, North Carolina. This was the first cotton mill in the United States to be built, owned and operated by blacks. W. C. Coleman, for whom it was named, and several other partners were from Wilmington, North Carolina.

Fitzgerald also served as president of the Durham Real Estate, Mercantile, and Manufacturing Company, which was incorporated in 1899. It was "formed under the laws of the State of North Carolina to promote manufacturing and mercantile interests" for African Americans.

Fitzgerald was among the original incorporators of the Mechanics and Farmers Bank, which received its charter from the State of North Carolina in 1907. It opened its office in 1908 in the North Carolina Mutual Life Insurance Company Building on Parrish Street, which was known as the “Black Wall Street" of the city.

== Death and burial ==
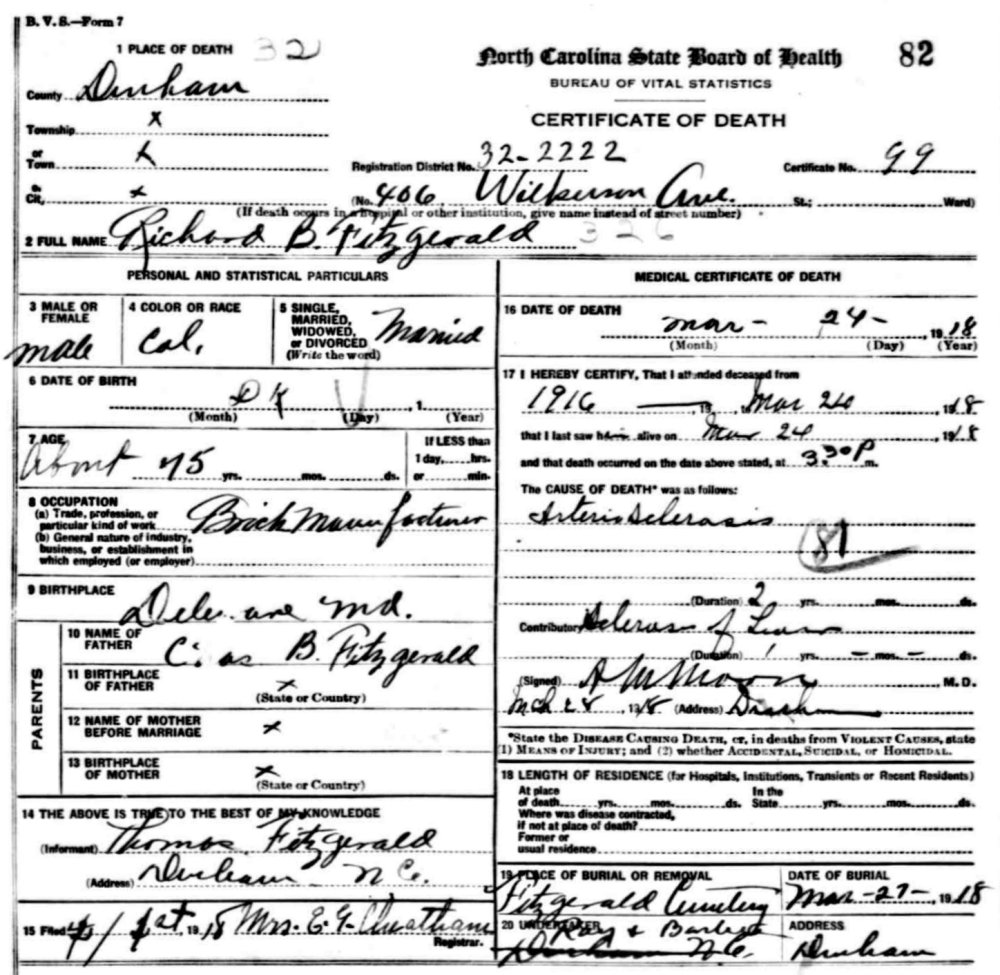
Richard Fitzgerald's death certificate, March 24, 1918

Richard Fitzgerald died on March 24, 1918. He is buried in what is known as the Fitzgerald section of the Maplewood Cemetery in Durham. This section was originally a private cemetery on the Fitzgerald family land around his large mansion. It was later annexed by the Maplewood Cemetery.

== Posthumous recognition ==
Richard Fitzgerald was recognized alongside C.C. Spaulding Sr. and John Merrick as Main Honorees by the Sesquicentennial Honors Commission at the Durham 150 Closing Ceremony in Durham, NC on November 2, 2019. The posthumous recognition was bestowed upon the group for their contributions to Durham as innovative leaders who established one of the nation's strongest African American entrepreneurial enclaves.

== Selected buildings constructed of Fitzgerald brick ==
- Central Prison; Raleigh (1870–84)
- Emmanuel AME Church; Kent Street, Durham (1888)
- St. Joseph's AME Church (now Hayti Heritage Center); Fayetteville Street, Durham (1891)
- Erwin Cotton Mills; West Main and Ninth streets, Durham (1892)
- Fitzgerald Building; corner of Chapel Hill and Kent streets, Durham (1910)
