= Rosindale, North Carolina =

- Unincorporated community
- Location within North Carolina Location within the United States
- Coordinates: 34°26′28″N 78°31′37″W
- Country: United States
- State: North Carolina
- County: Bladen
- Elevation: 128 ft (39 m)
- Time zone: UTC-5 (Eastern (EST))
  - Summer (DST): UTC-4 (EDT)
- Area codes: 910, 472
- GNIS feature ID: 1006356

Rosindale is an unincorporated community in Bladen County, North Carolina, United States.

== Notable people ==
- Aaron McDuffie Moore, physician, was born in Rosindale.
- George Henry White, member of the United States House of Representatives, was born in Rosindale.
