= Mechanics and Farmers Bank =

American banking and financial services corporation

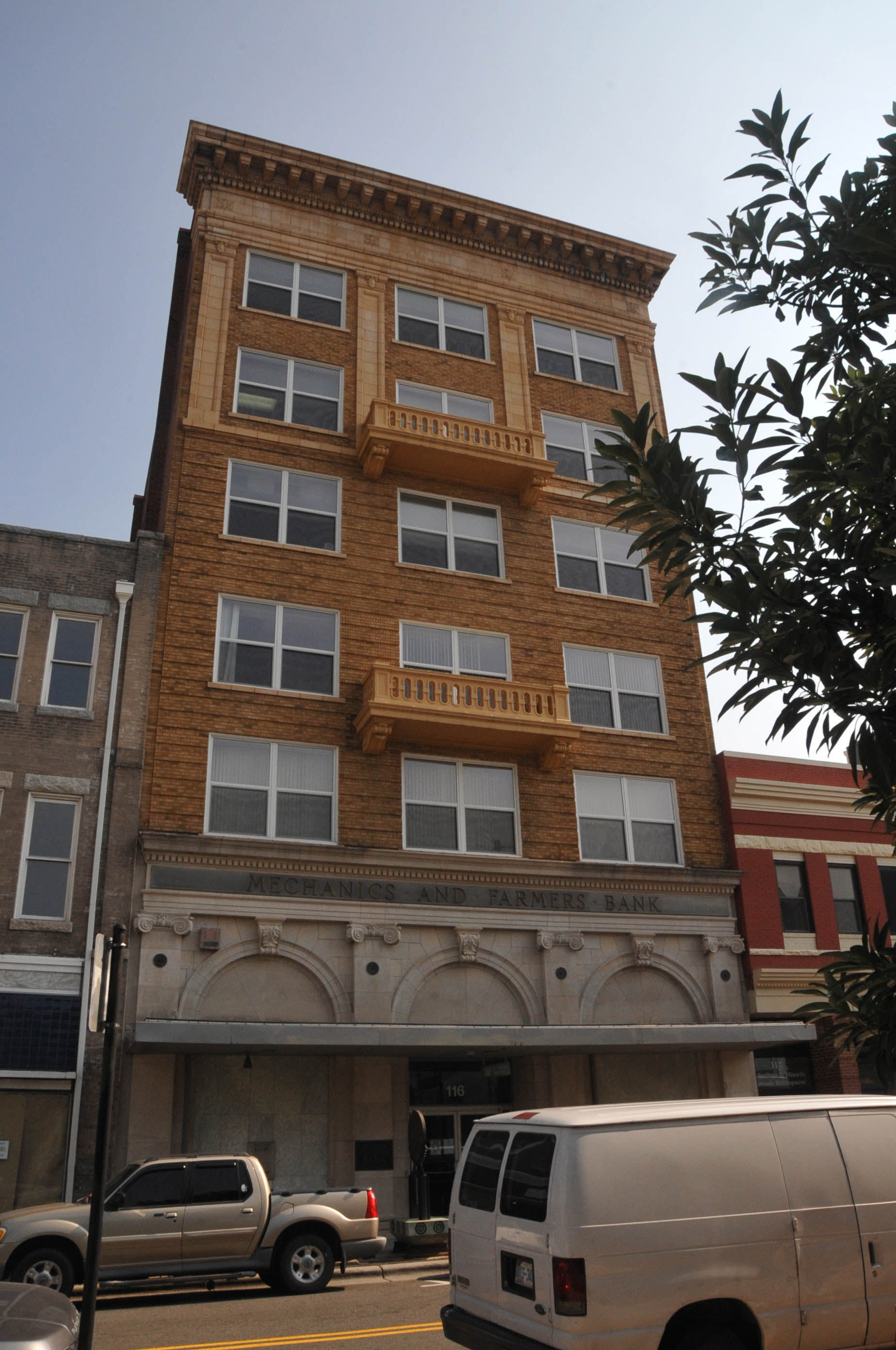
- The second headquarters of Mechanics and Farmers Bank in Durham, North Carolina.
- Type: Public
- Traded as: OTCID Basic: MFBP
- Industry: Financial services
- Founded: February 25, 1907
- Founder: William Gaston Pearson, Richard B. Fitzgerald, J. A. Dodson, S. L. Warren, James E. Shepard, John Merrick, W. O. Stevens
- Headquarters: Durham, North Carolina, United States
- Owner: M&F Bancorp, Inc.
- Website: mfbonline.com

The Mechanics and Farmers Bank (abbreviated as M&F Bank) is an American bank owned by M&F Bancorp, Inc based in Durham, North Carolina. It served as one of the most influential African-American businesses in North Carolina in the 20th century.

It is the second oldest Black-owned bank in the United States. As of July 2026, when M&F agreed to be acquired by Optus Bank of South Carolina, M&F Bank had two branches in Raleigh and Durham and one each in Charlotte, Winston-Salem and Greensboro.

== History ==
In 1907, Manassa Thomas Pope and M. A. Johnson, African-American academics from Raleigh, North Carolina, traveled to Durham to look into the possibility of establishing an African-American construction and loan association. Local African-Americans liked the idea, but they also desired to establish a bank. Seven African-American businessmen in Durham—William Gaston Pearson, Richard B. Fitzgerald, J. A. Dodson, S. L. Warren, James E. Shepard, John Merrick, and W. O. Stevens— raised $10,000 to start a banking institution. Joined by R. Hawkins, they secured a charter from the North Carolina General Assembly to incorporate the Mechanics and Farmers Bank on February 25, 1907. The bank's incorporators and stockholders held their first meeting on July 29 and elected Fitzgerald, Merrick and Pearson president, vice-president, and cashier of the bank, respectively. The Mechanics and Farmers Bank began operations on August 1, 1908, serving the public out of the North Carolina Mutual and Provident Association's headquarters in Hayti, the black business district in Durham. White managers from other institutions frequented Mechanics and Farmers Bank during its first week of operations to assist its employees. After North Carolina Mutual opened a new headquarters on West Parrish Street on December 17, 1921, the bank moved its offices to the first floor of that building, sharing the space with the Mutual Building and Loan Association. The bank's stated policy was to provide "no large loans...to a few profiteers, but rather conservative sums to needy farmers and laborers."

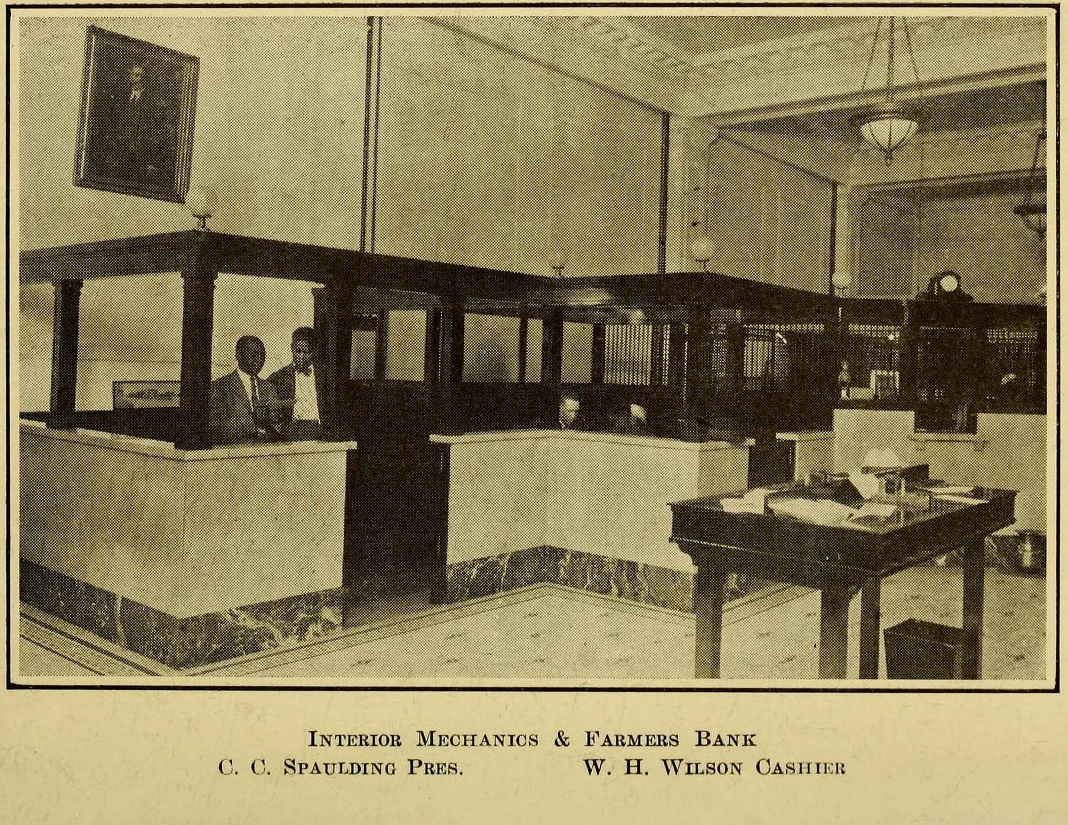
The inside of Mechanics and Farmers Bank in 1922, including bank president C. C. Spaulding

Over time the Mechanics and Farmers Bank became heavily financially involved in the operations of the North Carolina Mutual and Provident Association and loaned money to many other businesses in Hayti. By 1915, the bank possessed $50,000. In 1922 it acquired Fraternal Bank and Trust Co., another African-American owned bank in Durham, after community leaders and the shareholders of both institutions agreed that it would best to have single bank in Durham for the African-American population. By 1923, it was managing $113,000 of capital.

On January 1, 1923, the bank opened a branch building in Raleigh, making it one of only 119 banks in the United States and the only African-American-owned bank to operate a branch. Guided by its practice of making small loans, the bank lent money to customers for building homes and funding education, thus spurring further development of Durham's African-American middle class community. Throughout the 1920s the bank loaned $200,000 to individuals, ensuring the continued African-American ownership of over 500 properties. It also served the city's Jewish residents, loaning the money to construct a synagogue.

In 1929 robbers stole thousands of dollars from the Raleigh branch of the bank. Bank president Charles Spaulding arranged for large sums of cash to be transferred there from Durham to prevent the occurrence of a bank run by worried customers.

Later that year the New York Stock Exchange suffered a major collapse in trading. Banks across the country collapsed from bank runs by worried customers, but Mechanics and Farmers Bank weathered the financial turmoil, and 1929 was reported to be its most successful year up to that point. It was one of only two banks to continue operations in Raleigh in the wake of the stock market crash. The institution played a key role in helping African-American businesses in Durham survive the subsequent Great Depression. In 1933 U.S. President Franklin D. Roosevelt secured a mandated bank holiday, forcing all banks in the United States to temporarily close to prevent further economic decline. When Mechanics and Farmers Bank reopened, it was the first in the state to do so, was not burdened by any legal restrictions, and was able to meet its financial obligations. The institution became one of eight African-American banks in the country to survive the Great Depression. In 1935 it became the first lending institution in North Carolina to earn a Certificate of Authority from the U.S. Federal Housing Administration. By 1940 the bank's stock was worth $210,000. In 1952 John H. Wheeler became chief executive of the institution. He held the post until 1978.

In 1999 the bank's shareholders agreed to incorporate M&F Bancorp, Inc. to act as a holding company. Mechanic and Farmers Bank subsequently became its subsidiary. The company suffered its first annual net financial loss in its history in 2016.

On July 22, 2026, M&F Bank announced Optus Bank of South Carolina would take over M&F in a deal expected to be worth $105 million. Optus Bank, started in 1921 as Victory Savings Bank, was South Carolina's first Black-owned bank. The combined bank would take the Optus name after two years, and M&F CEO James Sill would be CEO.
