= North Carolina Mutual Life Insurance Company =

Defunct American insurance company

NC Mutual
- Formerly: North Carolina Mutual Life Insurance Company; North Carolina Mutual and Provident Association
- Type: Private
- Industry: Insurance
- Founded: Durham, North Carolina (August 22, 1898)
- Founder: John C. Merrick
- Defunct: October 31, 2022
- Fate: Under liquidation
- Headquarters: Durham, United States
- Area served: United States
- Key people: Michael L. Lawrence (President) & (CEO)
- Services: Insurance & Finance
- Total assets: US$162 million; US$162 million
- Total equity: Negative by at least US$78,350,851
- Subsidiaries: North Carolina Mutual Insurance Agency
- Website: Official website

NC Mutual (originally the North Carolina Mutual and Provident Association and later North Carolina Mutual Life Insurance Company) was an American life insurance company located in downtown Durham, North Carolina and one of the most influential African-American businesses in United States history. Founded in 1898 by local black social leaders, its business increased from less than a thousand dollars in income in 1899 to a quarter of a million dollars in 1910. The company specialized in "industrial insurance," which was basically burial insurance. The company hired salesmen whose main job was to collect small payments (of about 10 cents) to cover the insured person for the next week. If the person died while insured, the company immediately paid benefits of about 100 dollars. This covered the cost of a suitable funeral, which was a high prestige item in the black community. It began operations in the new tobacco manufacturing city of Durham, North Carolina, and moved north into Virginia and Maryland, then to major northern black urban centers, and then to the rest of the urban South.

For much of the 20th century it was the largest company run by African Americans.

The company came to be known as the world's largest African American business in only its first few years and is claimed by its home city of Durham as an important landmark. In the late 1800s and throughout the 1900s, Durham was known as "The Black Wall Street of America." for the progress that African Americans were making within the town. The company's founders, thought to be inspired by North Carolina business tycoon Washington Duke, included John Merrick and Aaron McDuffie Moore, two particularly influential men in Durham's history. North Carolina Mutual and its prosperity brought many good things to Durham's black community, and its founders and organizers were important contributors to social and economic progress in the city and particularly in its African American community.

In 2019, NC Mutual encountered financial difficulty that arose from a reinsurance transaction in which the assets securing the transaction were misappropriated by an investment manager. Wake County Superior Court placed the company in rehabilitation under control of the North Carolina Commissioner of Insurance. On October 11, 2022, a court approved the liquidation of NC Mutual effective October 31, 2022.

== Origins ==
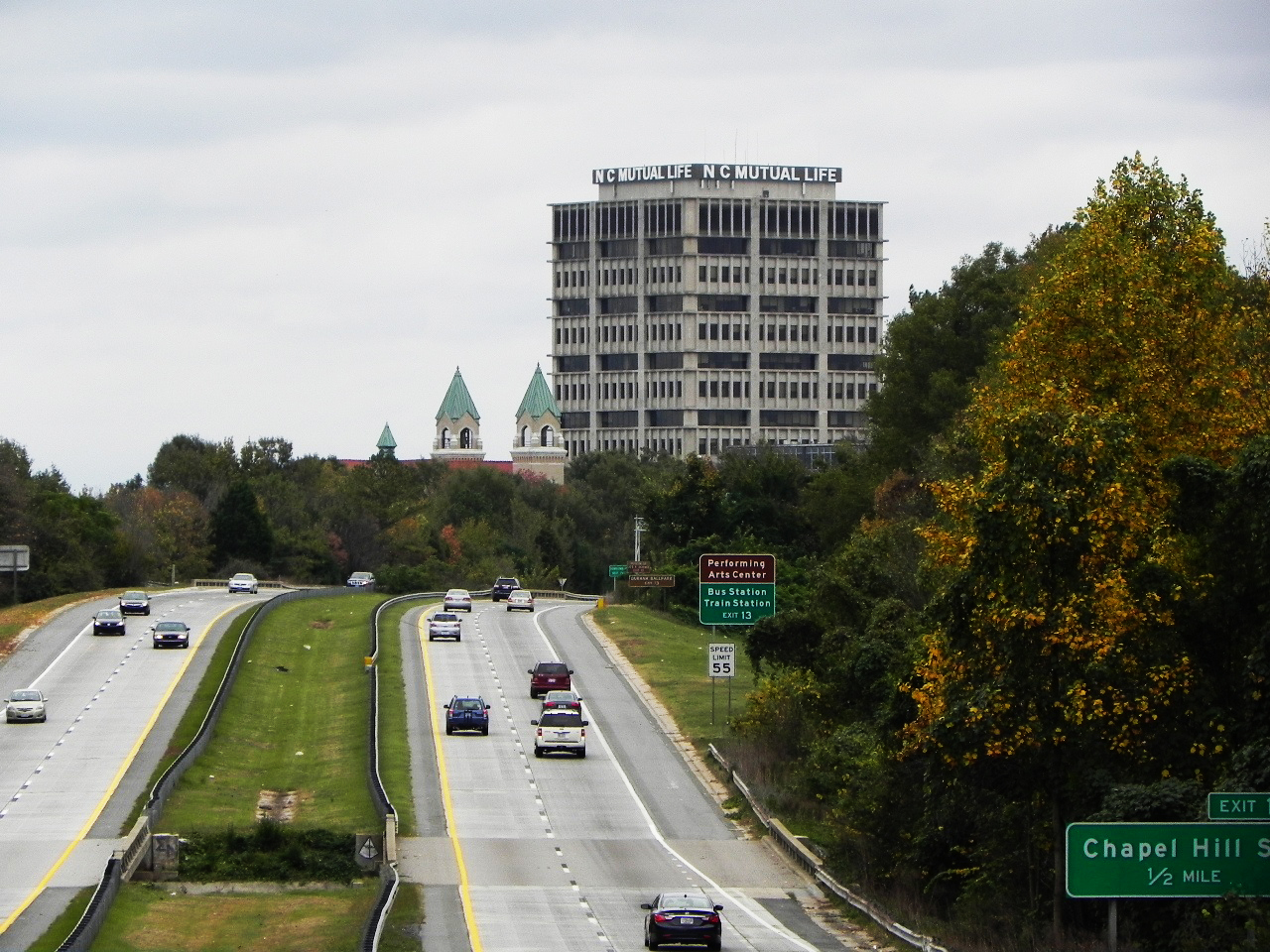
Downtown Durham view showing the North Carolina Mutual Life Insurance Company Headquarters. In 1965 the N.C. Mutual Life Insurance building became the tallest office building owned by African Americans in the United States. In 2006 the N.C. Mutual Life Insurance Co. building sold to a developer for only $11.4 million. N.C. Mutual remains in the building as a tenant under a long-term lease agreement.

North Carolina Mutual was the brainchild of black entrepreneur John C. Merrick in the late 1800s. Merrick was born into slavery as the son of a white man and a former slave in 1859. He grew up in Raleigh and Chapel Hill, two cities near Durham, and he learned various skills such as bricklaying and barbering during his youth. He moved to Durham in 1880 and opened his own barber shop in 1882. His hair-cutting business grew to include several stores, three for whites and two for blacks; the barbers were all black. Merrick himself cut hair for many people. The biggest influence came after John Merrick, along with four other partners, bought the Royal Knights of King David. The society was "a semi-religious fraternal and beneficial society for health and life insurance." In buying it, Merrick learned about insurance and how to relate the insurance business to African Americans.

Merrick knew that blacks had short life expectancies and that they generally had poor health, largely due to their low income. These things made the idea of starting an insurance business for African Americans a very risky one, because many people would be expected to die before they could contribute to the success of the business. However, they were also the reasons African Americans needed life insurance to begin with. Industrial insurance had the advantage of a premium collected every week that provided coverage for the following week. There was minimal need for tracking the changes of address of the customers.

Merrick decided that the opportunity to help blacks outweighed the risk, and he joined with investors Aaron Moore, William Gaston Pearson, Watson, Shepard, Johnson, and Dawkins to found the North Carolina Mutual and Provident Society in 1898. In the first year, there was a terrible lack of business, and the company lost money overall. Because of this, many investors left North Carolina Mutual, and by the time the company was reorganized in 1900, only Merrick, Moore, and Moore's young nephew Charles Clinton Spaulding remained. Spaulding was appointed General Manager with Merrick serving as President and Moore as his only other principal. Under this leadership, the growth of the company began.

== Leadership ==
John Merrick was the first president of N. C. Mutual, and he served as such from the company's founding until his death in 1919.

After Merrick's death, Dr. Aaron McDuffie Moore became president of the company. He was the first African American in Durham to practice medicine. After becoming president of N. C. Mutual, he devoted his full-time to the company until he died in 1923.

When Moore died, Charles Clinton Spaulding took over as president. Spaulding served on the board of trustees at Howard University beginning in 1936. he was active in the National Negro Insurance Association and the National Negro Bankers Association in the early 1900s and was one of few African American members of the New York Chamber of Commerce beginning in 1942. He also served on boards of trustees at Shaw University and North Carolina College. He was awarded the Harmon Foundation Gold medal for distinguished achievement in business, and he received honorary Law doctorates from Shaw University, Tuskegee University, and Atlanta University.

== Recent history ==
In 2019, NC Mutual encountered financial difficulty that arose from a reinsurance transaction in which the assets securing the transaction were misappropriated by an investment manager. Wake County Superior Court placed the company in rehabilitation under control of the North Carolina Commissioner of Insurance. The investment manager was subsequently charged with a federal crime.

On October 11, 2022, a court approved the liquidation of NC Mutual effective October 31, 2022.

== See also ==
- African-American business history
- Black Wall Street (Durham, North Carolina)
- Mutual Tower
- Mechanics and Farmers Bank Building
- North Carolina Mutual Building (South Carolina)
