= Aaron McDuffie Moore =

American physician

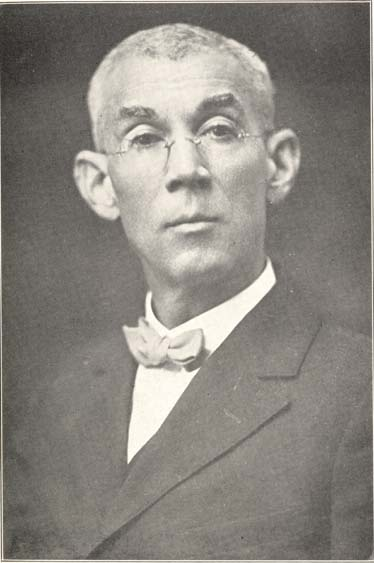
- Born: September 6, 1863; Rosindale, North Carolina
- Died: April 29, 1923 (aged 59)
- Occupation: Doctor

Aaron McDuffie Moore, M.D. (September 6, 1863 – April 29, 1923) was a medical doctor, medical director, and officer at a bank, hospital, pharmacy, university and insurer serving African Americans in North Carolina. He was born in Whiteville, North Carolina. He lived in Durham, North Carolina.

He was the first African-American medical doctor of Durham, North Carolina, USA, and a prominent leader in the African-American community based in the part of the city known as Hayti. He founded Lincoln Hospital, a medical facility that served Negro patients during a time of racial segregation. Moore was also instrumental to the incorporation of North Carolina Mutual Life Company, which became the largest black-owned business in the country, and the improvement of North Carolina's rural school education. Through philanthropic works and business enterprises, Moore played a significant role in improving the standard of living of African Americans in Durham. He also overcame racial discrimination, bridging the White and Black communities in Durham in addition to improving its healthcare and economy.

== Early life and education ==
Aaron McDuffie Moore was born on September 6, 1863, in Rosindale, North Carolina, to Israel Moore and Anna Eliza Spaulding Moore. Since the early nineteenth century, the Moore family, of African, Native American and European descent had owned land in Columbus County as free farmers. Like his nine siblings: 4 boys and 5 girls, Aaron Moore alternated between working on the family farm (during the harvesting and planting seasons) and attending the segregated county school. Upon completing 8th grade, Moore became a teacher at the same county school. He entered Whitin Normal School, in Lumberton, followed by the Normal School at Fayetteville to further his education. These institutions were both focused on teacher training, as education was considered key for freedmen's progress and there was an effort to develop black teachers for segregated schools across the state. However, after completing his first term at the latter, Moore was summoned home by his father to help on the farm.

=== Leonard Medical School ===
Ambitious beyond farming, Moore enrolled in 1885 in the newly established Shaw University, a historically black college in Raleigh, intending to become a professor. But, encouraged by his teachers who saw his promise, Moore entered the University's Leonard Medical School. Completing the prescribed 4 years of medical education in 3 years, Aaron Moore came before the Medical Examiners of the State of North Carolina in 1888. He passed the examinations and ranked second among the 46 candidates, 30 of whom were white. Having been certified as a Doctor of Medicine, Dr. Moore decided to practice in Durham, where he was the city's first Black medical doctor.

=== Marriage and family ===
In 1889, Moore married Cottie S. Dancy, niece of John C. Dancy, a leading African-American Republican in North Carolina. They had a family together, including daughter Lyda Moore Merrick.

=== Politics ===
Moore became interested in politics and was nominated for the office of coroner of Durham County in 1888. However, his campaign was met with much resistance from the white community, as shown by coverage in the Durham Recorder: "White men of Durham, those who have any respect for the Anglo-Saxon race, will you fail your duty on the 6th of November? Will you allow Negro rule or a white man's government?"

Moore was in a campaign marked by racial discrimination, as were many in those years. Euro-Americans were still trying to maintain dominance; by the end of the century while in control of the state legislature, they passed a constitution that essentially disfranchised blacks, a situation that persisted until federal legislation of the mid-1960s to enforce constitutional rights for minorities. Dismayed by the antagonism, Moore withdrew from the campaign and settled for supporting candidates who served the Durham community's interest.

== Self-help business enterprise ==
=== Early involvement ===
In 1895 Moore began to invest in new black-owned businesses, to enable the community to develop its own skilled educated class and provide jobs for them. The Durham Drug Company was the first of his many ventures. The pharmacy gave young African-American pharmacists an opportunity to practice and served Durham's African-American community with dignity and excellence. While the pharmacy never made much of a profit, earning profits was not Moore's chief goal. Instead, he made his priority the provision of affordable drugs to the Negro community. He believed that the "Negro business movement" was a means to achieve racial self-fulfillment. He became involved in numerous other black business ventures in Durham following this maiden enterprise. Through this work, Moore established strong relationships with significant figures such as John Merrick, with whom he would later found the North Carolina Mutual Life Insurance Company.

=== North Carolina Mutual and Provident Association ===
In October 1898, Moore, John Merrick and six other African-American men gathered in Moore's office to organize an insurance association. They were inspired by similar associations organized by African-Americans in Richmond, Virginia, in 1893 and 1894. During the meeting, each man pledged $50 to the association. They agreed to draw up a charter for the business, to be "presented as a bill before the State Assembly" in January 1899. With the charter approved, North Carolina Mutual and Provident Association opened for business on April 1, 1899. Moore served as its treasurer and medical director, albeit without salary or remuneration. In addition, Moore agreed to rent out a part of his office to the association for $2 a month, a sign of his commitment to the Black community served by the association.

By 1900, the association was in a precarious financial position as claims increased. In response, Moore and John Merrick used personal funds to meet the company's obligations. The other incorporators were unwilling to fund the deficit and, by July 1900, withdrew from the company. Moore understood that African Americans needed insurance services. He also believed strongly that North Carolina Mutual was accountable to the Negro community, and that "to desert their policy holders was to discredit their people". Moore and Merrick bought the shares of withdrawing members. For African-American businessmen like Moore, the purpose of business enterprises extended beyond profit; more importantly, it was a means to improve the conditions of the African-American community.

Moore assumed the vacated position of secretary while his nephew, C. C. Spaulding, promoted the sale of insurance policies. The partnership between Moore, Spaulding and Merrick as President transformed North Carolina Mutual and Provident Association into a strong enterprise. In 1919, the association was renamed North Carolina Mutual Life Insurance Company. When Merrick died that year, Moore assumed presidency of North Carolina Mutual until his death in 1923. As President, Moore was insistent that the Company stayed true to the purpose of its founding:

There was a larger truth... if the Company cannot live on truth, then let her go.

Dr. Aaron Moore rooted North Carolina Mutual Life Insurance Company in its "commitment to service", bringing much needed insurance services to the African American community in Durham. The access to reliable insurance services ensured that individuals could afford necessary treatment and healthcare services in times of need.

Through North Carolina Mutual, Moore also contributed to economic prosperity of the black community in Durham. Inspired by his success, other African-American leaders began to enter business, founding the Mechanics and Farmers Bank in 1907 and Mutual Community Savings Bank in 1921. As black business continued to thrive in tandem with North Carolina Mutual, a "robust business district in downtown Durham" was developed, becoming what became known as the Black Wall Street. The Black business movement contributed significantly to Durham's race relations; while there was interracial friction in other cities, Durham's Euro-Americans tolerated and some supported its Black businessmen, as their progress benefited the city as a whole. Moore was thus a key figure who not only stimulated growth in Durham, but also brought social progress to the city.

== Lincoln Hospital ==
Moore founded the Lincoln Hospital in 1901. Earlier in 1895, the Watts Hospital was completed, but its services were offered only to Whites. Recognizing the needs of the African American community, Moore proposed the construction of a hospital in 1898 to serve the African-American community. While some suggested that a separate wing for Negros be added to the city hospital, Moore rejected the idea, as African-American medical doctors and nurses would not be permitted to work at the hospital. With Merrick's help, Moore "raised $25,000 in the black community and $100,000 in the white community", $75,000 of which was contributed by the Duke family. The Dukes' contributed based on Moore's advocating for the hospital's merit, and because of their close relationship with Merrick. Moore directed the construction of Lincoln Hospital and oversaw its completion in 1901. He served as its Superintendent until his death in 1923.

Under Moore's leadership, the hospital served patients regardless of their ability to pay. It gained an increase in patronage and by 1914, added a new wing. Recognizing the need to train African-American nurses, Moore set up the associated Lincoln Hospital Training School of Nursing in 1903. In 1923, when he died, Moore bequeathed three properties to the hospital, an endowment to be used to generate income to fund students of the Lincoln Hospital Training School of Nursing.

Moore's most significant achievement was the Lincoln Hospital, which contributed greatly to healthcare in Durham and improved life in the African-American community. By establishing the Lincoln School of Nursing, Moore ensured a system to provide healthcare personnel for black Durham citizens.

Based on funding from both the black and white communities, the Lincoln Hospital was a symbol of racial cooperation and unity for a common purpose. Moore's success in rallying such White support was remarkable in an era of racial discrimination and segregation. With his reputation for competence, he commanded the attention of White leaders and spoke to them as equals. Some whites considered their contributions a kind of thanks for what they saw as Black support during the Civil War. The following was inscribed at the entrance of the Lincoln Hospital:

With grateful appreciation and loving remembrance of the fidelity and faithfulness of the Negro slaves to the Mothers and Daughters of the Confederacy, during the Civil War, this institution was founded by one of the Fathers and Sons.

Lincoln Hospital has since been absorbed as part of the Duke Regional Hospital, following its merger with Watts Hospital in 1976.

== Contribution to education ==
Moore advocated education in the African-American community. Besides serving on the Board of Trustees at his alma mater, Shaw University, Moore was also one of the largest donors to the school. He also established a library in Durham to serve the African-American community, which became the Stanford L. Warren branch of the Durham County Public Library on January 17, 1940. Besides improving the rural school system for Blacks in North Carolina, Moore also formed the Volkemenia and Shubert-Shakespeare clubs, which were created to provide African Americans with access to concerts, speakers and reading sessions.

=== Rural school movement for African Americans ===
With his personal experience in a rural school, Moore worked to improve these, which were typically underfunded by white local and state school authorities in the segregated system. Moore wrote about the need to improve rural schools in an April 26, 1915, letter to a state official:

These people in the main have not had enough schooling either to fit them for the demands of urban life or to make them content in the rural districts. The consequence is that a large percentage of them recruit the criminal class in the towns or remain in the rural districts as discouraged and nonproductive constituents... This failure on the part of the rural schools has become more apparent in recent years than before. In a rough way, the lessening of interest in the rural school and its problems has been coincidental with the disfranchisement of the colored voter... At present the appropriations by the Durham County Board average twice as much for each white child enrolled as for each colored child. Doubtless, the same discrimination is a common practice in all of the counties of the state in a greater or less degree.

From 1914 until his death in 1923, Moore concentrated on improving rural schools for African-American children. He hired George W. Davis, North Carolina's first rural school inspector, at his own expense. Moore wanted to document the condition of the poor rural schools. Moore raised money for the schools through the Rosenwald Fund, established by philanthropist Julius Rosenwald of Chicago to aid the construction of rural schools, especially for African-American children, as their schools were underfunded. The Fund's contributions were based on matching monies raised by local communities, and also required a commitment by white-run school boards. African-American parents were so eager for schools that they often taxed themselves. In order to stimulate school involvement, he proposed that schools must "put down dollar for dollar for its own improvements". Following Moore's success, the state of North Carolina took over his work while the North Carolina Teachers' Association made him the Secretary-Treasurer of its Rural School Extension Department, a position he served until 1922.

== Legacy ==
Moore is remembered as an individual who "transcended his times" for his ability to stand as equals with Euro-American leaders. Capitalizing on this high ground, he improved standards of living for the African American community in Durham and North Carolina through his contributions to education, healthcare and social enterprises. To the disenfranchised African American community, "he emerges from the history of Black Durham as a Messiah moving quietly among the people, giving aid and comfort". Race relations in Durham also improved following Moore's leadership in the African-American business movement, which ushered in an age of cooperation between Black and White business leaders. His partnership with the Euro-American community in social projects such as the Lincoln Hospital also served to forge stronger bonds between the two races. Today, the Lincoln Hospital is remembered as "a monument of [the] spirit of racial cooperation". Moore also spoke strongly against Jim Crow and racial discrimination.

Today a historic marker stands on 1201 Fayetteville Rd, Durham, North Carolina to honor the contributions of Moore.

== Posthumous recognition ==
Moore was recognized as a Main Honoree by the Sesquicentennial Honors Commission at the Durham 150 Closing Ceremony in Durham, NC on November 2, 2019. The posthumous recognition was bestowed upon 29 individuals "whose dedication, accomplishments and passion have helped shape Durham in important ways."
