= John Merrick (insurance) =

American businessman

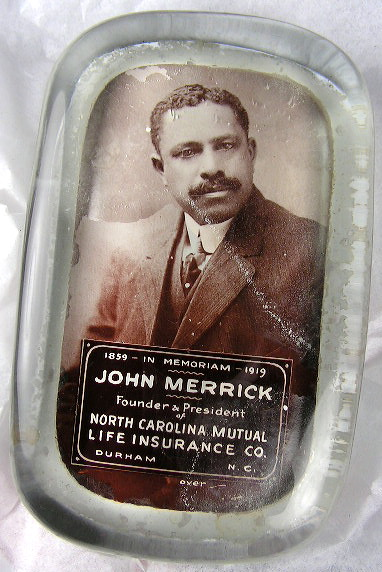
1919 Memorial Paperweight

John Merrick (1859–1919) was an American businessman. Born into slavery in Clinton, North Carolina, Merrick founded various companies in the Raleigh, North Carolina and Durham, North Carolina areas, most notably the North Carolina Mutual Life Insurance Company. Portions of his wealth were channeled back into the Black community through philanthropy. His business acumen and social consciousness made him one of the most influential members of the African-American community in his lifetime.

== Early life ==
Merrick was born into slavery in Clinton, North Carolina on September 7, 1859. Following his emancipation, Merrick learned to read and write at a Reconstructionist school. Most newly freed Black people at this time were merely trying to survive, as they lacked many of the rights that their white counterparts possessed. Black people also faced discrimination and a lack of economic opportunities due to opposition to their emancipation. Growing up in this environment, Merrick was forced to begin work at a young age in order to support his parents and siblings. Merrick became a brick mason while simultaneously learning the barber trade “during a lull in construction” in order to make ends meet. In the brickyards, Merrick had a first-hand look at Durham's impoverished black population, “whose improvidence impressed upon his mind the thought of doing something for their protection”. His early jobs paved the way for Merrick's future success as a barbershop entrepreneur and later as a business mogul and philanthropist.

== Business career ==
=== Barbering ===
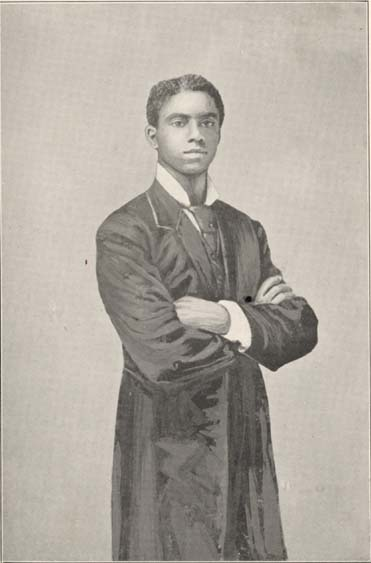
John Merrick at the Age of 20

Merrick's first financially successful business venture was his ownership of barbershops in the Durham area. His eventual financial achievements in the barbershop business gave him the necessary experience and resources to kick start his later business endeavors. Merrick joined John Wright, “a fellow barber,” who decided to “establish a [barbershop] business” in Durham and “offered [Merrick] employment in the new shop”. Eventually, Merrick became a partner in the barbershop, and ultimately became the sole owner of the business when Wright retired. Owning the Durham barbershop brought Merrick immense personal success. He rose from an “un-schooled, self-trained boy to a successful businessman and substantial citizen”. John N. Ingham notes that few blacks in the late 1800s demonstrated such adroitness for business success. Merrick later expanded the barbershop business by opening many more branches and became extremely successful. Through his entrepreneurial experiences in the barbershop business, Merrick accumulated wealth and was able to build relationships with many prominent white families of the time. His financial success allowed him to live somewhat extravagantly, purchasing a lavish “six-room cottage” for his family. Merrick's barbershops “catered to wealthy white men”, and Merrick's endearing and industrious attitude—he was noted to be unselfish and altruistic—allowed for his powerful white clients to become his friends. Many older members of Durham's African American community told stories of the fabulous gifts that Merrick received from his white confidantes. The networking and relationships that his barbershop business allowed for would serve Merrick well in his future business undertakings and enable him to develop the necessary social skills to thrive in a white-dominated society. The success that the barbershop brought John Merrick was uncommon for a black man. Reconstruction had only just concluded, yet Merrick was already beginning to transcend financial racial barriers. His wealth and influence among numerous prominent white families of the time was extremely rare for someone of his race during this time period, and these resources paved the way for even more individual success.

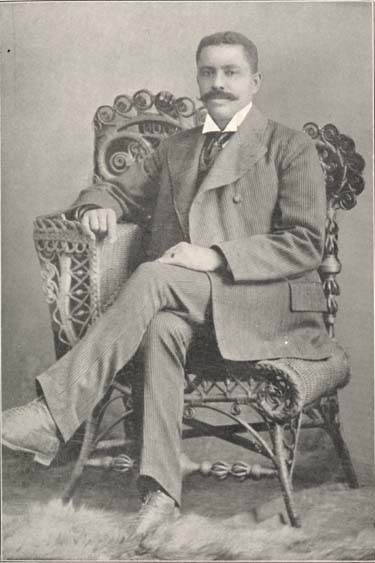
John Merrick at the Age of 35

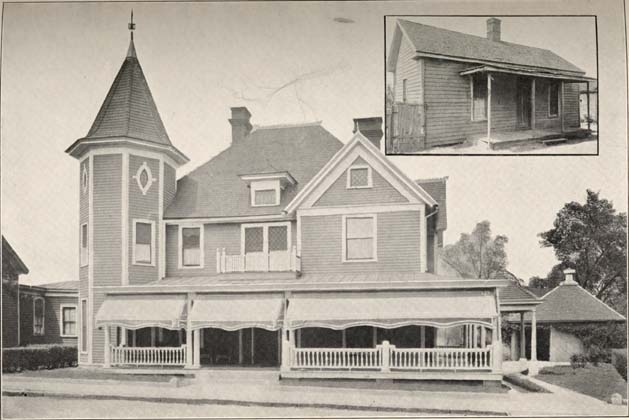
The Merrick Residence. Inset of John Merrick's First Home

=== Insurance career ===
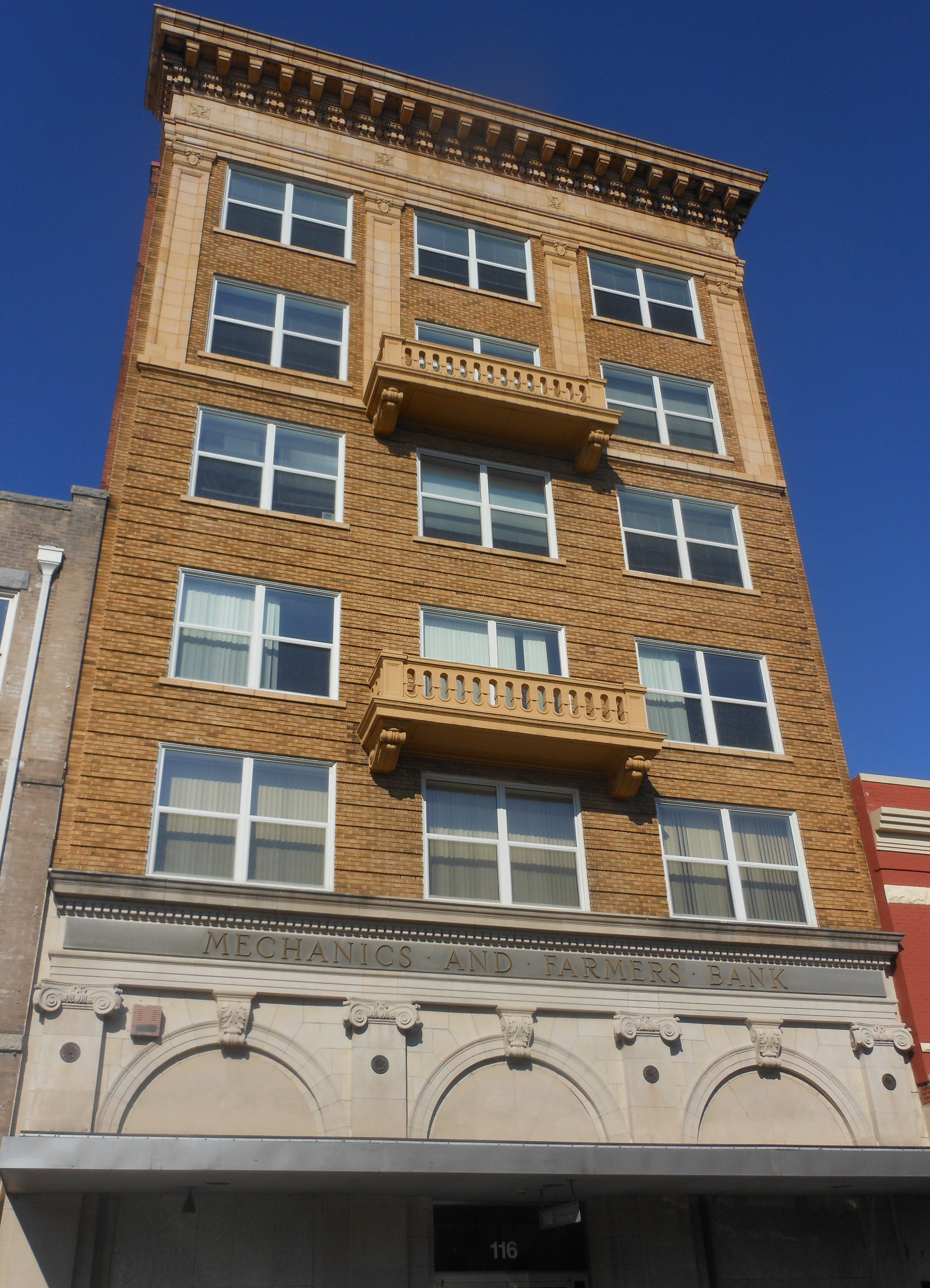
Mechanics and Farmers Bank building in Durham, North Carolina

Merrick's early success in the barbershop business led him to expand into other ventures. During his career he became involved in several businesses in Durham, North Carolina, including the North Carolina Mutual Life Insurance Company, the Merrick-Moore-Spaulding Real Estate Company, the Mechanics and Farmers Bank, and the Bull City Drug Company. Historian R. Andrew McCants noted that Merrick's success as a businessman helped position him as a leader in community enterprises.

Merrick's most significant undertaking was the founding of the North Carolina Mutual Life Insurance Company. To establish the business he secured financial backing from industrialist Washington Duke, one of his customers in Durham. Working with Dr. Aaron Moore and Charles C. Spaulding, Merrick helped build the company into one of the largest African American–owned businesses in the United States.

By the early twentieth century the company had sold $4,986,344.40 in insurance and conducted business across several southern states. Contemporary sources described the enterprise as the “world’s largest Negro business.”

=== Additional business ventures ===
Merrick's other business ventures brought him affluence, power, and prominence as well. He established the Mechanics and Farmers Bank, the first bank in Durham owned, controlled by African Americans,” which grew rapidly and was supported by black citizens at the time. Additionally, Merrick was instrumental in the formation of an African American drug store in Durham, namely the Bull City Drug Company. Merrick's plethora of business undertakings brought him wealth, power, and influence. Merrick was a well-known figure of amongst Durham's citizens. Durham's black community considered Merrick an ally because of his relationships with the “big whites” of Durham and his ability to “be a friend” to his townspeople. He was successful not only in his financial achievements but in that his persona, wit, and success earned him reverence from blacks and whites alike, as can be seen by his friendships with Durham's citizens, ranging from the poorest black farmers to the prominent white families of the time.

== Contributions to African-American community in Durham ==
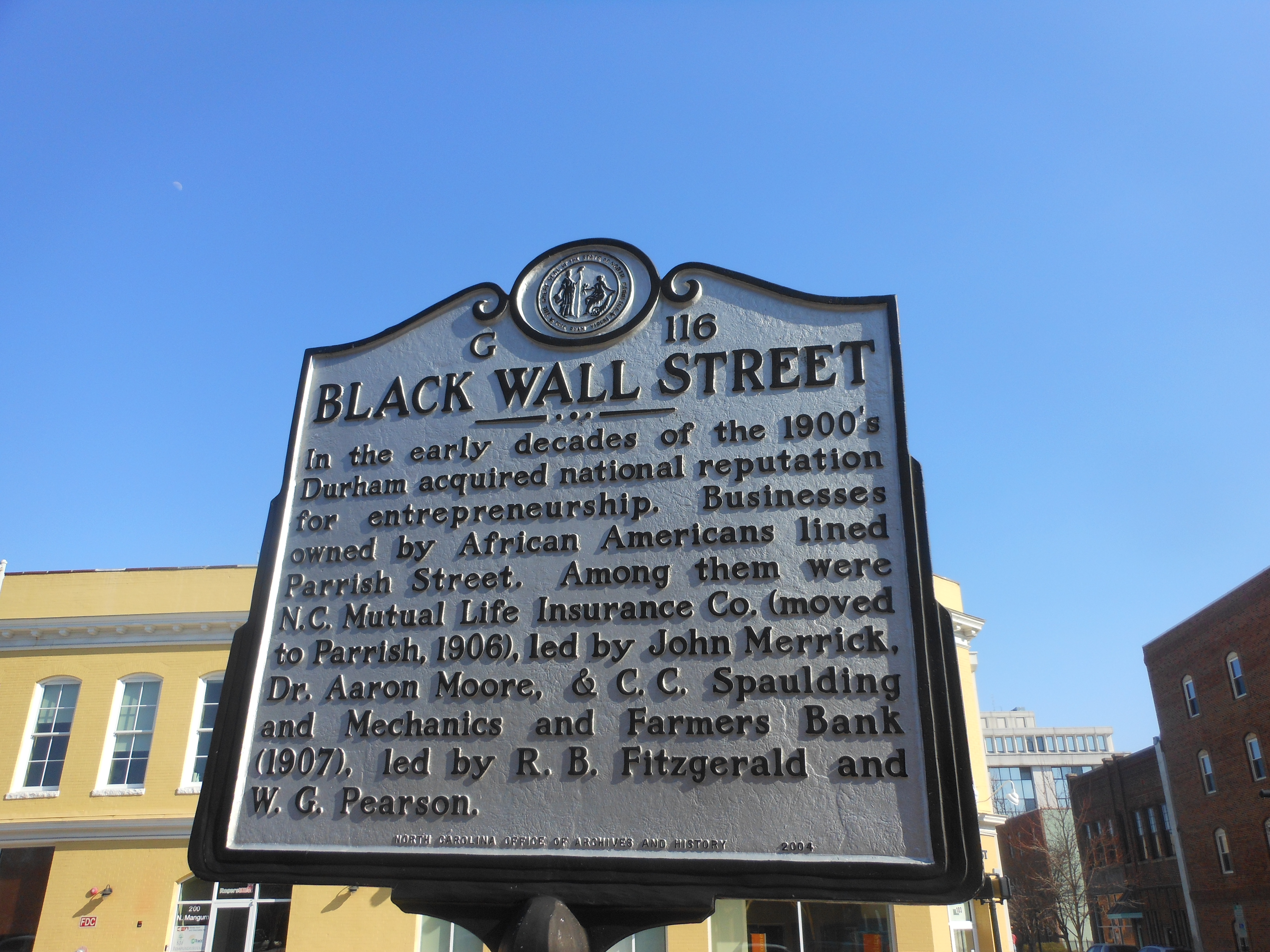
Historic "Black Wall Street" of Durham

Merrick channeled his commercial success back into Durham's African-American community via philanthropy. Most of the influential and powerful American citizens at the time were white and did not care enough to help address the issues of African American poverty, lack of necessary services, and lack of education. In fact, whites went out of their way to degrade blacks by keeping them ignorant and denying them services that we consider second nature today. This is where Merrick stepped in—every company he helped establish provided a necessary service to the African Americans of Durham that they otherwise, in all likelihood, would not have had access to. There is a sense of security that results from knowing one's family will be taken care of financially if one were to meet a tragic fate, and Merrick provided Durham's blacks with this security when he started the North Carolina Mutual Life Insurance Company. He was “concerned with providing insurance protection for his race” and used his initial success in the barbershop business to launch a new company that would ease this concern and aid his people. The formation of Merrick's first company served as a transition into other ways that Merrick could help his African American community: he started the Merrick-Moore-Spaulding Real Estate Company in order to provide blacks in Durham with real estate insurance, because “regulations prevented North Carolina Mutual Life from offering” this service to customers. Merrick's formation of the black Mechanics and Farmer's Bank also provided necessary banking services to black citizens in order to stimulate personal and business spending, for in the era following the emancipation of slaves, most white banks in the south refused to loan money to blacks. Additionally, John Merrick's creation of a colored drug store provided Durham's African American population with necessary medicines and remedies that they otherwise would not have access to, for at the time of the store's opening, there was only one African American drug store in Durham, which was “not centrally located for the population”. Finally, Merrick helped “provide a home” for a public library for Durham's African American children and donated $1,000 towards the library's maintenance. Through his philanthropic business ventures and charitable use of his accumulated wealth, Merrick provided the blacks of Durham with many necessary services that they would otherwise be ignorant of and lack access to. Not only did Merrick recirculate his wealth back into the Durham community to increase the quality of life of Durham's black citizens; he also provided them with job opportunities that would not be known by or available to them otherwise. During the Post-Reconstruction era, it was unlikely to see an African American businessman. Although it had been a few decades since black slaves had been freed, they remained at the bottom of the United States' social hierarchy. Racial norms dictated that they were to follow in their relatives’ footsteps—to do the same work that their parents and grandparents had done. This “work” consisted mainly of farming, as most freed slaves became sharecroppers after their emancipation, for farming was all they knew. However, Merrick's many businesses created novel and different job opportunities for blacks that they would not have had access to otherwise.

== Personal life ==
In 1880, Merrick lived with his wife Martha Hunter Merrick in Raleigh, North Carolina where he attended barbering school. By 1900, the Merrick family included five children—three daughters (Geneva, Mabel and Martha) and two sons (Edward and John). The household also included other extended family members.

== Legacy ==
A new black middle class emerged in Durham. The city's black elite had the chance to explore the real estate, insurance, banking, and pharmaceutical industries instead of accepting the strenuous, run-of-the-mill jobs that whites did not want. It is noted in Merrick's biography that “young pharmacists” in the black community who did not have an opportunity to practice their trade were finally able to have access to the job that they truly desired with the development of the Bull City Drug Company. Durham's blacks finally had opportunities to explore employment options that would not have been available to them had Merrick not started his many businesses. Merrick's powerful status also served as an example to Durham's black community that they could rise to prominence and achieve entrepreneurial success no matter their skin tone. His financial success and rising influence gave them hope—if John Merrick, a black once bound to slavery, could start his own business and ultimately build an empire, why couldn't they? The Journal of Negro History notes that, because blacks now had opportunities to be employed by new businesses or to create their own businesses, they “emerged into a new social, economic, and intellectual order”. For example, following the successes of Merrick's various companies, some of Durham's other black citizens started a hosiery mill, the success of which was so large that “it soon had a chain of fourteen mills”. John Merrick's example got the ball rolling in black business, creating a unique “black Wall Street” in Durham. Merrick helped create economic prosperity among the blacks of Durham, which laid the foundation for the establishment of a future self-sustaining community of independent, educated, and experienced black businessmen, which served as another small step in the fight for racial equality. John Merrick was an exceptional figure in North Carolina's history. Not only did he defy supposed set-in-stone racial roles in order to achieve affluence that was customarily uncommon for blacks at the time, but he also rose to greatness with support from whites themselves. Merrick then directed his wealth back into his community, and by doing so, provided services to blacks that improved their quality of life and presented them with new and diverse job opportunities. His achievements served as an example that opened the door for a black business class to emerge in Durham.

== Posthumous recognition ==
John Merrick was recognized alongside C.C. Spaulding Sr. and Richard Fitzgerald as Main Honorees by the Sesquicentennial Honors Commission at the Durham 150 Closing Ceremony in Durham, NC on November 2, 2019. The posthumous recognition was bestowed upon the group for their contributions to Durham as innovative leaders who established one of the nation's strongest African American entrepreneurial enclaves.
