= Charles Clinton Spaulding =

American businessman (1874–1952)

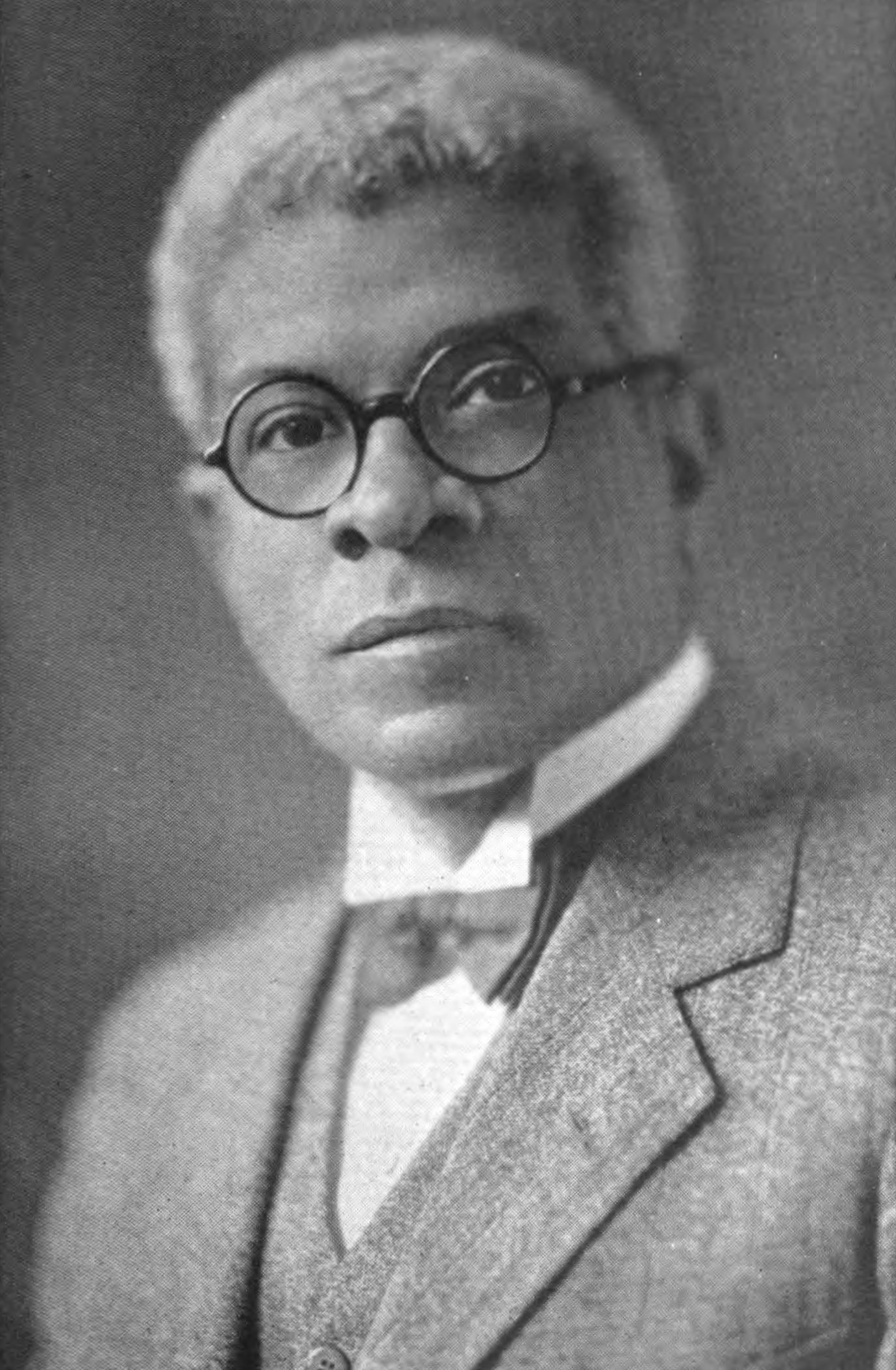
Charles Clinton Spaulding

Charles Clinton Spaulding (August 1, 1874 – August 1, 1952) was an American business leader. For close to thirty years, he presided over North Carolina Mutual Life Insurance Company, which became America's largest black-owned business, with assets of over 40 million US$ at his death.

== Biography ==
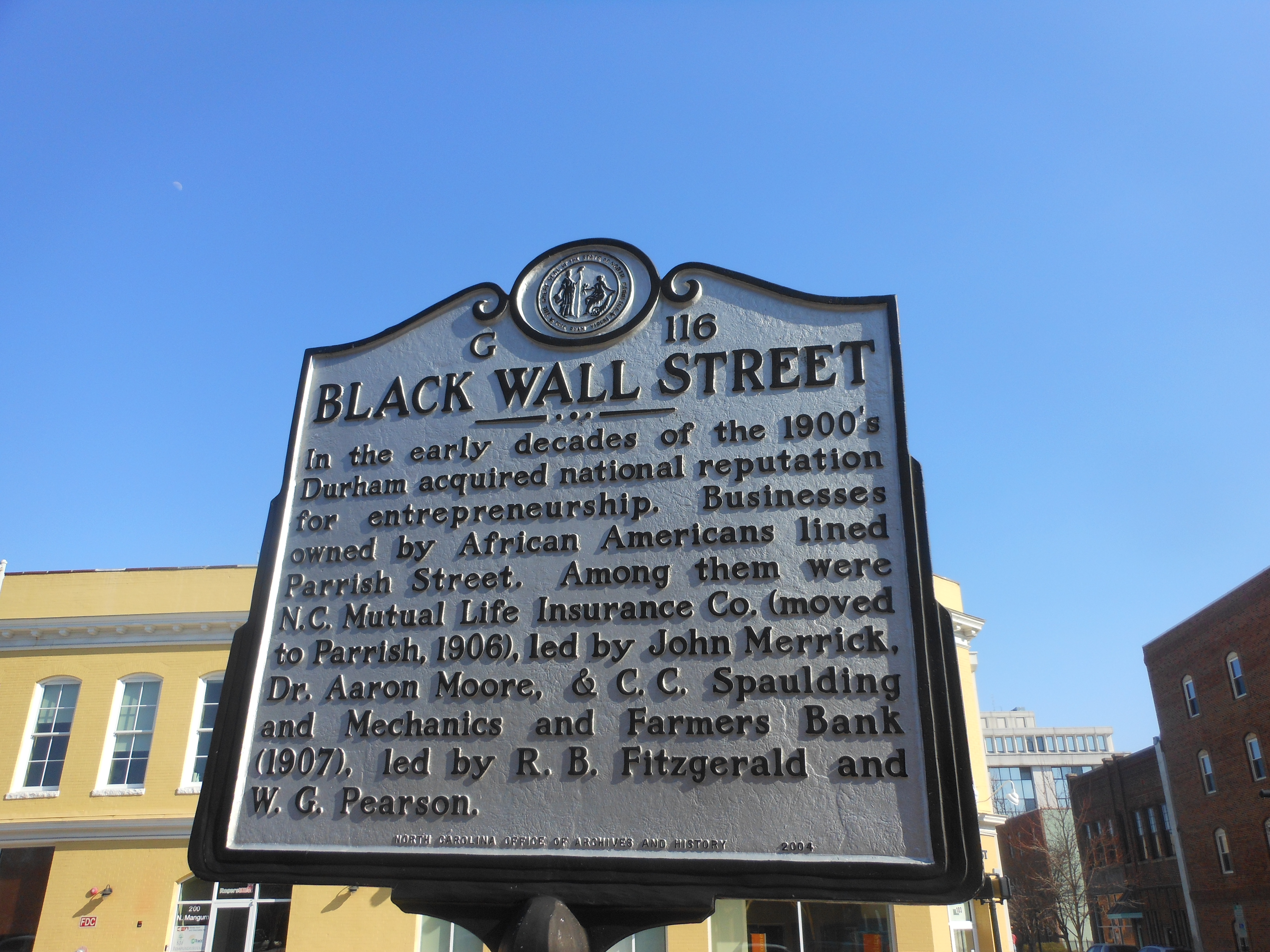
"Black Wall Street" marker in Durham

Spaulding was born in Columbus County, North Carolina to Benjamin Mack Spaulding, Senior (1845–1921) and Margaret Ann Virginia Moore (1849–1920).

He started out as a dishwasher and became general manager of a grocery company. In 1898, John Merrick, the owner of several barber shops, and Aaron M. Moore, a practicing physician, founded an insurance company, then named North Carolina Mutual and Provident Association. Merrick and Moore employed Spaulding in 1899 and he soon became general manager. After Moore's death in 1923, Spaulding took over as NC Mutual's president, serving until 1952.

The company specialized in "industrial insurance", which was basically burial insurance. The company hired salesmen whose main job was to collect small payments (of about 10 cents) to cover the insured person for the next week. If the person did die while insured, the company immediately paid benefits of about 100 dollars. This covered the cost of a suitable funeral, which was a high-prestige item in the black community.

Spaulding died on his 78th birthday in Durham, North Carolina. He was buried in Beechwood Cemetery.

== Leadership roles ==
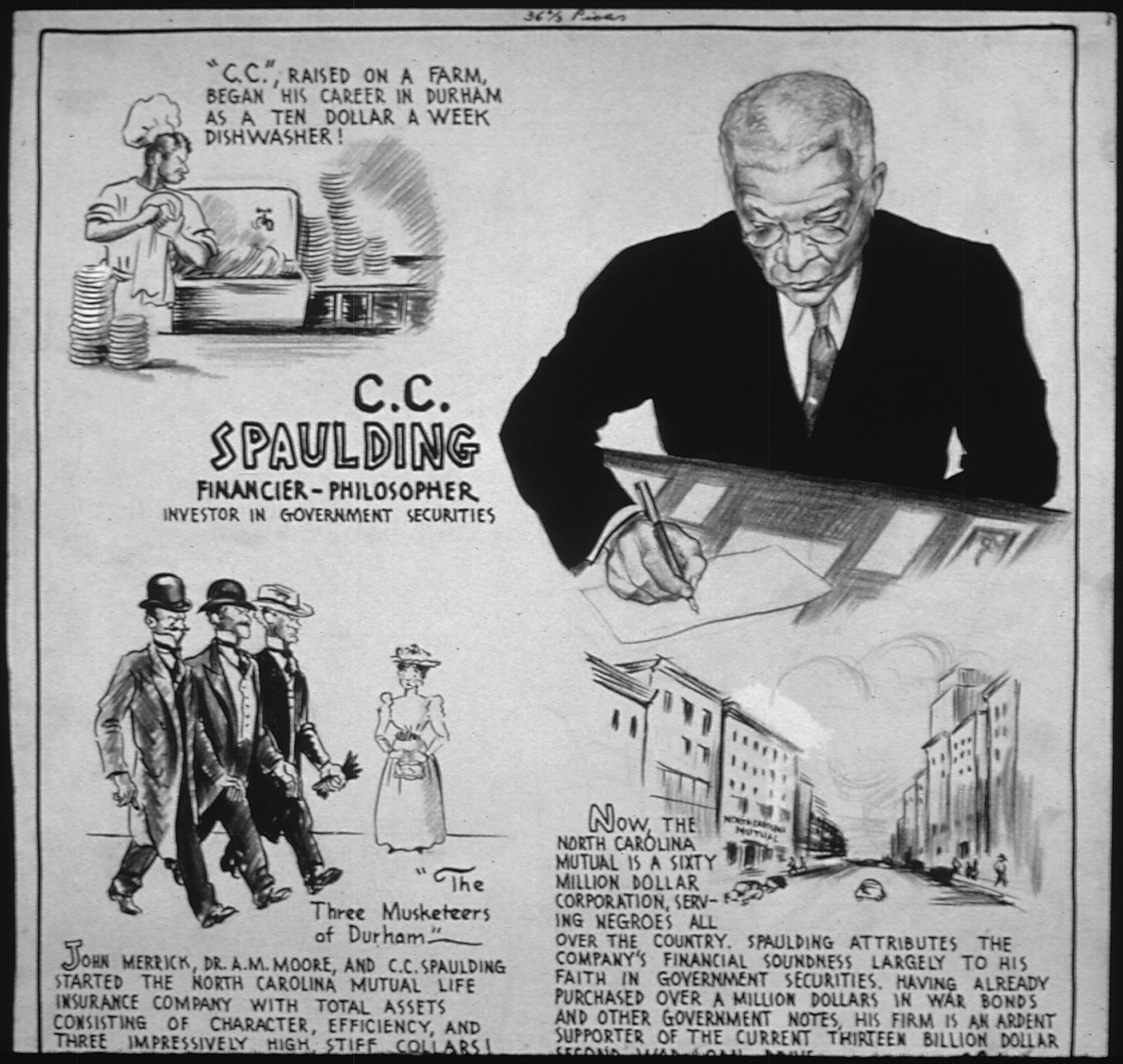
Poster from Office of War Information. Domestic Operations Branch. News Bureau, 1943

Spaulding provided leadership in the National Negro Insurance Association and the National Negro Bankers Association by 1920. In 1942, the New York Chamber of Commerce, mainly a white body, elected him to membership. He served as a trustee for Howard University, Shaw University, and North Carolina College at Durham.

He was also active in politics. He helped establish the Durham Committee on Negro Affairs in 1935, serving as its first chairman. As national chairman of the Urban League's Emergency Advisory Council from 1930 to 1939, he campaigned to secure New Deal jobs for African-Americans.

== Awards and honors ==
In 1926 Spaulding was awarded the Harmon Foundation Gold Medal for distinguished achievement in business. Shaw University, Tuskegee Institute and Atlanta University conferred honorary Doctorates of Law on him.

Spaulding was recognized alongside John Merrick and Richard Fitzgerald as Main Honorees by the Sesquicentennial Honors Commission at the Durham 150 Closing Ceremony in Durham, NC on November 2, 2019. The posthumous recognition was bestowed upon the group for their contributions to Durham as innovative leaders who established one of the nation's strongest African American entrepreneurial enclaves.

== Sources ==
- The African American Registry
- Great People of Color
