= List of neighborhoods in Durham, North Carolina =

The following is a list of neighborhoods and districts in Durham, North Carolina.

- Braggtown
- Burch Avenue Historic District
- Cleveland Street District
- Country Club Heights / Umstead Pines
- Croasdaile
- Duke Forest
- Durham Cotton Mills Village Historic District
- East Durham Historic District
- Edgemont
- Forest Hills Historic District
- Foster and West Geer Streets Historic District
- Garrett Farms
- Golden Belt Historic District
- Hayti
- Holloway Street District
- Hope Valley Historic District
- Lakewood Park Historic District
- Morehead Hill Historic District
- North Durham-Duke Park District
- Pearl Mill Village Historic District
- Southside–Saint Teresa
- Stadium Heights
- Stokesdale Historic District
- Treyburn
- Trinity Heights
- Trinity Park
- Walltown
- Watts–Hillandale Historic District
- West Durham Historic District
- Village Hearth
