= Geer Cemetery =

Historic cemetery in North Carolina, US

Coordinates: 36.0103°N 78.8839°W

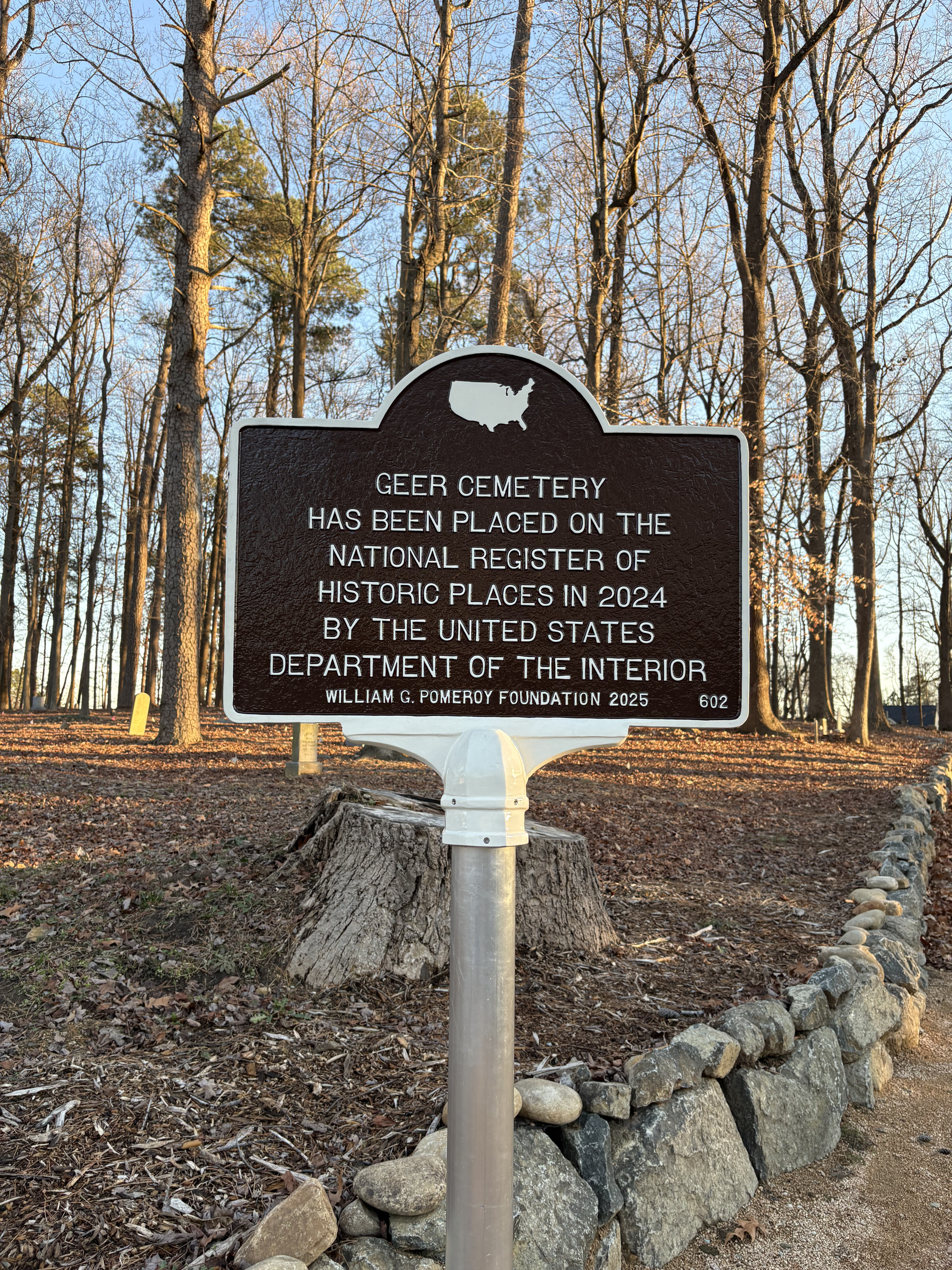
- Historic marker at the cemetery's entrance
- Interactive map of Geer Cemetery

Details
- Established: 1876
- Closed: 1939
- Location: 800 Colonial Street; Durham, North Carolina, U.S.
- Type: African American cemetery
- Size: 4 acres (1.6 ha)
- No. of graves: Over 1,500
- Geer Cemetery
- U.S. National Register of Historic Places
- NRHP reference No.: 100010672
- Added to NRHP: August 5, 2024

Geer Cemetery (1876–1939) is an African-American cemetery located on Colonial Street between McGill Place and Camden Avenue in northeast Durham, North Carolina. It has also been known as City Cemetery, Old City Cemetery, East Durham Cemetery, and Mason Cemetery. The cemetery was listed on the National Register of Historic Places in 2024.

== History ==
In the 1870s, a white farmer named Jesse B. Geer sold his land to three African-American men, John O'Daniel, Nelson Mitchell, and Willis Moore. O'Daniel, Mitchell, and Moore established the cemetery on the plot of land.

It currently occupies about 4 acres (1.6 ha), and contains the graves of over 1,500 African Americans, many born into slavery. It was the first cemetery for African Americans in Durham, and from 1876, when it opened, to 1924 it was the only one. In 1939 it was closed as overcrowded by the health department, although there was a burial in 1944. The city of Durham lists ownership of the cemetery as "Unknown".

In 2004 the cemetery was "heavily overgrown and...nearly invisible"; it was impossible to walk through it. The city, in collaboration with Friends of Geer, a volunteer group, and Keep Durham Beautiful Inc., has cleared the site of trees, litter, and debris, suppressed vine and weed growth, restored tilted and fallen headstones, and smoothed a gravel road through the cemetery. A stone sign was erected on Camden Street. In 2015, the 150th anniversary of North Carolina's ratification of the Thirteenth Amendment, the Friends of Geer Cemetery held an event at the cemetery.

Since at least 2020, the Friends of Geer Cemetery have partnered with faculty at Duke University, particularly Professor Adam Rosenblatt, to research the history of the cemetery and the people buried there. The cemetery was added to the National Register of Historic Places in August 2024, following advocacy from cemetery officials.

== Notable burials ==
- Edian Markham, founder of St. Joseph's African Methodist Episcopal Church
- Margaret Ruffin Faucette, founder of Durham's White Rock Baptist Church
- Augustus Shepard, father of James E. Shepard, founder of North Carolina Central University
