= Mena Webb =

American writer and editor

- Born: Wilhelmena Katherine Fuller; April 26, 1915; Atlanta, Georgia, U.S.
- Died: May 23, 2012 (aged 97); Durham, North Carolina, U.S.
- Education: University of North Carolina at Chapel Hill; Duke University
- Occupations: Writer, journalist, editor
- Spouse: Henry Bond Webb
- Children: 2
- Parent(s): Ralph Bell Fuller; Caro Lou Bacon
- Relatives: Thomas Charles Fuller (granduncle); William Bell (great-grandfather)

Wilhelmena Katherine Fuller "Mena" Webb (April 26, 1915 – May 23, 2012) was an American writer and editor. She taught writing classes at the University of North Carolina at Chapel Hill's Evening College, was a columnist and society editor at The Herald-Sun, a novelist, and the author of a biography on the industrialist Julian Carr.

== Early life, family, and education ==
Webb was born Wilhelmena Katherine Fuller in Atlanta on April 26, 1915, to Ralph Bell Fuller and Caro Lou Bacon Fuller. She was the granddaughter of Bartholomew Fuller, a Presbyterian elder and civic leader who served on the Board of Education for Durham Public Schools. She was a grandniece of Thomas Charles Fuller, a Confederate politician, and a niece of Thomas Blount Fuller, a prominent businessman and civic leader. Her great-grandfather was Scottish architect William Bell. Webb was named after her grandmother, Wilhelmina Haldane Bell Fuller.

When Webb was six weeks old, her family moved to Durham, North Carolina and lived in a house on Cleveland Street, across from the Fuller School, which was named after her grandfather. She was educated in Durham city schools and went on to attend Duke University, the University of North Carolina at Chapel Hill, and the Croft Secretarial and Accounting School.

== Career ==
Webb worked at The Durham Sun as a society editor. She also wrote her own stories and short pieces, the first published story was titled Childish Things and was included in the University of North Carolina's periodical Writers by Moonlight. Webb taught writing courses at the University of North Carolina at Chapel Hill's Evening College.

In 1969, she published her first novel, titled The Curious Wine. In 1987, she published a biography on Julian Shakespeare Carr called Jule Carr: General Without an Army. She also wrote a historical column for the Durham Sun and the Durham Morning Herlad called The Way We Were: Remembering Durham and wrote a memoir titled Out of My Mind that included short stories previously published in the Junior League magazine.

== Personal life ==
In 1936, she married Henry Bond Webb, an editor of the Durham Morning Herald. They had two daughters, Carol and Marion. The family lived in a house in Durham's Forest Hills Historic District.

Webb was a member of the Junior League of Durham and Orange Counties, Hope Valley Country Club, the Friends of the Durham Public Library, The Tourist Club, The North Caroliniana Society, The North Carolina Writers Conference, and the Three Arts Club.

A devout Episcopalian, she attended both St. Philip's Episcopal Church and St. Stephen's Episcopal Church.

Webb died on May 23, 2012, at the Hillcrest Convalescent Center in Durham.
