= Hope Valley Historic District =

Hope Valley Historic District may refer to:

in the United States

- Hope Valley Historic District (Durham, North Carolina), listed on the NRHP in North Carolina
- Hope Valley Historic District (Hopkinton, Rhode Island), listed on the NRHP in Rhode Island
