= William Bishop =

William Bishop, or variants, may refer to:

== American politicians ==
- William S. Bishop (c.1804–1863), New York state legislator
- William Bishop (politician) (1817–1879), Missouri state treasurer, 1865–1869
- William D. Bishop (1827–1904), Connecticut congressman
- William E. Bishop, member of the New Jersey General Assembly

== Sportsmen ==
- Bill Bishop (1880s pitcher) (1869–1932), American baseball player for Pittsburgh Alleghenys and Chicago White Stockings
- Bill Bishop (1920s pitcher) (1900–1956), American baseball player for Philadelphia Athletics
- Bill Bishop (American football) (1931–1998), American defensive lineman in NFL
- Willie Bishop, New Zealand rugby footballer who won 2000 Junior Sportsperson of the Year award
- Will Bishop, American ice hockey defenseman for Saginaw Spirit in 2024 Memorial Cup

== Writers ==
- William Bishop (bishop) (c.1553–1624), English Catholic author of religious works
- William Henry Bishop (1847–1928), American novelist and travel writer
- William Warner Bishop (1871–1955), American librarian and writer on cataloging
- William John Bishop (1903–1961), English librarian, editor and medical historian
- Bill Bishop (author) (born 1953), American journalist and social commentator

== Others ==
- William Bishop (gun seller) (1797–1871), English gun-shop owner in London
- Billy Bishop (1894–1956), Canadian flying ace of World War I
- William Bishop (actor) (1918–1959), American stage, film and TV performer
- William Bradford Bishop (born 1936), American diplomat charged with murder of his family
- Bill Bishop (businessman) (1958–2018), American real estate developer and murder victim

== Characters ==
- Col. William Bishop in 2011 video game Ace Combat: Assault Horizon
