= George Watts Carr =

American architect

- Born: April 13, 1893; Durham, North Carolina, U.S.
- Died: July 17, 1975 (aged 82); Durham, North Carolina, U.S.
- Resting place: Maplewood Cemetery
- Education: Davidson College
- Occupation: architect
- Spouse: Amy Winston
- Relatives: George Washington Watts (uncle); Sata Virginia Ecker Watts (aunt); Robert W. Winston (father-in-law)

George Watts Carr (April 13, 1893 – July 17, 1975) was an American architect who was known for his commercial and residential designs throughout North Carolina. He designined many of the houses in Durham's affluent Forest Hills and Hope Valley neighborhoods, including the Mary Duke Biddle Estate and the Hubert Teer House.

== Early life, family, and education ==
Carr was born on April 13, 1893 in Durham, North Carolina, to Louis Albert Carr and Clara Louise Watts Carr. His parents moved from Maryland to Durham around 1888, following Carr's maternal uncle, the industrialist and philanthropist George Washington Watts. Carr grew up in the affluent Morehead Hill neighborhood, next door to his uncle's mansion, Harwood Hall.

He attended Durham High School and Davidson College.

== Career ==
Carr designed the Hill Building, the Carolina Inn, Durham Athletic Park, the Mary Duke Biddle Estate, the Hubert Teer House, Whitehall Terrace, ECU Health Bertie Hospital, Northern High School, and the parish house for St. Philip's Episcopal Church. He also worked on Montrose and the clubhouse at Hope Valley Country Club. His firm also designed the Snow Building.

== Personal life and death ==
In 1916, Carr married Amy Winston, daughter of Robert W. Winston, at Christ Episcopal Church in Raleigh, North Carolina. Their children included George Watts Carr Jr. and Robert W. Carr.

Carr died in Durham on July 17, 1975. He was buried in Maplewood Cemetery.
