= David Paton (architect) =

Scottish architect and builder

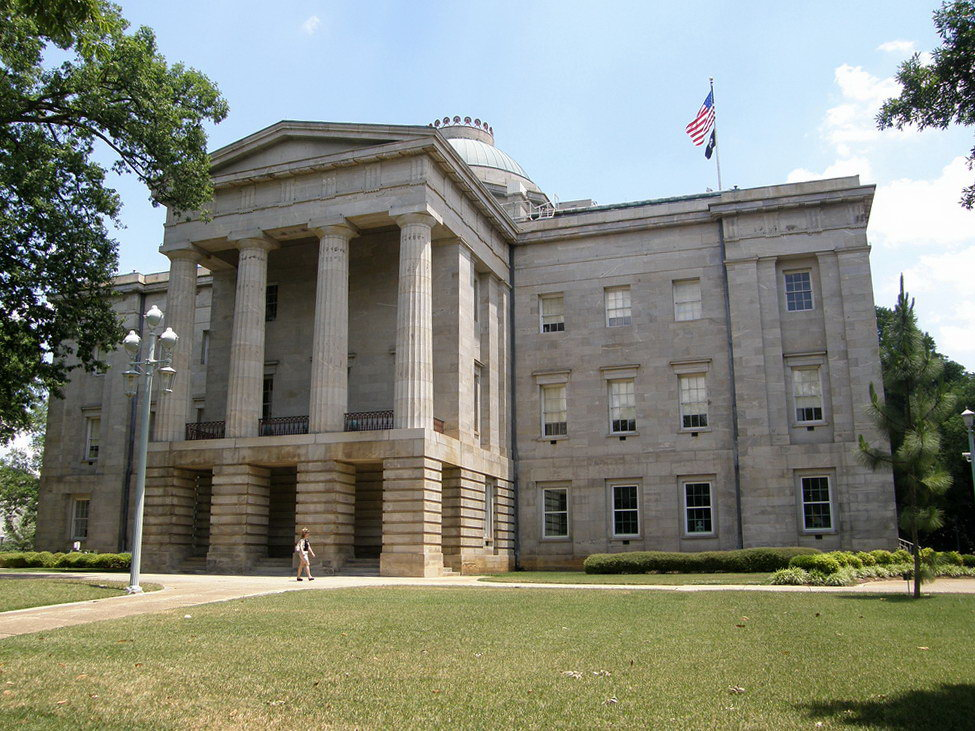
North Carolina State Capitol

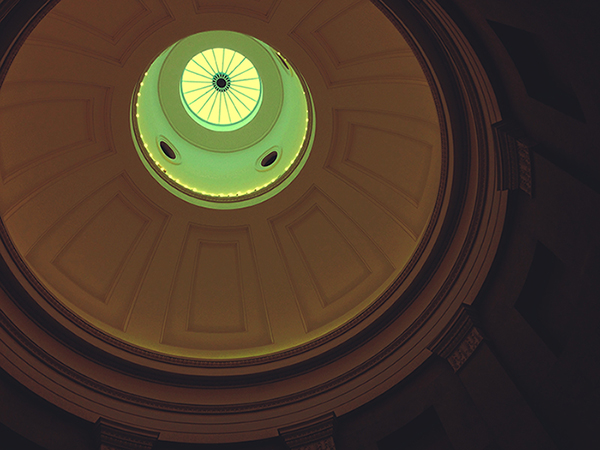
North Carolina State Capitol: Interior view of Paton's dome

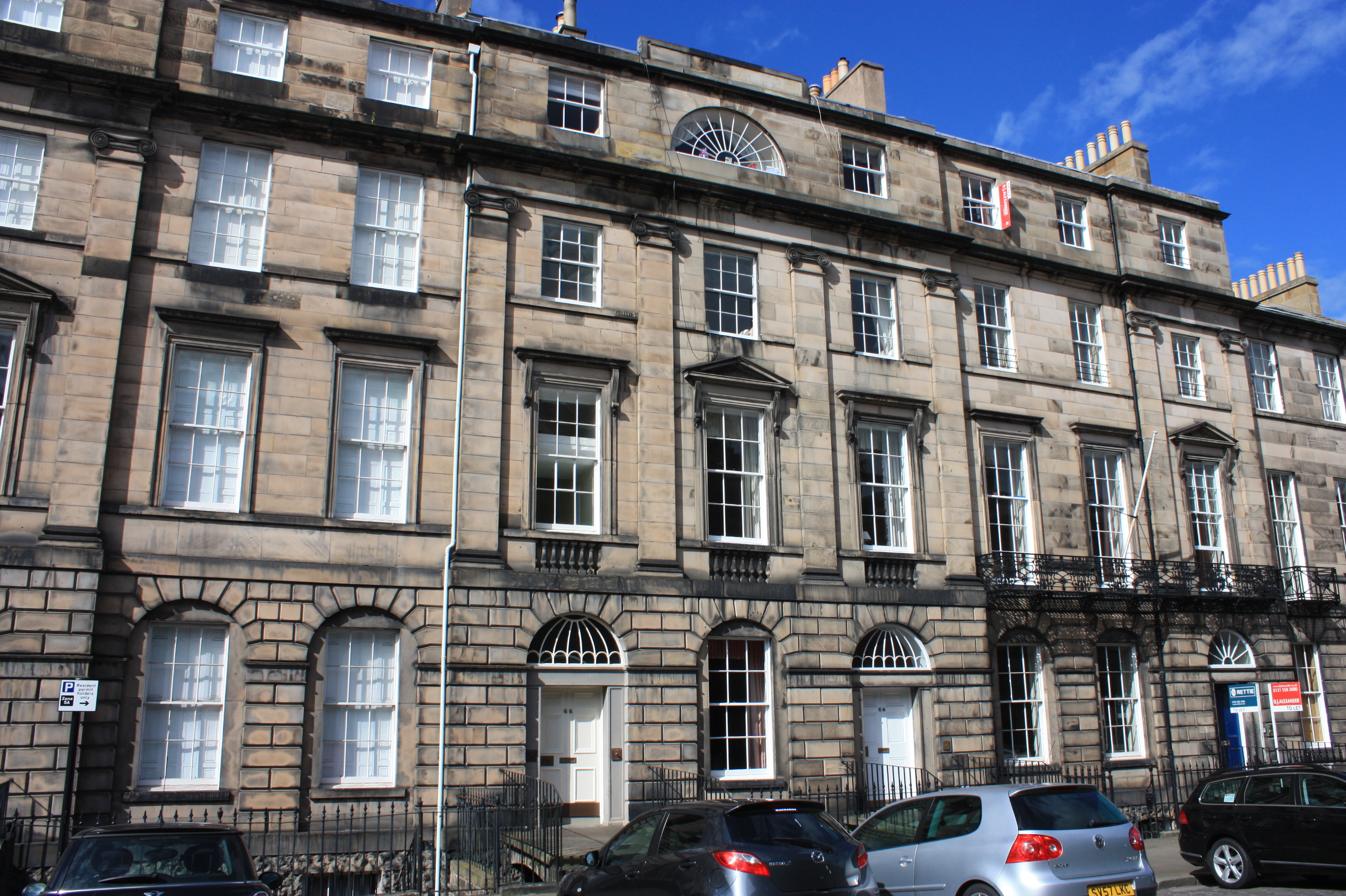
The magnificent Paton family home at 66 Great King Street, Edinburgh

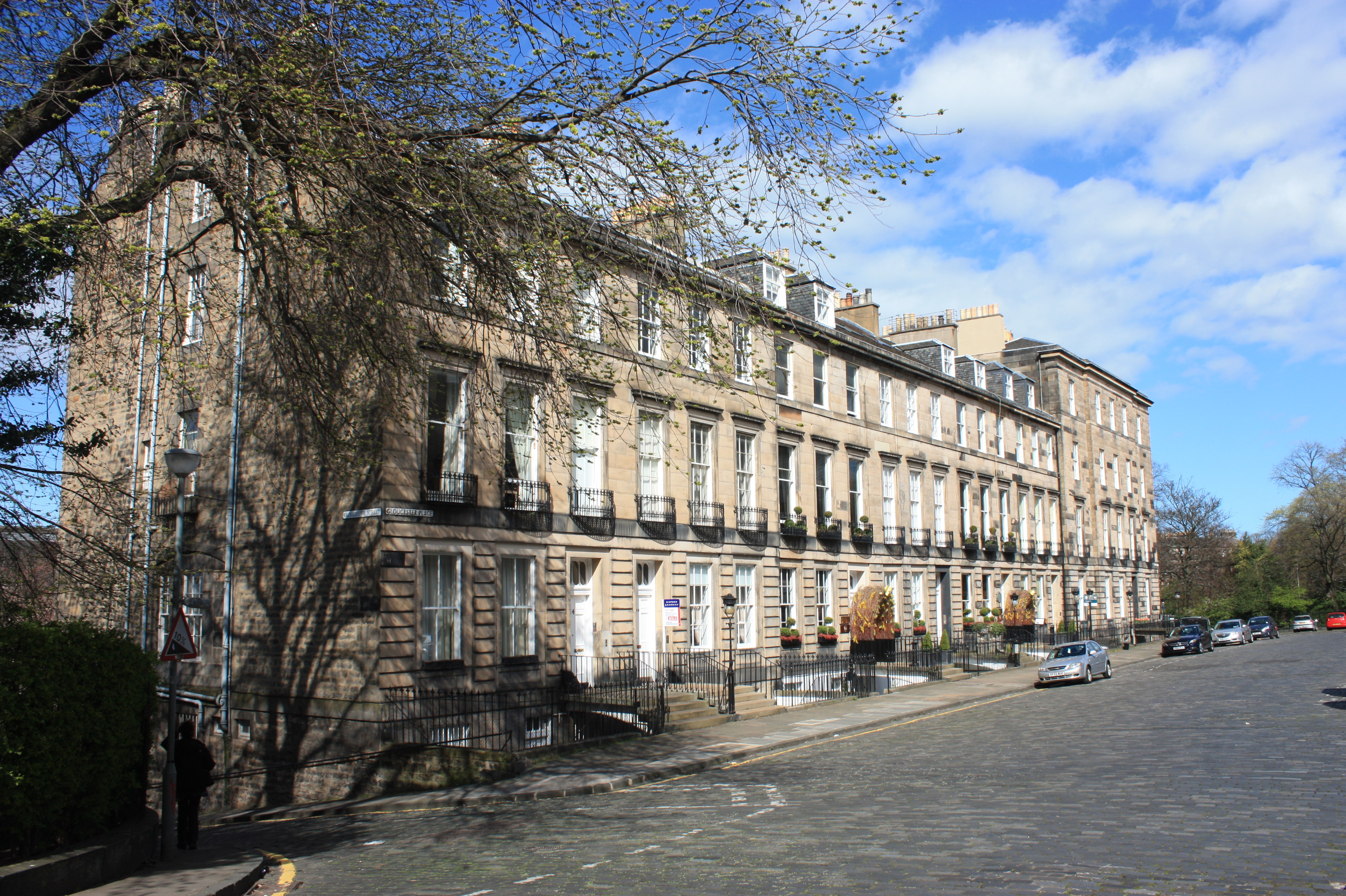
4 to 14 Gloucester Place, Edinburgh by David Paton

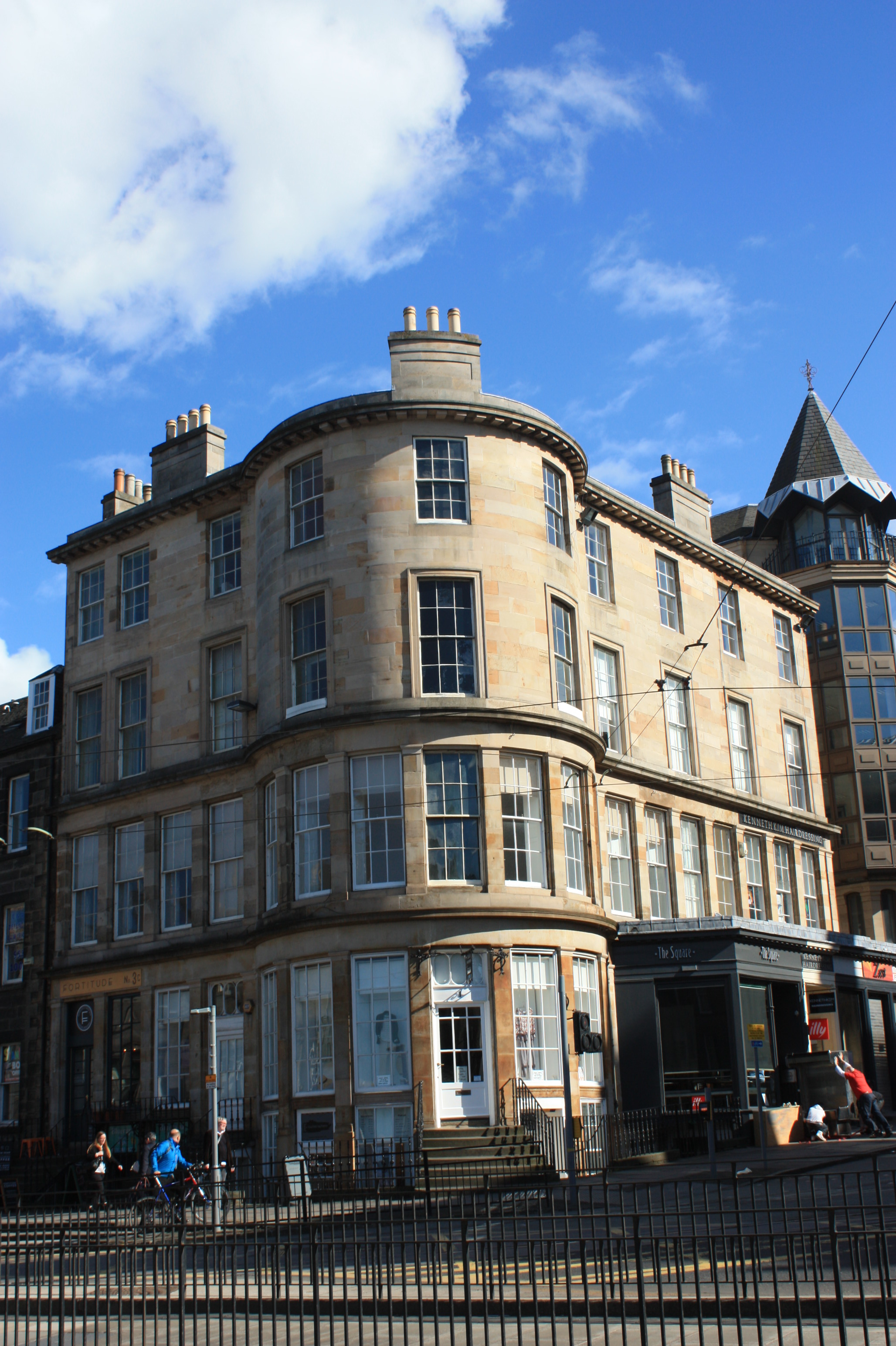
The unusual double height shopfront on David Paton's York Place building in Edinburgh

David Paton (1801 – 1882) was a Scottish architect and builder, who temporarily worked in the United States in the 1830s and was important in his role of supervising the completion of the North Carolina State Capitol. He returned to the United States in 1849 to teach architecture and remained for the rest of his life.

== Life ==
He was born in Edinburgh the third child of twelve to John Paton, builder and Elenor Roper Paton. His father was the builder of much of Edinburgh's Second New Town. He attended Edinburgh University before training as an architect and builder. In 1825 he appears to have travelled to Paris in France as several of his drawings from this period survive.

On 23 January 1829 he married Mary Nichol in Edinburgh. They had one daughter, Eleanor Murray Paton (1830-1902). However the marriage was short-lived as his wife died early in 1833.

In November 1829 he went to London where he worked in the offices of Sir John Soane for six months. When he returned his family lived at his father's huge house within the central north “palace-block” pavilion, at 66 Great King Street, in Edinburgh's Second New Town. This house was built by his father, who had constructed most of Great King Street, and this huge house was partly in lieu of payment.

In July 1833, following the death of his wife, he travelled to the United States, arriving, as was the norm, in New York City. It is likely that he left his young daughter at the family home with his parents.

On arrival in New York he sought employment, and found such in the offices of Ithiel Town and Alexander Jackson Davis, jointly known as Town & Davis. Due to his great experience with the construction of fine-jointed, stone-built Neo-Classical buildings they readily employed him and sent him as overseeing job architect to their new commission on the construction of North Carolina State Capitol. Town and Davis had taken over this prestigious commission following their submission of plans to the state regarding the project. The project was already on site, following a design by William Nichols, but Town & Davis managed to usurp Nichols to obtain the commission. Paton reached Raleigh on 16 September 1834, to oversee the construction, at which stage the outer walls were virtually complete. Paton seemingly offended Town by making many alterations to the design without Town's authority. Town & Davis officially withdrew from the project and in March 1835 the commissioners officially appointed Paton as the architect in his own, independent capacity. The project was truly massive, and Paton had control of up to 330 construction workers at any given time.

Paton made many adaptions to the interior plan-form and roof, many adopting specifically Scottish building techniques, such as the cantilevered “pen-checked” stone stairs. He also borrowed some ideas from his time with John Soane in the form of top-lit corridors and use of balconies. He created an open-gallery beneath the dome, to form an amazingly dramatic full-height space viewing up to the underside of the dome. The interior was more functional than originally planned but at the same time more spatially sophisticated and dramatic. The dome itself was executed in very simple coffers, reminiscent of its Greek inspiration.

In 1835 he is recorded as having met William Bell, a likewise Scottish architect far from home, in a quarry at East Chester near New York and developed a friendship. He later suggested Bell for a commission for the state arsenal at Fayetteville, North Carolina which stood Bell employment for almost three decades.

On 2 August 1837 Paton married for the second time: Diana (‘’Anna’’) Bertie Gaskin Farrow of Washington, North Carolina. They had one son and seven daughters.

On 23 May 1840 Paton was dismissed by the commissioners of the Capitol just prior to its completion. At the time of its opening ceremony he was en route to New York with his family. This would have been a highly unsatisfactory climax to 6 years of work. Paton's dismissal was apparently over unpaid bills for his services. Despite years of making claims, the sums owed were never paid to Paton.

In 1841 Paton returned to Scotland setting up office at 32 Dundas Street in Edinburgh. In 1845 he relocated to 3 Trinity Crescent, in the north of the city. During this period he once again lived with his father at 66 Great King Street in the centre of the Second New Town.

In 1847 he applied to replace Thomas Brown as City Superintendent of Works for Edinburgh. He failed in this bid and the job went to Brown's former assistant, David Cousin. His return to Scotland did not prove fruitful. He also did not inherit as much on his wealthy father's death as he had anticipated.

In 1849 he returned to the United States. Thereafter he appears to have been employed teaching architecture and building practice in Brooklyn until disabled by a stroke in 1875. In 1878 he declined a commission to design the governor's mansion in North Carolina and the job instead passed to Samuel Sloan.

He died on 25 March 1882 in Brooklyn, New York. He is buried in Cypress Hills National Cemetery.

== Principal works ==
See

- 4-8 St Vincent Street, Edinburgh (1821)
- 4-14 Gloucester Place, Edinburgh (1822) (possibly guided by Thomas Bonnar
- Summerfield House, Edinburgh (1824)
- 1-3 York Place, Edinburgh (1824)
- 2-18 St Stephen Street/23,24 North West Circus Place, Edinburgh (1825)
- 59-73 Cumberland Street, Edinburgh (c.1830)
- 25-29 Dundas street, Edinburgh (c.1830)
- North Carolina State Capitol (1833–40) overseeing the design of Ithiel Town plus adapting many elements of the design to a more refined Neo-Classical form
- The Caldwell Institute (a Presbyterian School) in Greensboro, North Carolina (1835) – pro bono
- Alterations to University of North Carolina buildings at Chapel Hill (1839)
