= Village Hearth =

LGBTQ retirement community in Durham, North Carolina

- Durham neighborhood
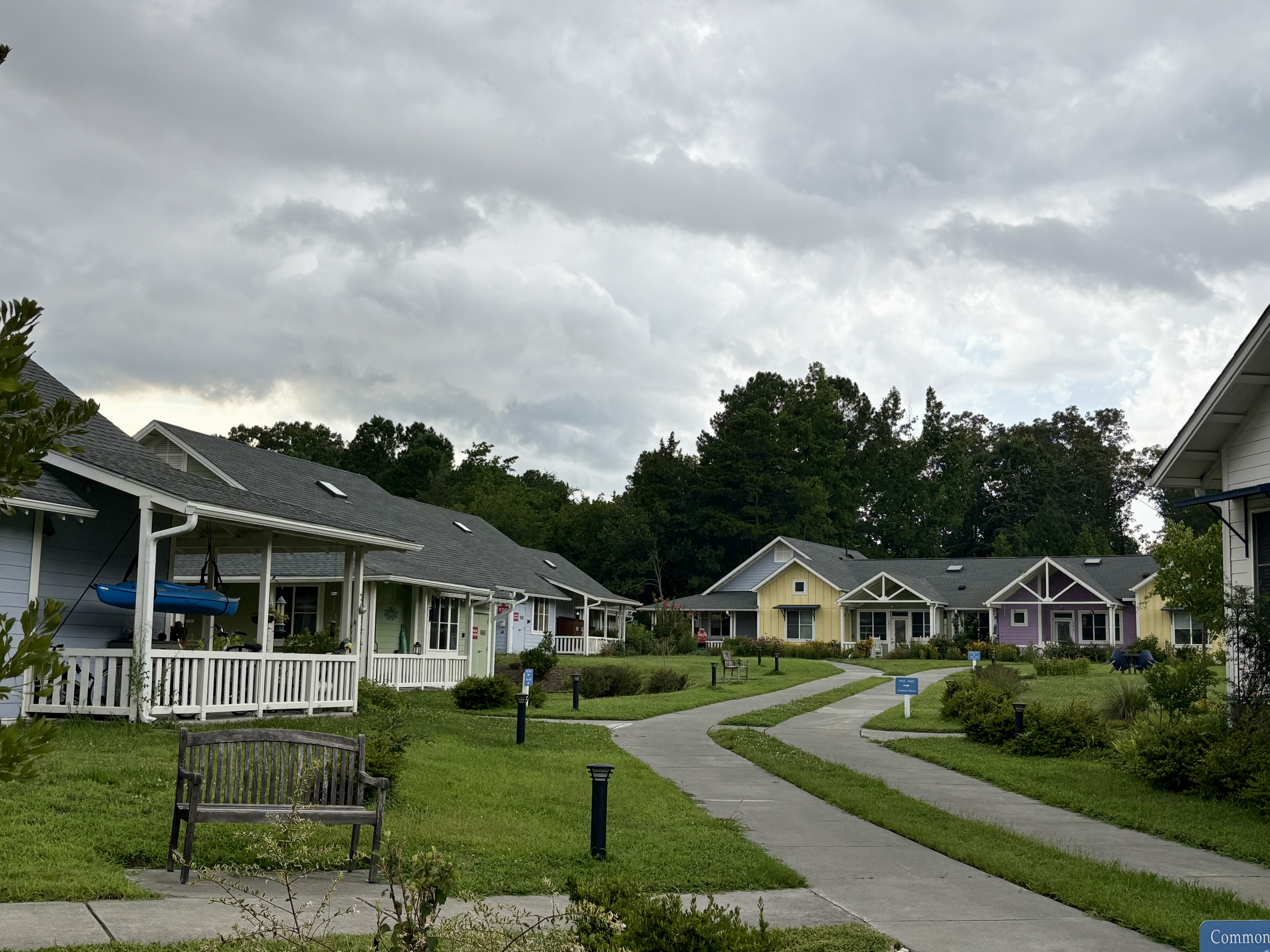
- The village in 2025
- Interactive map of Village Hearth
- Coordinates: 36°04′46″N 78°53′18″W
- Country: United States
- State: North Carolina
- City: Durham
- Time zone: EST
- Website: villagehearthcohousing.com

Village Hearth Cohousing is a gay village and retirement community in Durham, North Carolina. It is one of the first cohousing developments for LGBTQ+ people in the United States.

== History ==
Village Hearth was established in 2019 by Margaret Roesch and Pat McAulay. The village consists of twenty-eight single story pastel cottages. The cottages are individually owned and connected by walking paths and gardens. Development began in October 2019 after a $5.65 million construction loan was provided by National Cooperative Bank. The houses were designed by Charles Durrett of McCamant and Durrett Architects and Kathryn McCamant. A 2,600-square-foot common house sits in the middle of the village. The common house includes a large dining room, a kitchen, an office, laundry facilities, and rooms for arts, crafts and exercise.

The village provides housing for LGBTQ people who are fifty-five and older. It is one of the first cohousing developments for LGBTQ people in the United States.
