= St. Joseph's African Methodist Episcopal Church =

Historic church in North Carolina, United States

- U.S. National Register of Historic Places
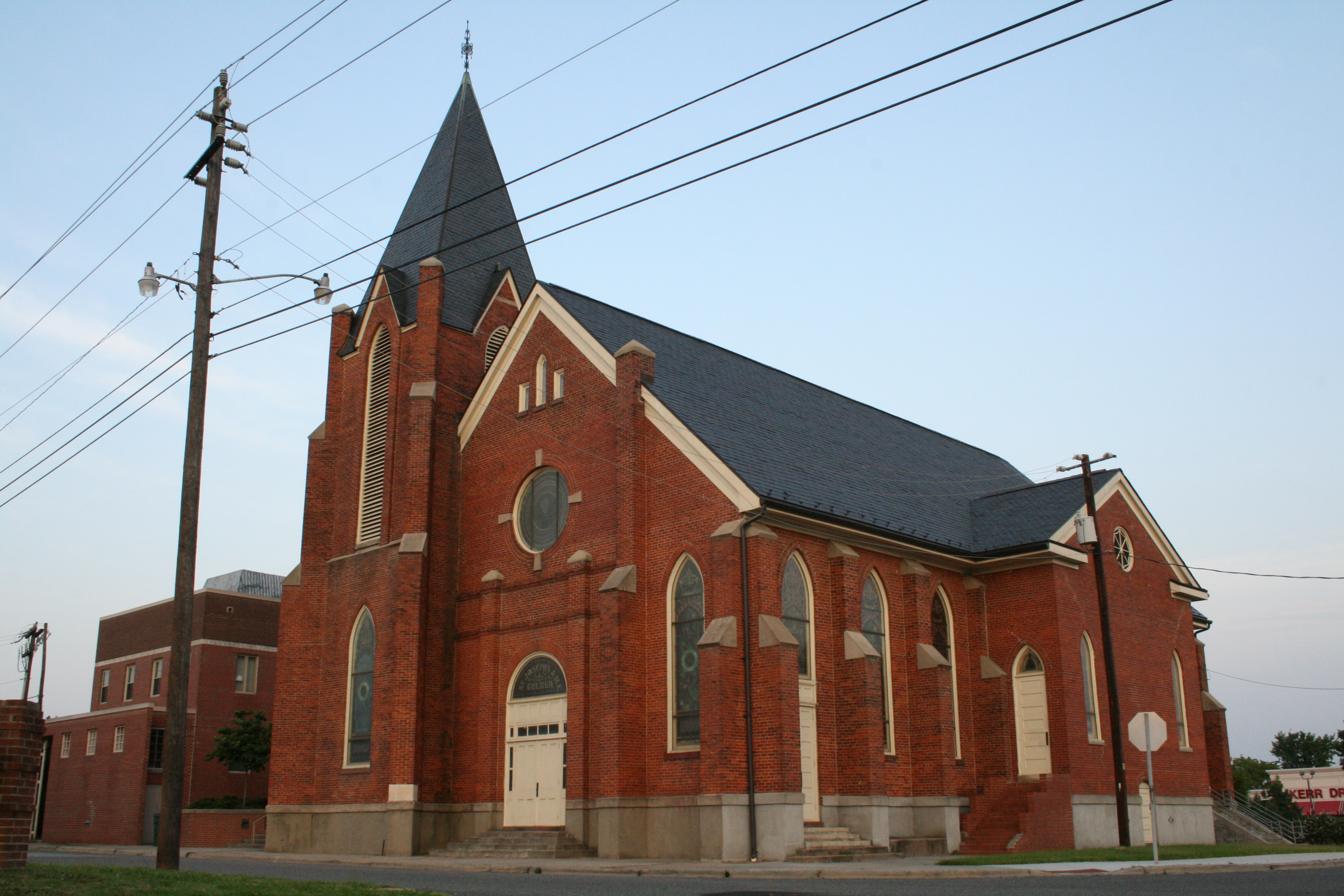

- Location within North Carolina Location within the United States
- Location: Fayetteville St. and Durham Expwy., Durham, North Carolina
- Coordinates: 35°59′11″N 78°53′53″W
- Area: 1.5 acres (0.61 ha)
- Built: 1891
- Architect: Leary, Samuel L.
- Architectural style: Late Victorian, Eclectic
- NRHP reference No.: 76001319
- Added to NRHP: August 11, 1976

St. Joseph's African Methodist Episcopal Church is a historic African Methodist Episcopal church building located at Fayetteville Street and Durham Expressway in the Hayti District, now a neighborhood of Durham, Durham County, North Carolina.

== History ==
Started soon after the American Civil War by black workers, the Hayti District became a well-developed and self-sufficient black community, complete with a variety of businesses and services, including theatre, hospital and hotel.

The church was built in 1891, by a congregation that had organized in 1869, brought together in meetings in a "brush arbor" organized by Edian Markham, a former slave and AME missionary. After building a couple of wooden structures, the congregation raised money for this brick church, including funds donated by white philanthropists.

Edian Markham is buried in Geer Cemetery.

It was added to the National Register of Historic Places in 1976.

It is now used by the St. Joseph Historic Foundation as the Hayti Heritage Centre for cultural and community activities.
