= Braggtown, Durham, North Carolina =

Neighborhood in Durham, North Carolina

Coordinates: 36°02′06″N 78°53′31″W

Braggtown Bragtown
- Durham neighborhood
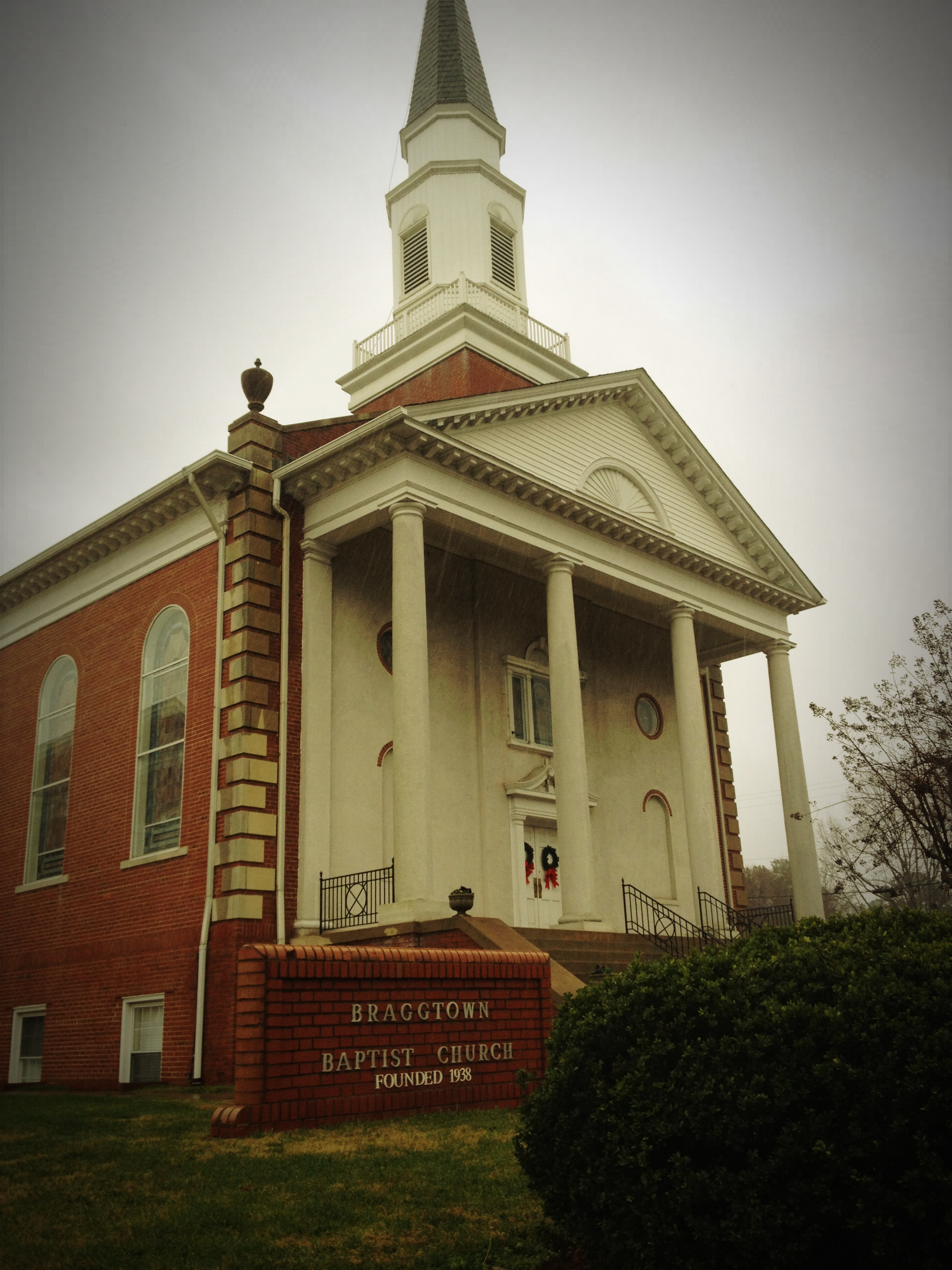
- Braggtown Baptist Church
- Interactive map of Braggtown
- Country: United States
- State: North Carolina
- City: Durham
- Time zone: EST

Bragtown (or Braggtown) is a neighborhood located in the northeastern corner of Durham, North Carolina. The community is centered on N. Roxboro Street (Business US-501) and the Old Oxford Highway. The area has been within the Durham city limits since the 1950s.

Branford Marsalis, the noted jazz saxophonist, named his 2006 album Braggtown after the neighborhood; Marsalis has been a resident of the Durham area for the past few years.
