= Hubert Teer House =

House in Durham, North Carolina

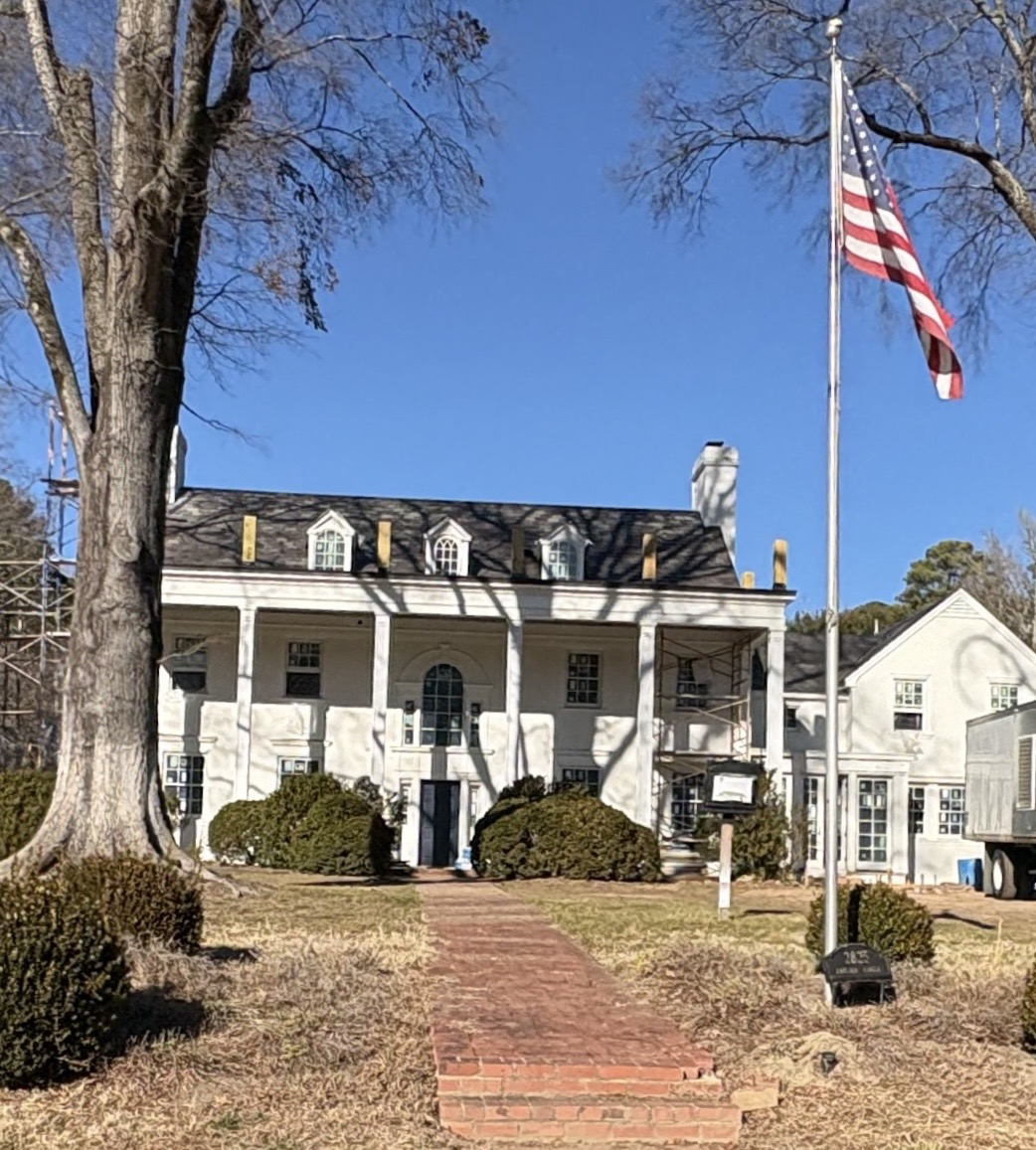
- The house undergoing renovations in January 2026
- Interactive map of the Hubert Teer House area

General information
- Status: Active
- Type: private residence
- Architectural style: Colonial Revival
- Location: 2825 Chelsea Circle; Durham, North Carolina, U.S.
- Completed: 1932
- Owner: Teer family

Design and construction
- Architect: George Watts Carr

The Hubert Teer House, also known as the Hubert and Mary Teer House, is a mansion in the Hope Valley Historic District in Durham, North Carolina.

== History ==
The house was commissioned by construction magnate Hubert Teer and his wife, Mary Teer, in 1932 and designed by the architect George Watts Carr. The builder was George Kane. The home, built in the Colonial Revival style, is located in Hope Valley Historic District. It sits on a 1.7-acre lot along Hope Valley Country Club's golf course. It features a two-storey portico across a five-bay façade and a neoclassical entrance with a Palladian window.

After Teer's death, the house passed to his daughter, Mary Teer Barringer. It underwent remodeling in 1997. A miniature version of the house, built as a play house for Hubert Teer's daughter, sits on the property.
