= Wiley and Elizabeth Forbus House =

Historic house in North Carolina, United States

- U.S. National Register of Historic Places
- U.S. Historic district – Contributing property
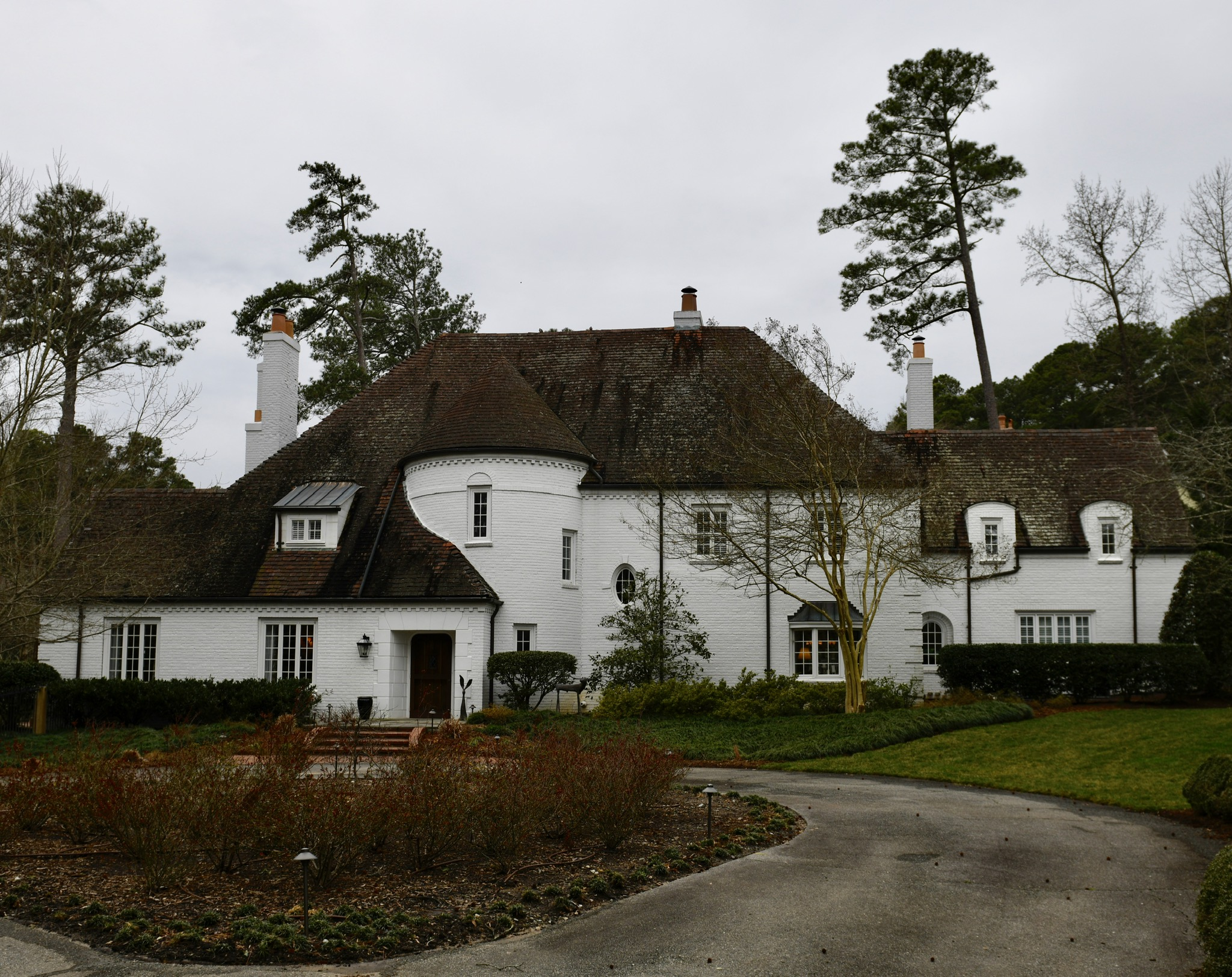

- Location within North Carolina Location within the United States
- Location: 3307 Devon Rd. Durham, North Carolina
- Coordinates: 35°57′7″N 78°57′11″W
- Area: 1.3 acres (0.53 ha)
- Built: 1931-1933
- Architect: Nelson, G. Murray; Nelson & Cooper, et al.
- Architectural style: Late 19th And 20th Century Revivals, Norman Provincial
- Part of: Hope Valley Historic District (ID09001105)
- MPS: Durham MRA
- NRHP reference No.: 05000348
- Added to NRHP: April 28, 2005

Wiley and Elizabeth Forbus House is a historic home located at Durham, Durham County, North Carolina. It was built between 1931 and 1933, and is a two-story, Norman Provincial-style brick dwelling. It consists of a central hip-roofed block flanked by side gabled wings. It features a two-story tower with conical roof on the main block.

It was listed on the National Register of Historic Places in 2005. It is located in the Hope Valley Historic District.
