= Mary Duke Biddle Estate =

Historic house in North Carolina, United States

- U.S. National Register of Historic Places
- U.S. Historic district – Contributing property
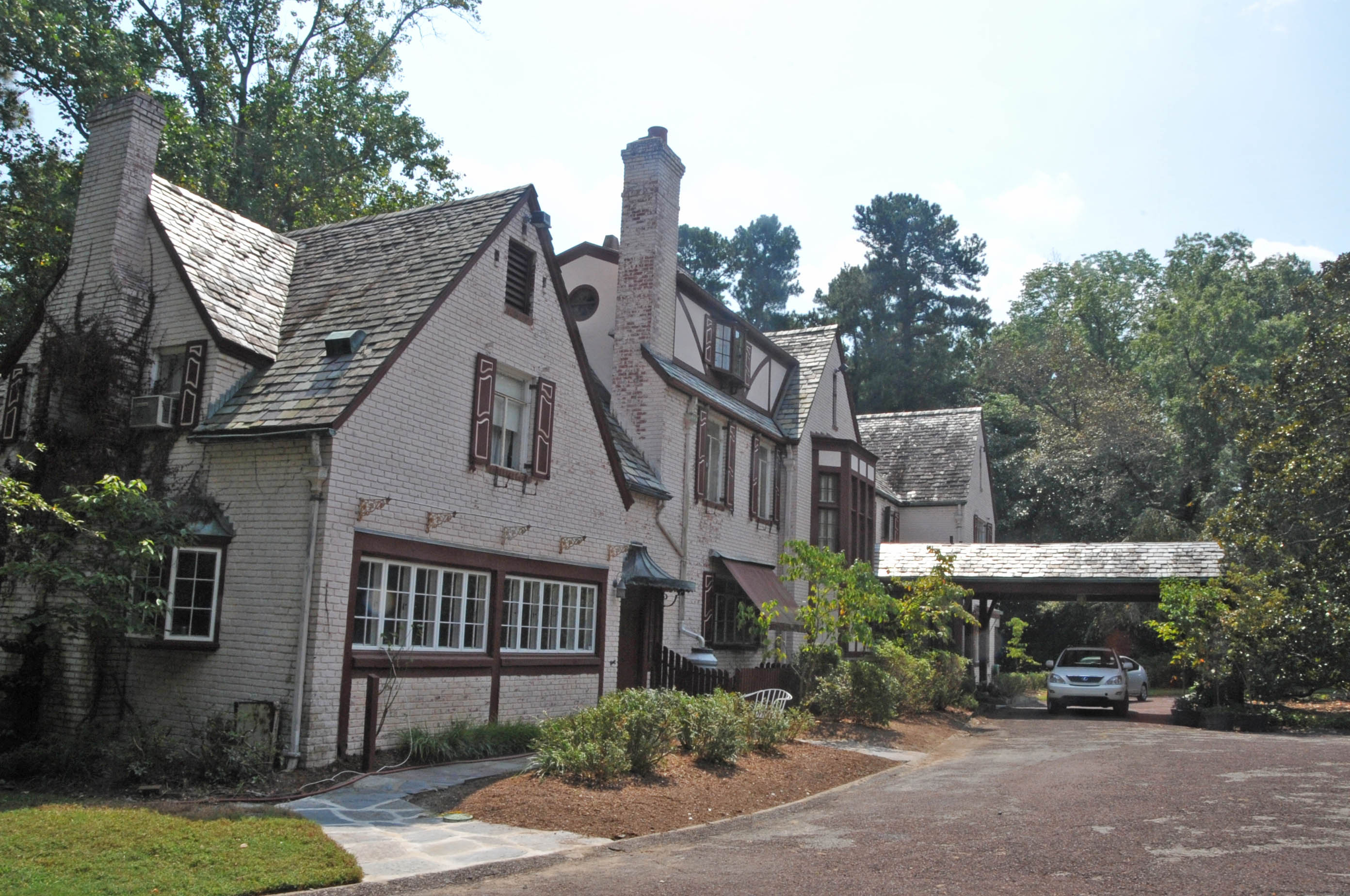
- Mary Duke Biddle Estate, March 2007

- Location within North Carolina Location within the United States
- Location: 1044 & 1050 W. Forest Hills Blvd., Durham, North Carolina
- Coordinates: 35°58′59″N 78°55′09″W
- Area: 8.562 acres (3.465 ha)
- Built: 1927, 1935-1958
- Architect: George Watts Carr; Karl Bock
- Architectural style: Tudor Revival, Modern Movement, Moderne, Classical Revival, French Eclectic
- NRHP reference No.: 12001157
- Added to NRHP: August 5, 2011

Mary Duke Biddle Estate, also known as the James O. Cobb House and Pinecrest, is a historic home and estate located at Durham, Durham County, North Carolina. The main house "Pinecrest" is a Tudor Revival style dwelling built in 1927, with additions and interior renovations made between 1935 and 1958. These additions and renovations included Colonial Revival, French Eclectic, Oriental, Art Moderne, and Art Deco elements. The estate property includes an additional three contributing outbuildings and nine contributing structures. They are The Cottage, a gasoline pump, iron picket fence with two ornamental gates, two large brick arches, stone-lined grottoes, bathhouse, tennis court, a swimming pool, a stone fireplace, pergola, a gardener's cottage with an attached greenhouse, and a storage garage. The estate was the home of philanthropist Mary Duke Biddle from 1935 until her death in 1960.

After Mary Duke Biddle's death, the house was owned by noted philanthropist Mary Duke Biddle Trent Semans and her husband, James H. Semans, who gave the house to their son, James D.B.T. Semans in 1976.

It was listed on the National Register of Historic Places in 2013. Pinecrest and some of the contributing resources are included in the Forest Hills Historic District.

In July 2023, the house located at 1415 Bivins St. was burned down as part of a training exercise by the Durham Fire Department, to make room for a proposed housing development.
