= John C. and Binford Carr House =

Historic house in North Carolina, United States

- U.S. National Register of Historic Places
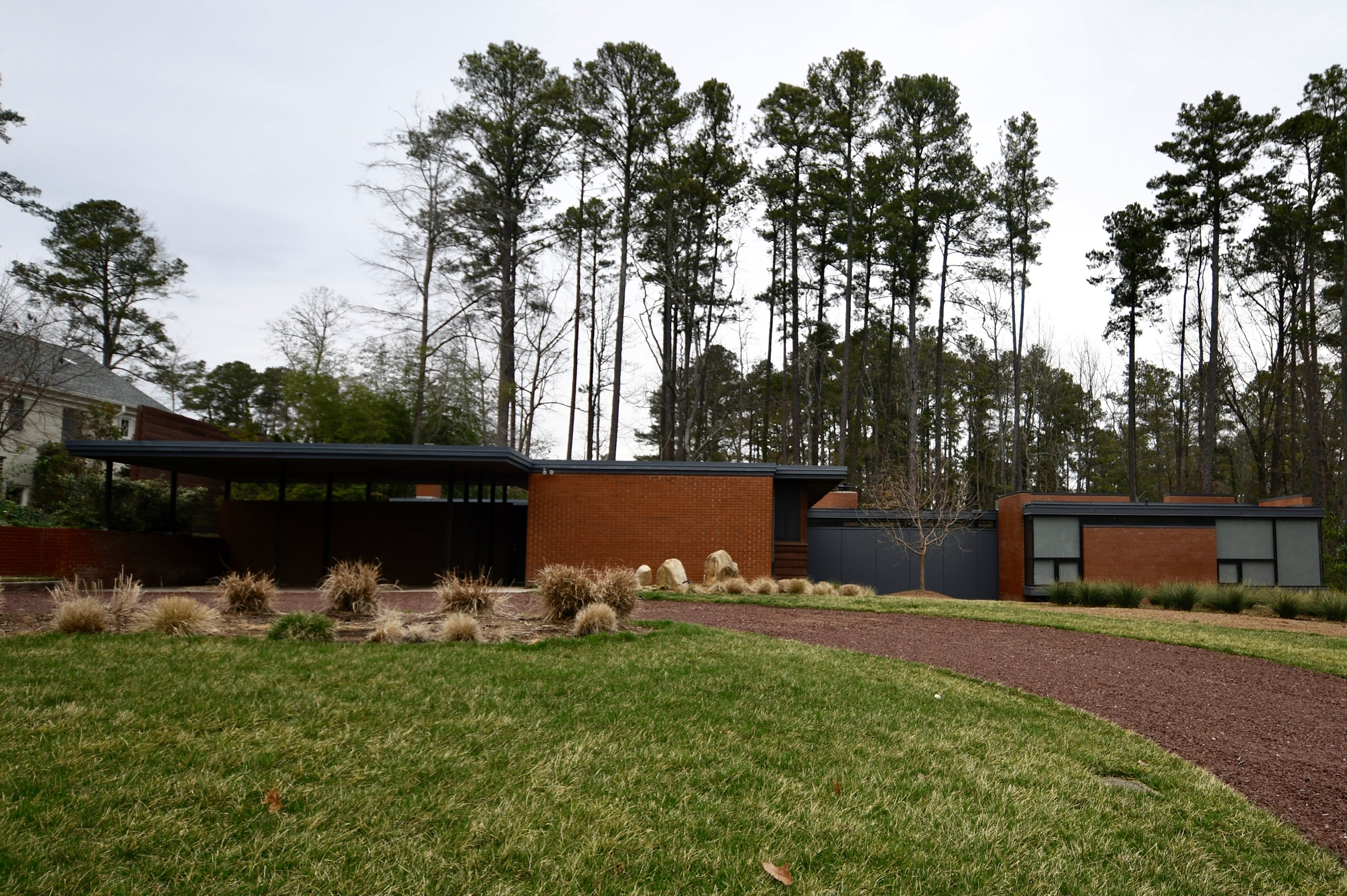

- Location within North Carolina Location within the United States
- Location: 3400 Westover Rd. Durham, North Carolina
- Coordinates: 35°56′48″N 78°57′22″W
- Area: .69 acres (0.28 ha)
- Built: 1958
- Built by: Walser, Frank
- Architect: Scott, Kenneth C.
- Architectural style: Modern Movement
- NRHP reference No.: 11000508
- Added to NRHP: August 5, 2011

John C. and Binford Carr House is a historic home located in the Hope Valley Historic District of Durham, North Carolina. It was built in 1958, and is a one-story, T-shaped brick, steel, and glass Modern Movement-style dwelling with a flat roof. It originally had 2,337 square feet and employs a Japanese aesthetic with a courtyard plan, a copper door with a simple copper appliqué design, and two sets of Shoji rice paper doors.

Binford Carr sold the property in December 2009 to Mark and Mimi Hansen. She also sold these new owners an empty, buildable lot next to the house. The Hansens and the owners of the adjacent property to the east purchased the lot together, and divided it into two lots to make it unbuildable, thus protecting it from development. The Binford-Carr house now sits on .699 acres.

The Binford-Carr house was listed on the National Register of Historic Places in 2011.
