= Snow Building =

Building in Durham, North Carolina

- The Snow Building in 2019

General information
- Status: Completed
- Type: Multiuse
- Architectural style: Art Deco
- Location: 335 West Main Street; Durham, North Carolina, U.S.
- Coordinates: 35.9965°N 78.9037°W
- Completed: 1930

Design and construction
- Architects: Northrup & O'Brien and George Watts Carr

The Snow Building is a historic Art Deco skyscraper in Durham, North Carolina. It is located in Five Points, within the Downtown Durham Historic District. It was named after Anna Exum Snow, who commissioned the building.

== History ==
The Snow Building was constructed in 1930, designed by the architects Northrup & O'Brien and George Watts Carr and built by George W. Kane. Anna Exum Snow, for whom it is named, commissioned the building to be built. It was built as part of the second wave of commercial structures in downtown Durham's Five Points area.

The building includes office spaces, retail spaces, restaurants, and luxury penthouse apartments

Arcana Bar and Lounge, the city's only lesbian bar registered with the Lesbian Bar Project, is located in the basement of the building. Other tenants include the British-Indian restaurant Viceroy and the French bar Soif.

In 2016, the building was sold for nearly $3.6 million.
