= Whitehall Terrace =

Mansion in Durham, North Carolina

Coordinates: 36°0′43.7364″N 78°53′33.4926″W

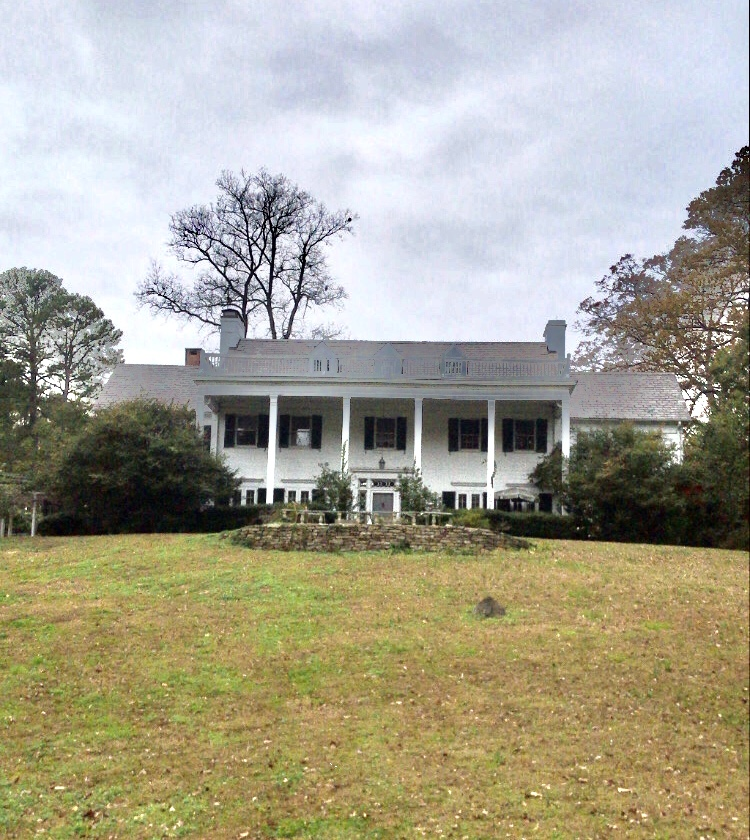
- Whitehall Terrace in 2020
- Interactive map of the Whitehall Terrace area

General information
- Status: active
- Type: private residence
- Architectural style: Colonial Revival
- Location: 105 West Knox Street; Durham, North Carolina, U.S.
- Completed: 1929

Design and construction
- Architect: George Watts Carr

Whitehall Terrace, also known as the Richard H. Wright II House, is a Colonial Revival mansion in Durham, North Carolina. Completed in 1929, it was built for businessman Richard H. Wright II and his wife, Mary Scalon Wright. Whitehall Terrace was one of the first houses constructed on the north side of Durham's Duke Park neighborhood. Recognized as a historic landmark by the Durham City-County Planning Department and the Durham Architectural and Historic Inventory, it was included in Duke Park's nomination to the National Register of Historic Places.

== History ==
Whitehall Terrace was commissioned in the 1920s by businessman Richard H. Wright II. The son of Thomas Davenport Wright and Elizabeth Wright, a socialite who founded the Debutante Cotillion and Christmas Ball of Durham, he was the president of the Wright Real Estate Company. A prominent businessman, Wright was also the president and treasurer of the Allenton Company, vice president of the Southern Fire Insurance Company, director of the Randolph Cotton Mills, vice president of the Public Hardware Company, president and director of the Durham Telephone Company, director of the Durham Bank and Trust Company, director of Family Service Incorporated, and a trustee of Louisburg College. A gentleman farmer, he also operated the 1500-acre Snow Hill Farm at Stagville Plantation. Wright had inherited the land from his uncle, tobacco and utilities magnate Richard H. Wright, and was responsible for much of the development of the Duke Park neighborhood. Construction on Whitehall Terrace began in the 1920s and was completed in 1929.

The house was designed by architect George Watts Carr. Noted for its similarity to Mount Vernon, it has been considered one of the most elaborate examples of Colonial Revival architecture in Durham and, at the time it was built, was the largest home in the neighborhood. It is located on the corner of Mangum Street and Knox Street in the affluent Duke Park neighborhood, a suburb of downtown Durham. Built in the Colonial Revival style, featuring a symmetrical façade and two-story portico, it was one of the first houses on the north end of the Duke Park. The architecture includes Neoclassical cornices and molded lintels above the French doors opening onto the front patio. The entrance has a curved pediment decorated with modillions and foliate plasterwork. The central hall leads to a large porch and parterre overlooking Mangum Street. On the south side of the house is a music room, formal living room, library, and a swimming pool and terrace. On the north side of the house is a formal dining room, sitting room, and breakfast room. A small guest house is also located on the property. The garage is connected to the main house by a curved arcade. Additions were made in 1940, including a new kitchen on the ground floor and more bedrooms upstairs, which doubled the size of the house to 6,000 square feet.

Wright lived in the home with his wife Mary Scanlon Wright, the daughter of the minister of First Presbyterian Church, and their three daughters, Turissa, Elizabeth, and Mary. The wedding of their daughter, Elizabeth, and French anesthesiologist Michael Bourgeois-Gavardin took place at Whitehall Terrace in the 1950s.

On July 4, 1980 Whitehall Terrace was severely damaged in a fire. Wright and his wife died from injuries sustained after leaping out of their second-story bedroom window to escape the flames. The house passed to their daughters, who sold the property in 1981. Extensive restorations began after the sale. In 2004, Whitehall Terrace was featured as the designer show house of the Junior League of Durham and Orange Counties. The Junior League provided interior designers to redo the house, including Kate Strobl, Linda Dickerson, Dan Addison, Anne Aulbert, Stewart Woodard, and Minta Bell. In 2005 the sitting room, kitchen, and butler's pantry were redone by interior design firm Betsy Ross Design.

Whitehall Terrace is considered a historic landmark by the Durham City-County Planning Department and was included in Duke Park's nomination to the National Register of Historic Places. It received a citation of excellence in 1930 from the North Carolina Chapter of the American Institute of Architects. The house was included in the Durham Architectural and Historic Inventory in 1982. In 1991 Whitehall Terrace was awarded the Pyne Preservation Award by the Preservation Society of Durham and, in 2011, it was included in the society's house tour.

In 2016 Wade Marlette, a retired professor at North Carolina Central University and owner of Whitehall Terrace, opened the home for a fundraising reception to benefit the Durham and Piedmont Deanery of Catholic Charities USA.
