= Scarborough House =

Historic house in North Carolina, United States

- U.S. National Register of Historic Places
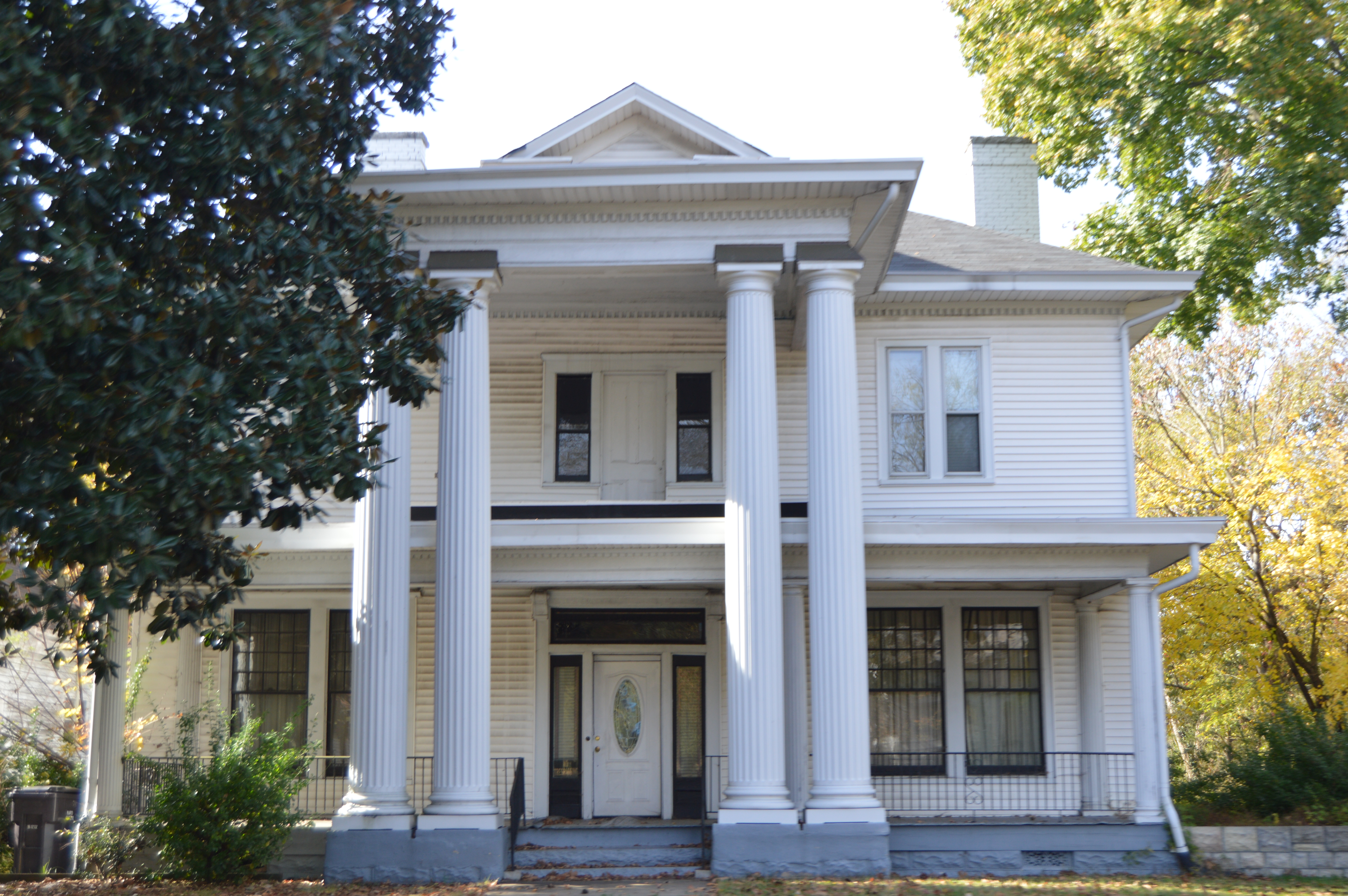
- Front of the house

- Location within North Carolina Location within the United States
- Location: 1406 Fayetteville St., Durham, North Carolina
- Coordinates: 35°58′49″N 78°54′00″W
- Area: 1.3 acres (0.53 ha)
- Built: 1916
- Architectural style: Classical Revival
- MPS: Durham MRA
- NRHP reference No.: 85001779
- Added to NRHP: August 9, 1985

Scarborough House is a historic home located in the Hayti neighborhood of Durham, Durham County, North Carolina. It was built in 1916, and consists of a cubical two-story, two-room-deep hip roofed main block, with a two-story hip-roofed rear ell. It features a Neoclassical style, two-story flat-roofed portico on paired Doric order columns. It was built by prosperous African-American funeral home owner J. C. Scarborourgh and his wife Daisy and many of the materials used for the house were salvaged by Scarborough from the 1880s Queen Anne Style Frank L. Fuller House which formerly stood in the 300 block of E. Main St.

It was listed on the National Register of Historic Places in 1985.
