= Southside–Saint Teresa =

Neighborhood in Durham, North Carolina, United States

Southside–Saint Teresa Southside / St. Teresa Saint Theresa Community Hillside Avenue / St. Teresa
- Durham neighborhood
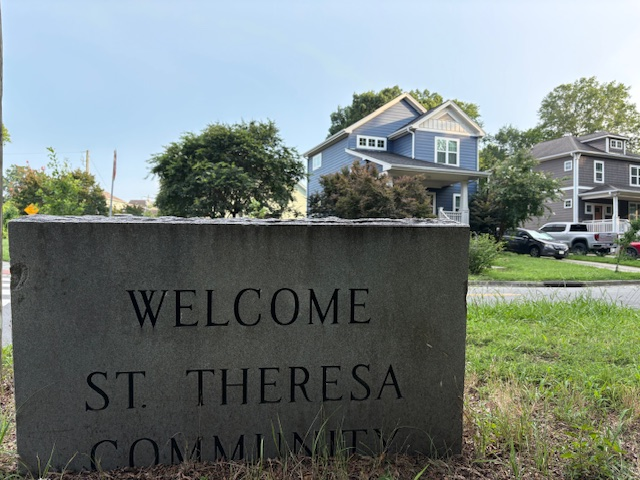
- Nickname(s): Southside; The Bottom
- Country: United States
- State: North Carolina
- City: Durham
- Named for: Teresa of Ávila
- Time zone: EST
- Website: sttheresacommunity.org

Southside–Saint Teresa (also written Southside / St. Teresa) is a historically African-American neighborhood in Durham, North Carolina. The neighborhood was originally known as The Bottom and later known as the St. Theresa Community. It is located on the south side of downtown Durham between Hayti and Forest Hills Historic District.

== History ==
St. Theresa Community in Durham was historically a working class African-American neighborhood known as The Bottom. It is located on a large hill overlooking downtown Durham. The neighborhood sits on about one hundred acres, south of North Carolina Highway 147 and northwest of North Carolina Central University.

The name comes from St. Teresa of Ávila Catholic Church, a former congregation for African-Americans at 719 Fargo Street where Fr. Joseph Lawson Howze served as pastor.

In the 1970s, Hassle House, a social program and crisis intervention center for underprivileged communities operated in a building donated by Watts Street Baptist Church, offered tutoring programs for potential high school dropouts from the St. Theresa neighborhood.

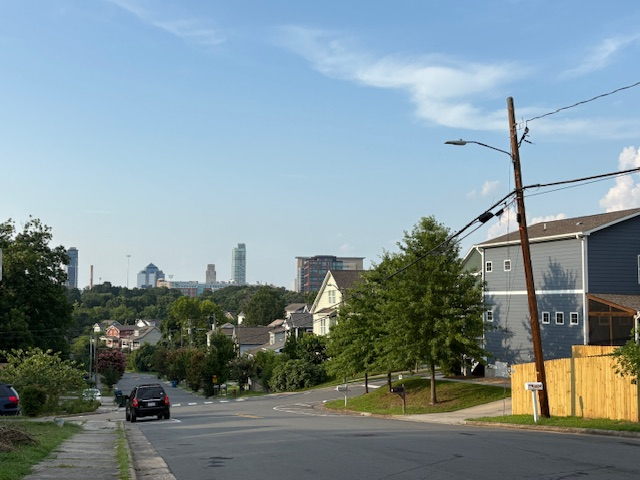
View of Downtown Durham from Southside–Saint Teresa

By the late 1980s, residents were calling the neighborhood "Southside".

In 2006, the Durham City Council approved a plan to demolish the Apex Street Bridge and build pedestrian ramps from the streets to the American Tobacco Trail. The bridge was demolished in 2009, and some residents argued that racism and economic segregation influenced the decision, as the bridge went between the affluent, white neighborhood of Forest Hills and the impoverished, predominately Black neighborhood of Southside St. Theresa.

After failed to redevelop the neighborhood in the 1980s and 1990s, the city's community development director, Reginald Jounson, hired the developer McCormack Baron Salazar to use low-income housing tax credits to fund development projects. The city had previously bought out around forty individual owners in the area to try and gentrify the neighborhood. Salazar's project included the Lofts at Southside, an 132-unit mixed income apartment building, with thirty-nine united available at market rates and twenty units reserved for affordable housing for families earning thirty percent or less of the area's median income. New craftsman style homes were also built, known as the Bungalows at Southside, and older homes were renovated.

By the 2020s, Southside–Saint Teresa had an increasing number of Latino residents.
