= Hayti, Durham, North Carolina =

Historic African-American neighborhood in Durham, North Carolina

Hayti
- Durham neighborhood
- Fayetteville St., Hayti, circa 1940. Courtesy of Durham County Library, NC Collection
- Interactive map of Hayti
- Coordinates: 35.981°N 78.896°W
- Country: United States
- State: North Carolina
- City: Durham
- Named for: Haiti
- Time zone: EST

Hayti (pronounced "HAY-tie"), also called Hayti District, is the historic African-American community that is now part of the city of Durham, North Carolina. It was founded as an independent black community shortly after the American Civil War on the southern edge of Durham by freedmen coming to work in tobacco warehouses and related jobs in the city. By the early decades of the 20th century, African Americans owned and operated more than 200 businesses, which were located along Fayetteville, Pettigrew, and Pine Streets, the boundaries of Hayti.

The neighborhood continued to develop during the late 19th and early 20th centuries, through years of racial segregation imposed by white politicians in the state legislature, following the Reconstruction era in the South. With black-owned businesses and services, a library, a hotel, a theatre, and a hospital, the community became self-sufficient. It declined in the late 20th century, due to suburbanization, which drew some residents to newer housing outside the area. A 1958 urban renewal and freeway project took down houses and businesses in 200 acres of the community and split it with a freeway. St. Joseph's African Methodist Episcopal Church (1891) is listed on the National Register of Historic Places; its congregation was founded in 1868. The church has been used since 1975 as a community and cultural center. Hayti's residents have included African Americans who achieved national reputations for their successes.

== History ==
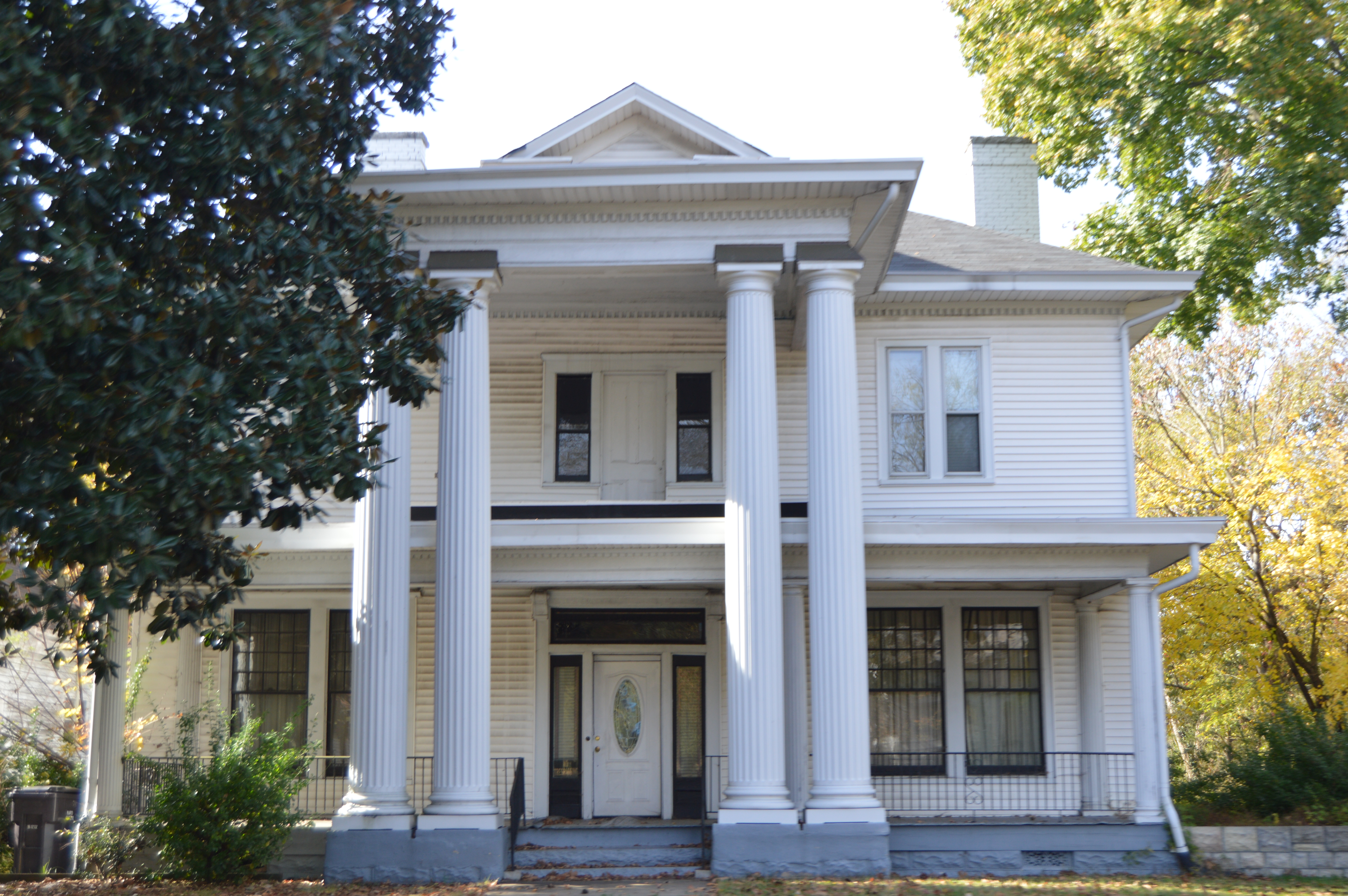
The Scarborough House at 1406 Fayetteville Street

During the 1880s, the neighborhood increased in population and mostly black-run businesses were established. Hayti District, named after Haiti, the first independent black republic in the Western Hemisphere, eventually included a variety of businesses, schools, a library, a theatre, a hotel, the Lincoln Hospital (built in 1900), and other services, making it quite self-sufficient. All classes lived within Hayti, and the black-owned businesses employed numerous residents. The community of African-American majority population flourished from the 1880s through the 1940s. Urban renewal pushed out African-American residents, when a 1950s project took down buildings on more than 200 acres in the heart of Hayti's business district. Efforts to remove substandard housing did not account for damage to the social fabric of communities by such projects; many residents and businesses were permanently displaced. Planned to ease commuting for suburban (mostly white) residents and streamline traffic through older parts of the city, the project was intended to realign streets in coordination with construction of North Carolina Highway 147, a freeway that divided the Hayti district. As most blacks had been excluded from the political system by the state's disfranchising constitution at the end of the 19th century, they were unable to influence the decisions on the location of the freeway.

James E. Shepard was one of the founding fathers of Hayti, along with Aaron McDuffie Moore, John Merrick, and Charles Clinton Spaulding. Shepard, Moore, and Merrick founded the North Carolina Mutual Life Insurance Company (1898), which became the largest and richest African-American company in the United States at the time. It had a land development company as a subsidiary, which helped build much of Hayti. Prosperous African-American funeral home owner J. C. Scarborourgh and his wife Daisy built the Scarborough House at 1406 Fayetteville St.

Among the churches built was St. Joseph's African Methodist Episcopal Church (1891), one of numerous AME churches established in the South following the Civil War. The AME Church was the first independent black denomination in the United States, founded in Philadelphia, Pennsylvania, by free blacks in the early 19th century. St. Joseph's is listed on the National Register of Historic Places, and it has been used since 1975 as a community and cultural center.

Russell Memorial CME Church in Hayti

The first AME services were held in Hayti District in 1868 by Edian Markham, a former slave and AME missionary, in a "brush arbor". As the congregation grew, it built a log structure called Union Bethel AME Church. Another wood church replaced that. By 1891, the community raised money for an architect-designed grand brick church, which they named St. Joseph. Another major black church was White Rock Baptist Church, built in 1896 by a congregation organized earlier in the 19th century. After the war, blacks founded Baptist congregations independent of white supervision, and soon organized their own state and national associations.

In the early 1920s and 1930s, the business section on Pettigrew north of the White Rock Baptist Church was also known as "Lil" Mexico. By then, more than 200 African-American businesses were located along Fayetteville, Pettigrew, and Pine Streets, the major boundaries of Hayti during its heyday.

In 1953, Russell Memorial C.M.E. Church was built along Alston Avenue.

In 2010, the R. Kelly Bryant Jr. Pedestrian Bridge opened over North Carolina Highway 147 to connect Hati with East Durham It was named after R. Kelly Bryant Jr., a Hayti resident and historian.

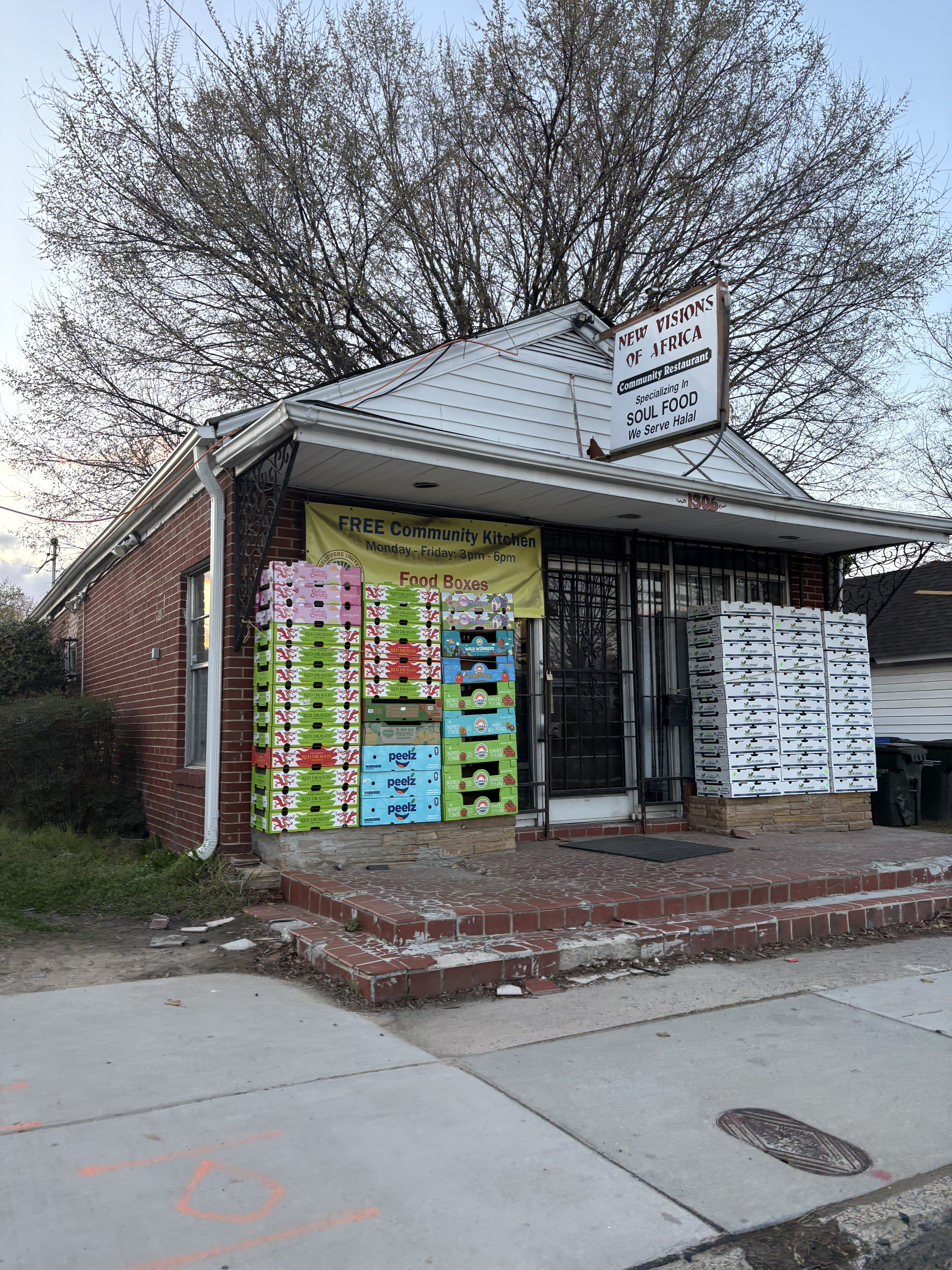
New Visions of Africa Community Restaurant

This small black community was responsible for some national "firsts":

- It was the first all African-American community to be fully self-sufficient. By the early 20th century, it had its own schools, library, churches, barbershops, Lincoln Hospital (1900), movie theater, recreation center, and hotels.
- North Carolina Central University, a historically black college, was established in 1910 by James E. Shepard as a private religious school; by 1925, it became the first African-American liberal arts college in the United States to be state-funded when the state legislature made it part of the state system.
- The Royal Ice Cream Sit-in, one of the first such protests, happened on June 23, 1957. Reverend Douglas Elaine Moore, minister of Asbury Methodist in Hayti, led a group of six other black people (three women, three men) into the Royal Ice Cream Parlor, which had segregated seating according to state law, and sat down in the "white" section. When they were arrested, Moore turned to William A. “Billy” Marsh Jr., a young Durham lawyer, for their defense. The case was eventually appealed to the U.S. Supreme Court. Durham’s black Ministerial Alliance initially opposed Moore’s "radical" actions, as did the citywide political organization, the Durham Committee on Negro Affairs. Participants in the sit-in included Mary Elizabeth Clyburn, Rev. Douglas Elaine Moore, Claude Edward Glenn, Jesse Willard Gray, Vivian Elaine Jones, Melvin Haywood Willis, and Virginia Lee Williams. Such nonviolent demonstrations became a basic tool in the increasing popular activism of the civil-rights movement.

Two national early 20th-century African-American leaders, W. E. B. Du Bois and Booker T. Washington, visited Hayti in 1910 and 1911, respectively. They said the community was a model for all African-American communities in the United States to follow.

== Notable people ==
- Ernie Barnes, NFL star and nationally renowned artist
- Reverend Shirley Caesar, minister, gospel musician
- Blind Boy Fuller (born Fulton Allen) blues guitarist and singer
- Biff Henderson, staff member of Late Show with David Letterman
- John P. Kee, gospel musician
- Lamont Lilly, Movement for Black Lives activist, journalist, and 2016 vice presidential candidate
- John Lucas II, NBA player and professional coach
- Pigmeat Markham, known in the 1950s–1960s as the National Funnyman; his family was the most prominent on its street, which came to be called (and later officially named) Markham Street in the Hayti District
- Tracy McGrady, NBA player, finished high school in the Hayti District
- Clyde McPhatter, 1950–1960s musician, member of the Drifters, member of the Rock and Roll Hall of Fame
- Lyda Moore Merrick, activist and magazine editor
- Rodney Rogers, NBA player
- André Leon Talley, fashion consultant
- Grady Tate, jazz drummer
- Tommy Wilson, NFL player for Los Angeles Rams, Cleveland Browns and Minnesota Vikings

== In popular culture ==
The 2008 Lewis Shiner novel, Black & White, explores the history and legacy of the Hayti community.

== See also ==
- Southside–Saint Teresa, a different African American neighborhood in Durham
