= White Rock Baptist Church =

Historic African American Baptist church in Durham, North Carolina

Coordinates: 35°57′27″N 78°54′39″W

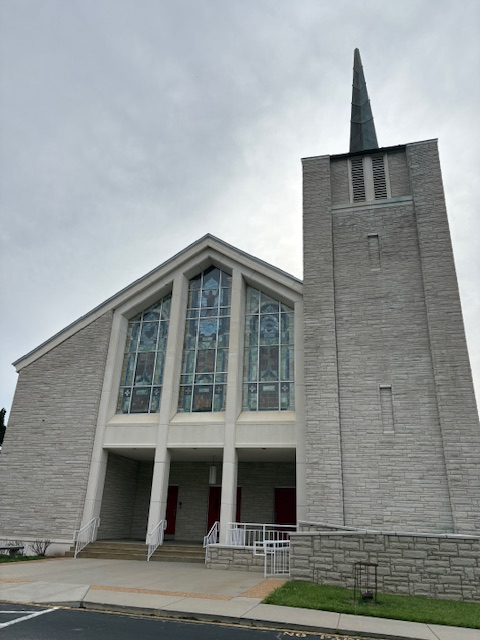
- White Rock in 2025

Religion
- Affiliation: Baptist
- Status: Active

Location
- Location: 3400 Fayetteville Street; Durham, North Carolina, United States
- Interactive map of White Rock Baptist Church

Architecture
- Completed: 1977

Website
- whiterockbaptistchurch.org

White Rock Baptist Church is a historic African-American church in Durham, North Carolina. The congregation was established in 1866 in the Hayti District. In 1960, Martin Luther King, Jr. delivered a speech titled "A Creative Protest" before a crowd of around 1,200 people at the church. The original building was demolished to make way for the Durham Freeway and a new building was constructed further south, on Fayetteville Street, in 1977.

== History ==
White Rock Baptist Church was founded in 1866. The congregation first met in the home of Margaret Ruffin Faucette in Durham's Hayti neighborhood. The Reverends Zuck Horton and Samuel Daddy Hunt were the first ministers to lead the congregation.

Dr. Augustus Shepard, father of Dr. James E. Shepard, founder of North Carolina Central University led the congregation between 1901 and 1911.

A number of prominent African American citizens were members of White Rock Baptist Church, including Asa and Edna Spaulding, parents of Asa T. Spaulding Jr., and Dr. Aaron Moore. Dr. Moore donated funds for a Sunday School building and started a library in the church's basement, which would later become the Durham Colored Library and then the Stanford L. Warren Public Library.

In 1960, just after the start of the sit-in movement at the Woolworth store in Greensboro, North Carolina, Dr. Martin Luther King Jr. gave a speech titled "A Creative Protest" at White Rock Baptist Church to a crowd estimated at 1,200. King made five appearances in Durham.

The original church building was demolished to make way for the Durham Freeway, and a new building was constructed further south on Fayetteville Street with the congregation moving in in 1977.
