= Forest Hills Historic District (Durham, North Carolina) =

Historic district in North Carolina, United States

- U.S. National Register of Historic Places
- U.S. Historic district
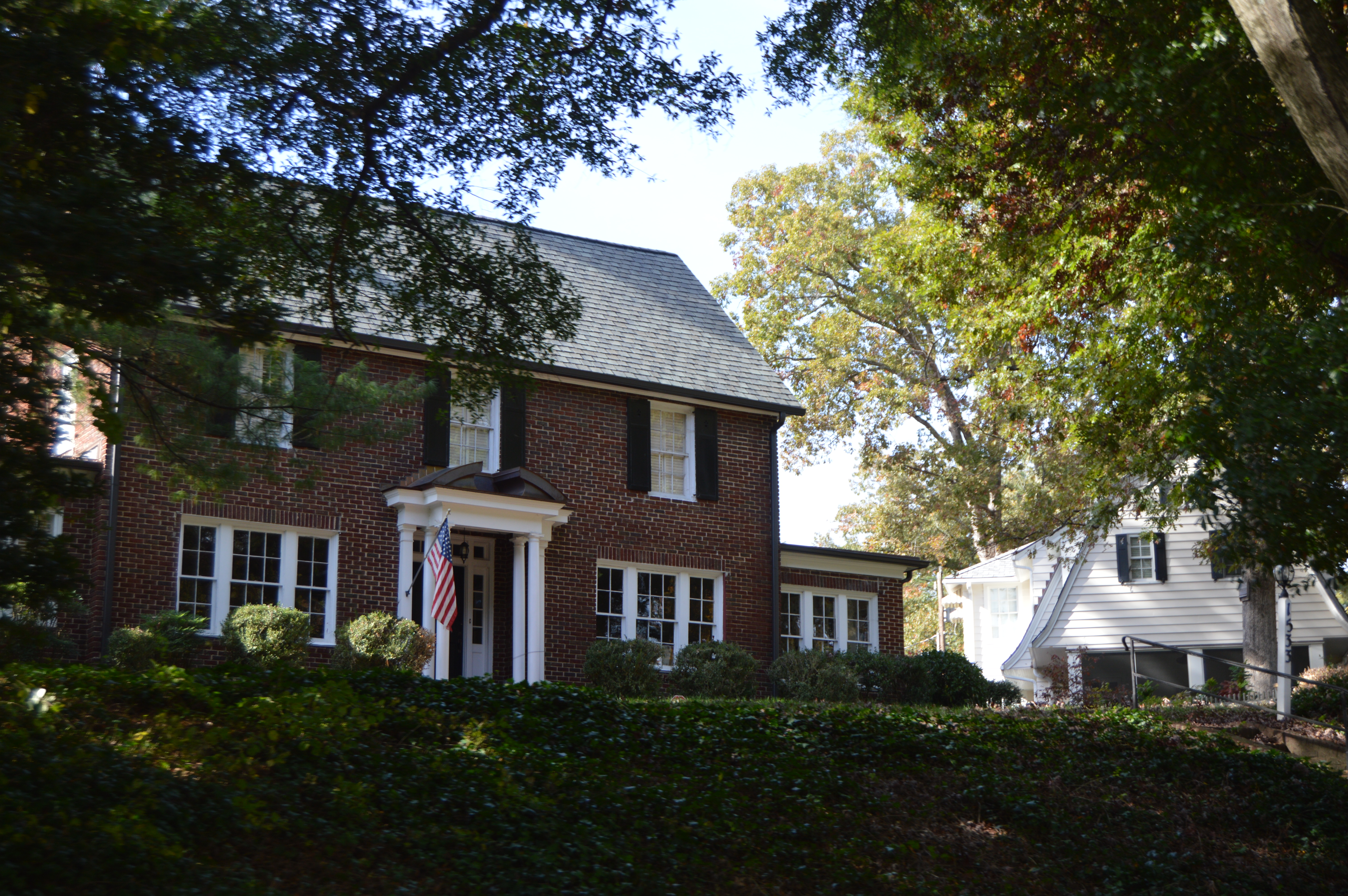
- Houses on Hermitage Court

- Location within North Carolina Location within the United States
- Location: Roughly bounded by Kent St., Bivins St., Wells St., American Tobacco Trail, Forestwood Dr. and Beverly Dr., Durham, North Carolina
- Coordinates: 35°58′55″N 78°54′53″W
- Area: 245 acres (99 ha)
- Built: 1923
- Architect: George Watts Carr, et al.
- Architectural style: Bungalow/craftsman, Colonial Revival
- MPS: Durham MRA
- NRHP reference No.: 05001476
- Added to NRHP: December 28, 2005

Forest Hills Historic District is a national historic district located at Durham, Durham County, North Carolina. The district encompasses 312 contributing buildings, 3 contributing sites, and 4 contributing structures in a predominantly residential section of Durham that was the city's first automobile suburb. The buildings primarily date between about 1923 and 1955 and include notable examples of Colonial Revival and Bungalow / American Craftsman architecture. Notable contributing resources include Forest Hills Park, the subdivision plan, the original campus of Durham Academy, and the separately listed Mary Duke Biddle Estate.

It was listed on the National Register of Historic Places in 2005.

On December 9, 2001, Nortel executive Kathleen Peterson was reportedly murdered by her husband, the writer Michael Peterson, in their mansion in Forest Hills.

== Notable buildings ==
- Mary Duke Biddle Estate

== Notable residents ==
- Kathleen Peterson, business executive and murder victim
- Michael Peterson, writer and convicted criminal
- Mary Duke Biddle Trent Semans, heiress and philanthropist
- Mena Webb, journalist and writer

== See also ==
- Southside–Saint Teresa
