= Bill Bishop (businessman) =

American real estate developer and murder victim

William Bishop (September 29, 1958 – April 21, 2018) was an American businessman, real estate developer, and urban designer. In 2018, Bishop was found unresponsive at his Hope Valley Country Club home in Durham, North Carolina. His death is currently under criminal investigation.

== Biography ==
Bishop grew up in Pittsburgh. He worked as a metalwork artist before starting a business career as an urban designer. He became a prominent real estate developer in Hillsborough County, Florida and was responsible for the building of Pebble Creek, Westchase, Waterchase and Highland Park communities. He also had a prominent role in the development of Fish Hawk.

In 2008, after being diagnosed with prostate cancer, he moved to North Carolina while receiving treatment at Duke University Health System. At the same time, he began work on a master's degree in city and regional planning from the University of North Carolina at Chapel Hill, eventually working toward his Ph.D.

In 2012, Bishop sustained a serious injury to the right side of his body that rendered his right arm "largely functionless". While this injury rendered Bishop unable to hold items or shake hands with his right arm and hand, the injury that resulted in his death was purported to have been caused by a dog leash held by or slipped over his right hand.

Bishop had been married to Sharon Bishop, with whom he had two sons, Jefferson and Alexander. He and his wife separated in November 2016. Bishop filed for divorce on November 13, 2017. The divorce was granted on April 6, 2018. After his separation, he began a relationship with clinical psychologist Julie Seel. At the time of his death, Bishop and his two sons, who he had sole custody of, resided in Hope Valley Country Club in Durham, North Carolina.

== Legal issues ==
In 2010, his wife filed court documents outlining Bishops' reportedly abusive behavior, including verbal abuse, death threats, threatening suicide, carrying a loaded gun around their home, and breaking possessions. The court documents filed by Sharon Bishop claimed that he was no longer taking his medications for severe depression. A judge ordered that the couple's assets be frozen and granted Sharon Bishop a domestic violence order of protection against Bishop on March 30, 2010 after Bishop had blocked his wife from having access to a marital bank account holding $150,000 and an investment account with over $2.8 million. On April 9, 2010, the order was voluntarily dismissed by Bishop's wife. In March 2017, Bishop was awarded full custody of his two sons after his estranged wife had moved to Florida to receive treatment for alcoholism.

== Death and investigation ==
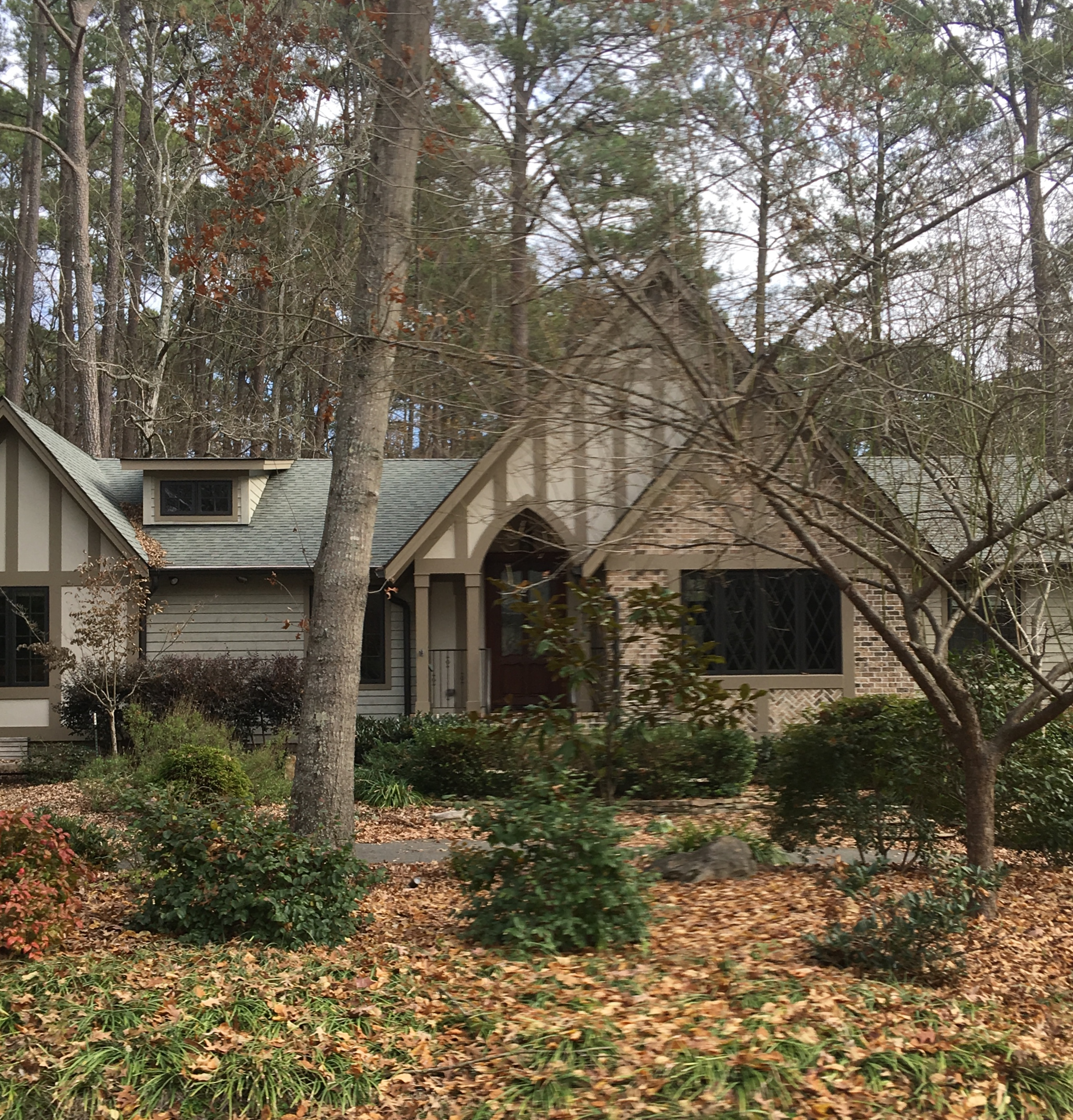
Bishop's Hope Valley home, where he was murdered.

On April 18, 2018, Bishop's 16-year-old son, Alexander, called police to report finding his father unconscious and strangled by a dog leash in the movie theater of their Hope Valley home. He was taken to Duke University Hospital, where he died three days later. A North Carolina medical examiner ruled Bishop's death a homicide and said the death was caused by strangulation. A homicide investigation began six days after Bishop was found. According to search warrants, Alexander Bishop, then a student at Durham Academy, called his mother five times before making the 9-1-1 call. Alexander Bishop told first responders that he found his father unconscious in their home, with the dog attached to a leash tangled around his neck. The son also claimed that his father had been emotionally abusive his entire life.

Alexander Bishop was indicted by a grand jury on February 18, 2019 on a charge of first-degree murder and was arrested four days later. He was released on an $250,000 unsecured bond on February 25, 2019. In February 2020, the case against Alexander was dismissed due to insufficient evidence. His attorney attributed the death to "a tragic cardiac event during or after which the dog got his leash wrapped around William Bishop’s neck.” The case remains officially unsolved as of August 2024.
