= North Durham-Duke Park District =

Historic district in North Carolina, United States

- U.S. National Register of Historic Places
- U.S. Historic district
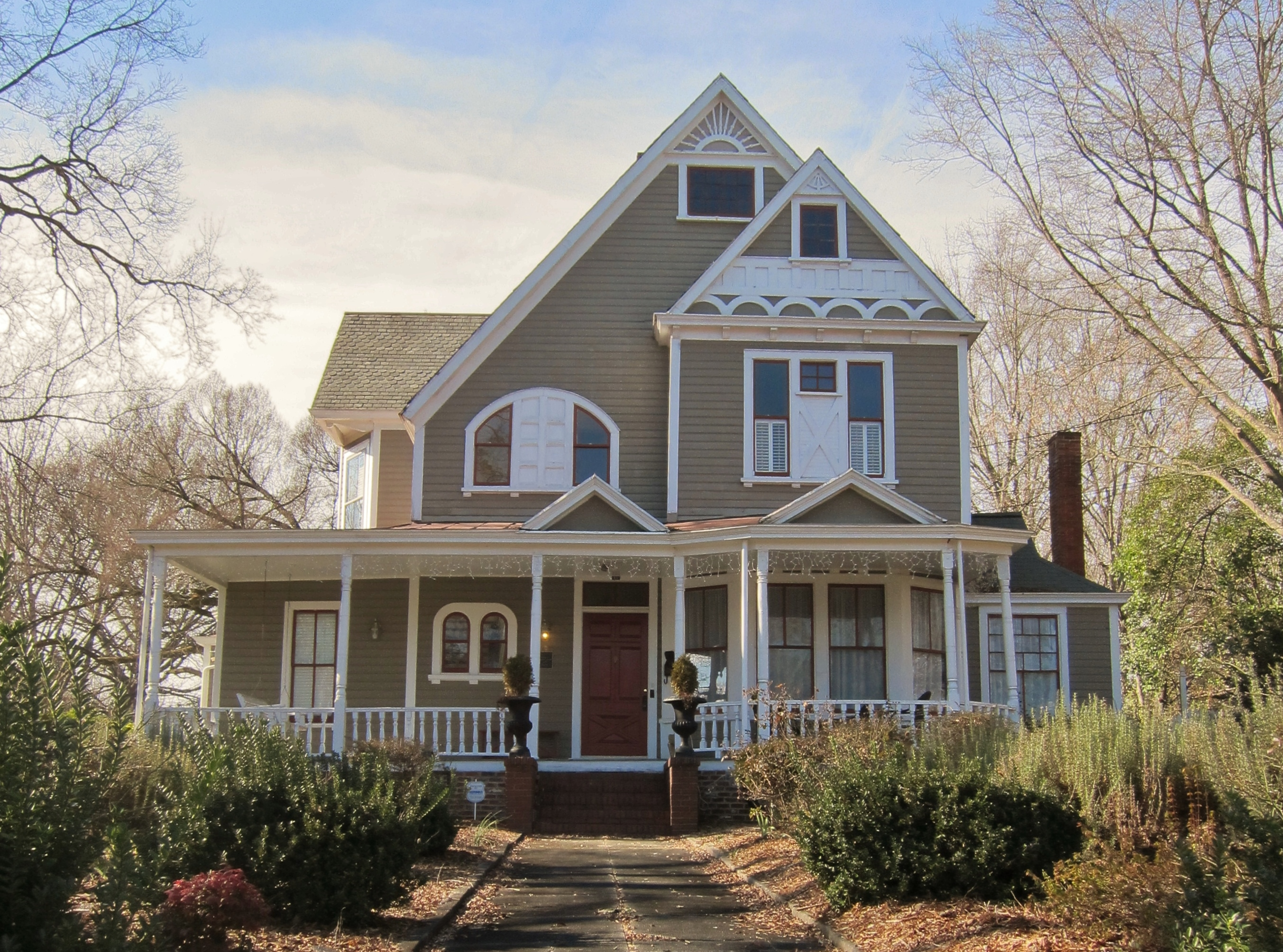

- Location within North Carolina Location within the United States
- Location: Roughly bounded by Glendale Ave., W. Knox St., Roxboro Rd., Trinity Ave., Magnum & Broadway Sts., Durham, North Carolina
- Coordinates: 36°00′22″N 78°53′38″W
- Area: 71.2 acres (28.8 ha)
- Architect: Multiple
- Architectural style: Late 19th And 20th Century Revivals, Bungalow/craftsman, Late Victorian
- NRHP reference No.: 85001338
- Added to NRHP: June 20, 1985

North Durham-Duke Park District is a national historic district located at Durham, Durham County, North Carolina. The district encompasses 229 contributing buildings in a predominantly residential section of Durham. The dwelling are mostly one to two-story frame buildings, dating mostly from the 1890s to 1930s and include notable examples of Bungalow / American Craftsman, Late Victorian, and Queen Anne architecture. Notable buildings include the Markham Apartments (c. 1910), Perry Building (1927), and Calvary United Methodist Church.

It was listed on the National Register of Historic Places in 1985.

== Notable buildings ==
- Whitehall Terrace
