= Holloway Street District =

Historic district in North Carolina, United States

- U.S. National Register of Historic Places
- U.S. Historic district
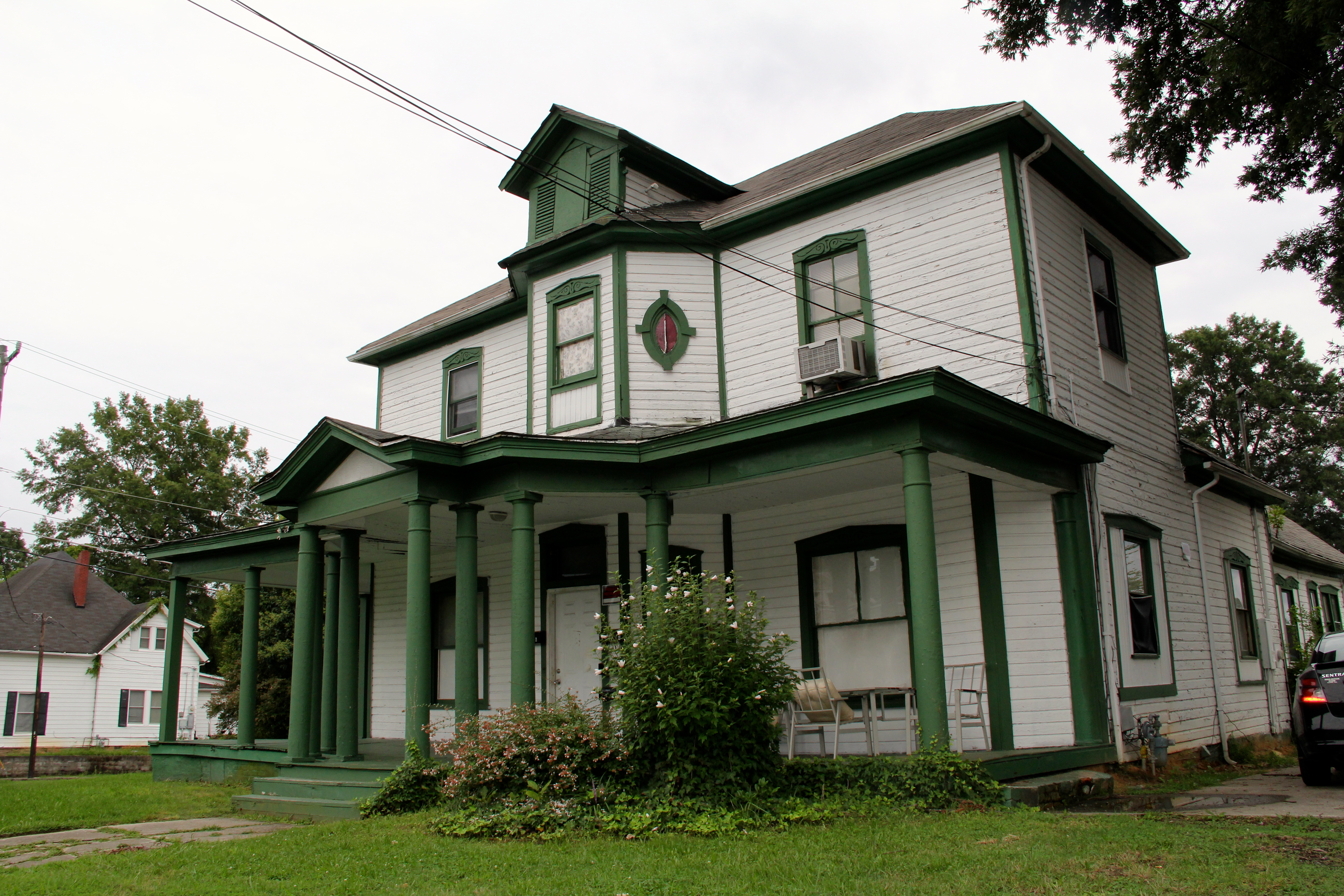
- Holloway Street Historic District, August 2014

- Location within North Carolina Location within the United States
- Location: Roughly bounded by Holloway, Railroad & Liberty Sts., Peachtree Pl. & Dillard St.; also roughly bounded by Holloway, Elizabeth, Primitive, and Queen Sts., and Mallard Ave., Durham, North Carolina
- Coordinates: 35°59′43″N 78°53′30″W
- Area: 40.7 acres (16.5 ha)
- Architect: Multiple
- Architectural style: Colonial Revival, Classical Revival, Queen Anne, Bungalow/craftsman
- MPS: Durham MRA
- NRHP reference No.: 85002437, 09000263 (Boundary Increase)
- Added to NRHP: September 20, 1985, April 30, 2009 (Boundary Increase)

Holloway Street District is a national historic district located at Durham, Durham County, North Carolina, United States. The district encompasses 116 contributing buildings and 2 contributing structures in a predominantly residential section of Durham. They were built between the 1880s and 1945 and include notable examples of Classical Revival, Queen Anne, Colonial Revival and Bungalow / American Craftsman style architecture.

It was listed on the National Register of Historic Places in 1985, with a boundary increase in 2009.
