= William Bell (architect) =

Scottish architect and builder

William Bell (1789 – 1865) was a Scottish architect and builder, who emigrated to the United States and practiced in North Carolina.

The Confederate arsenal in Fayetteville, North Carolina, by William Bell (destroyed March 1865)

== Life ==
William Bell was born in Aberdour on the coast of Fife on 28 October 1789.

Bell trained in Medicine at Edinburgh University prior to turning to architecture. In 1826 he married Margaret Robertson, and they had several children. In 1832/3, the family was living at 7 India Place, in the Stockbridge area of Edinburgh. The building was demolished in the 1970s. Bell's known works in Scotland are limited to churches in the north (harbour area) of Edinburgh.

Bell emigrated with his family to the United States in 1833. He quickly became involved in design and construction of arsenal buildings for the US Army, designing facilities in Yonkers, New York in 1833 and Washington, DC in 1834. In 1835, he happened to meet fellow Scot, David Paton, at a quarry in New York. Paton was then working on the North Carolina State Capitol in Raleigh, and the two men decided to work together.

In 1837 Paton recommended Bell for a federal commission to build a massive United States Arsenal in Fayetteville, North Carolina. Bell worked on this complex project for nearly three decades, as it comprised around 25 buildings. He employed up to 200 laborers (including enslaved African Americans) at any given time during its construction. Bell and his family lived at the arsenal during this period.

When the Confederate States of America took over the arsenal in 1861, Bell continued as architect and facility manager. The arsenal was destroyed in 1865 by General Sherman’s troops during the American Civil War.

Bell died on 17 September 1865. It is said that he died of a broken heart on seeing his life’s work destroyed.

== Principal works ==
- St Thomas Church, Great Junction Street, Leith, Scotland (1824) (now used as a Sikh temple)
- St Andrews Church, St Andrew Place, Leith, Scotland (1826) (now a Hindu temple)
- Federal arsenal, near Yonkers, New York (1833)
- Federal arsenal, Washington D.C. (1834)
- Arsenal, Charleston, South Carolina (possibly 1834), designed with William Strickland
- Federal arsenal, Fayetteville, North Carolina (1837-1865)
- Drawings for buildings for the University of North Carolina at Chapel Hill (1839) (unbuilt)
