= Stokesdale Historic District =

Historic district in North Carolina, United States

- U.S. National Register of Historic Places
- U.S. Historic district
- Location within North Carolina Location within the United States
- Location: Roughly bounded by Fayetteville St., Umstead St., Lawson St., Moline St., Concord St., and Dunstan St., Durham, North Carolina
- Coordinates: 35°58′46″N 78°53′56″W
- Area: 67 acres (27 ha)
- Built: c. 1912-1960
- Architectural style: Queen Anne, Bungalow/craftsman, Colonial Revival, Tudor Revival
- MPS: Durham MRA
- NRHP reference No.: 10001093
- Added to NRHP: December 28, 2010

Stokesdale Historic District is a national historic district located at Durham, Durham County, North Carolina. The district encompasses 227 contributing buildings, 1 contributing site, and 1 contributing structure in a historically African-American residential section of Durham. The buildings primarily date between about 1912 and 1960 and include notable examples of Queen Anne, Colonial Revival, Tudor Revival, and Bungalow / American Craftsman architecture. Notable buildings include Page's Grocery (c. 1913), College Inn (c. 1935), Covenant United Presbyterian Church (1948), and Seventh Day Adventist Church (1954).

It was listed on the National Register of Historic Places in 2010.
