= Hope Valley, Durham, North Carolina =

Historic district in North Carolina, United States

- Hope Valley Historic District
- U.S. National Register of Historic Places
- U.S. Historic district
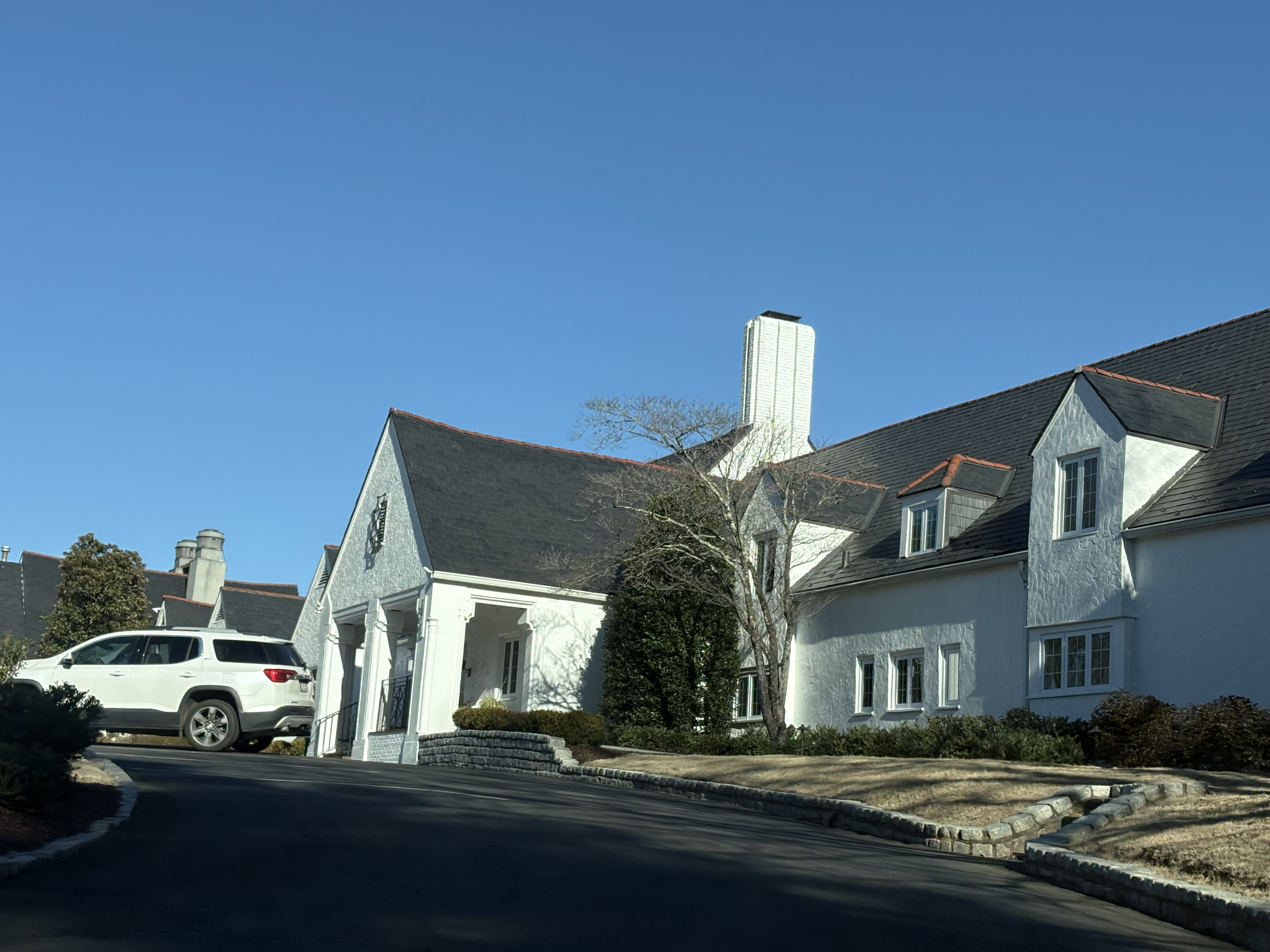
- Hope Valley Country Club in 2026

- Location within North Carolina Location within the United States
- Location: Avon Rd., Chelsea Circle, Cornwall Rd., Devon Rd. Exeter Way, Littlewoods Ln., Norwich Way, Stratford Rd., Durham, North Carolina
- Coordinates: 35°56′56″N 78°56′52″W
- Area: 300 acres (120 ha)
- Architect: Boyer, M.E., Jr.; Carr, George Watts; Keen, Charles Barton; Hackney and Knott; Sprinkle; Davis, Archie; et al.
- Architectural style: Colonial Revival, Tudor Revival
- MPS: Durham MRA
- NRHP reference No.: 09001105
- Added to NRHP: December 11, 2009

Hope Valley was the first full-fledged country club community in the suburbs of Durham, Durham County, North Carolina. It is developed around an 18-hole Donald Ross golf course. Created in 1925-26 just before the stock market crash of 1929, Hope Valley remained a unique rural colony until after World War II. Well outside the city limits Hope Valley was situated between Durham and Chapel Hill and their university campuses, Duke University and University of North Carolina at Chapel Hill. It was one of North Carolina's first suburbs designed to be completely serviced by the automobile, well beyond urban transportation routes. It was listed on the National Register of Historic Places in 2009 as the Hope Valley Historic District, a national historic district.

At the center of the district and the apex of the golf course stands the Aymar Embury II Hope Valley Country Club Clubhouse. Although heavily remodeled over the years the front facade remains intact. Hope Valley, the residential development and Country Club will celebrate its centennial in 2026 and 2027.

== Hope Valley Historic District ==
The district encompasses 80 contributing buildings, 1 contributing site, and 2 contributing objects in a predominantly upper-class residential section of Durham. They were built between 1927 and 1959 and include notable examples of Colonial Revival and Tudor Revival style architecture. The centerpiece of the district is the country club and golf course. Located in the district are the separately listed John C. and Binford Carr House and Wiley and Elizabeth Forbus House.

== History ==
Hope Valley's original developers were Jesse Mebane of Greensboro, North Carolina and Walter Sharpe of Burlington, North Carolina (Mebane and Sharpe, Inc.). Early investors included many local residents and Greensboro's Richardson Family (Richardson - Vicks Pharmaceuticals) who later took control of the development and renaming the corporation Hope Valley, Inc.

In a rare collaboration, Donald Ross, Aymar Embury II, and Robert Cridland came together to create Hope Valley. Ross designed the 18 hole golf course, Embury designed the French Eclectic style Country Club Clubhouse, and Cridland designed the roadways and landscape.

The Hope Valley Country Club (HVCC) golf course has undergone a multimillion-dollar renovation and restoration, with a major focus on its greens. The Hope Valley Country Club created by a collaboration of the development's original backers and Durham business leaders has been the careful steward of this Donald Ross "Gem" for over 80 years. The first golf professional was Marshall Crichton (1926–1960) and the course has had a member of the Crichton family on staff ever since. In the Spring of 2013 HVCC completed a renovation of its swimming pools and surrounding wet areas. The club also has an active year-round tennis program with seven clay courts, two hard courts, and four pickleball courts.

The neighborhood is experiencing infill as retiring and moving residents sell their side lots, mid-century ranches and investment properties. There have also been some examples of "tear down" purchases. The homes of some of Durham's first and second generation business, education and social leaders including Russell Barringer, Frank Kenan, Herschel Caldwell, Wilburt Davison, and John Moorhead have been razed for new residential construction.

The Hubert Teer House, a Hope Valley landmark from 1932, is well known for the exact miniature model of it that Mr. Teer built on the grounds as a playhouse for his daughter. It underwent a significant and sympathetic restoration by its current resident Mr. Teer's above-mentioned daughter and her husband prior to 2002.

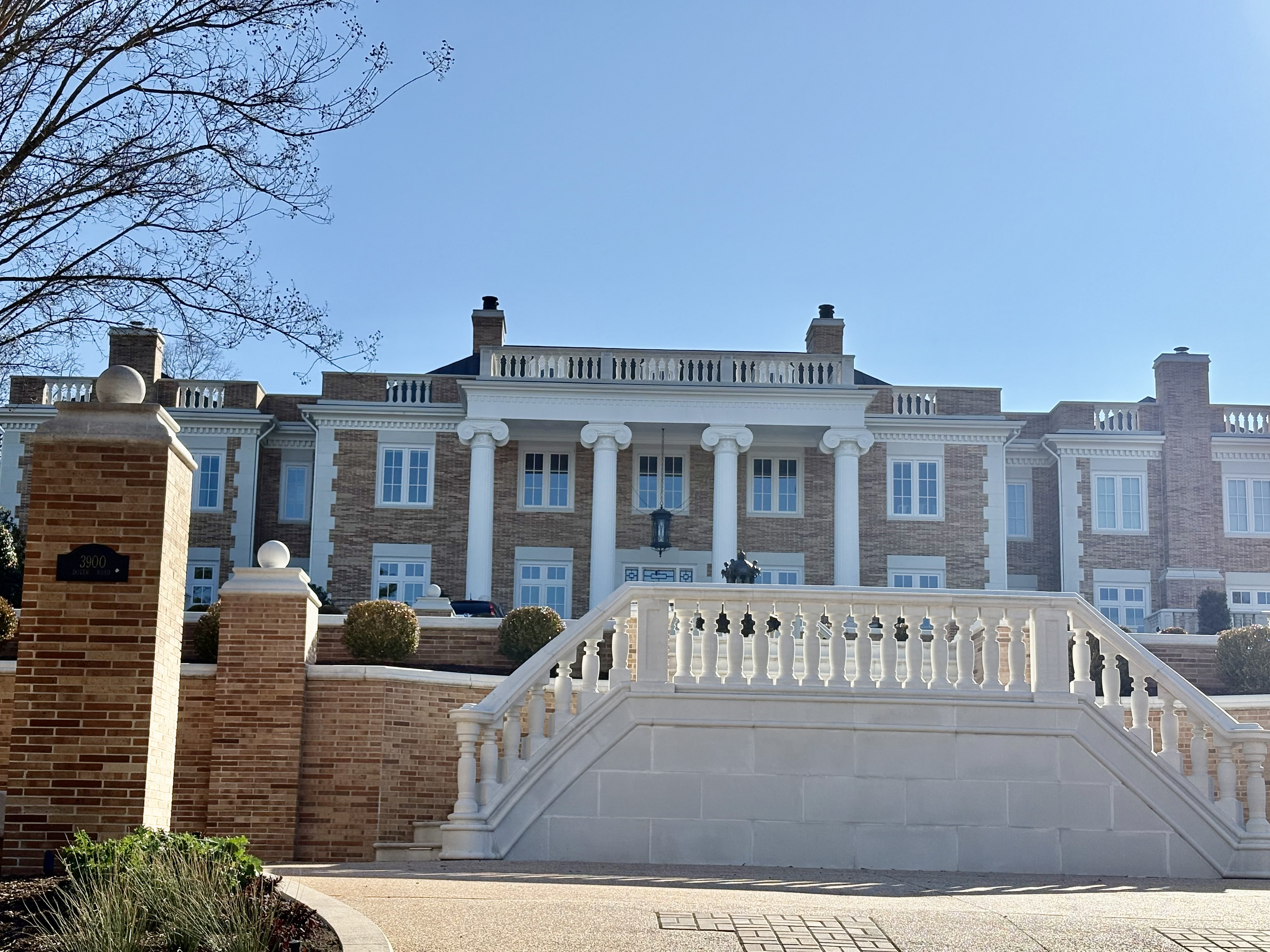
A house on Dover Road in Hope Valley

The Hope Valley neighborhood is often referred to as "Old Hope Valley", with a relative absence of newly constructed homes with the vast majority of houses situated on lots that are considerably larger than those in newer, close by developments (including the adjacent areas of "New Hope Valley", and Marydell, Hope Valley Green, Woodcroft and Hope Valley Farms)--some as much as four acres. Many areas in Hope Valley are heavily wooded and are home to deer, foxes, red-shouldered hawks and barred owls. Hope Valley is convenient to Chapel Hill, Research Triangle Park, Raleigh-Durham International Airport, Cary and Raleigh via I-40 (3 miles South).

== Notable buildings ==
- John C. and Binford Carr House
- Hubert Teer House
- Wiley and Elizabeth Forbus House

== Notable residents and country club members ==
- Vernetta Alston, politician and attorney
- Bill Bishop, real estate developer and murder victim
- Victor Dzau, scientist and former head of Duke Medical Center
- Eddie Cameron, coach and athletic director at Duke University
- Douglas Knight, academic and former head of Duke University
- Thom Mount, film producer
- Mena Webb, journalist and writer
- Frank Kenan, businessman and philanthropist
- Wilbert Davison, first dean of Duke Medical School and architect of Duke Health
- Nello Teer Jr., businessman
