= Bull Durham (disambiguation) =

Bull Durham may refer to:

- Bull Durham, a 1988 American film
- Bull Durham (pitcher) (1877–1960), American baseball pitcher
- Ed Durham (1907–1976), American baseball pitcher nicknamed "Bull"
- Leon Durham (born 1957), American baseball first baseman nicknamed "Bull"
- Bull Durham Smoking Tobacco

== See also ==
- Bull Durham Sacks & Railroad Tracks
- Bull Durham Tobacco Factory
- Durham Bulls
