= Poplar Hill (Hillsborough, North Carolina) =

House in Hillsborough, North Carolina

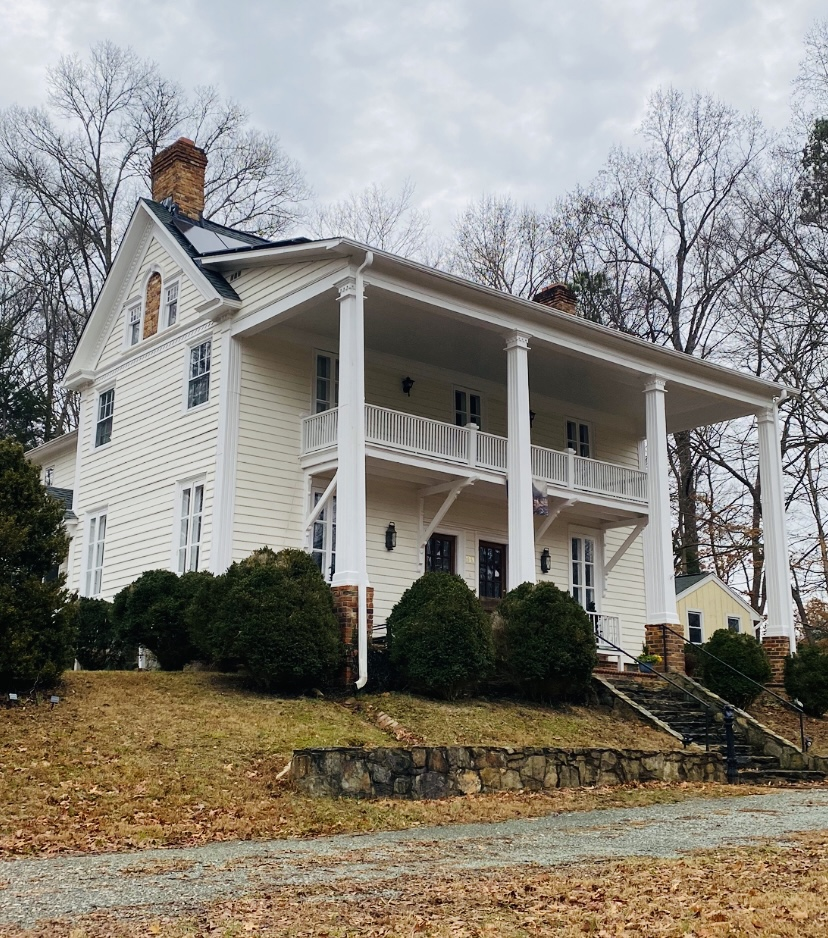
- Poplar Hill in 2023
- Interactive map of Poplar Hill
- Alternative names: Banks of the Eno; Occoneechee Farm

General information
- Type: plantation house
- Architectural style: Greek Revival
- Location: Hillsborough, North Carolina, U.S.
- Coordinates: 36°04′22″N 79°05′41″W
- Owner: Hogg family (previous); Julian Carr (previous); Kilgore family (current)

Poplar Hill is a historic plantation house in Hillsborough, North Carolina. The home was the center of a large plantation, formerly called Occoneechee Farm and Banks of the Eno. Established on farming and hunting grounds for the Occaneechi and Saponi peoples, the land was granted to colonist Francis Corbin by the English and made into a working plantation. Ownership later passed to the Hogg family before the farm was purchased in 1891 by tobacco industrialist and white supremacist Julian Carr. Carr and his wife had the original 1794 plain farmhouse redone in the Greek Revival style. After Carr's death, the house was moved from its original location to a new lot in the Hillsborough Historic District. Poplar Hill later became a rental property and, in the twenty-first century, many tenants, including the singer Tom Maxwell, have broken their leases due to reported hauntings on the property.

== History ==
The land that became the plantation was once farming and hunting grounds for the Occaneechi and Saponi people. In the 18th century an English land grant was given to Francis Corbin that included the grounds. The plantation was farmed by a succession of families and was named Banks of the Eno, due to its close proximity to the Eno River, by the farmer James Hogg in 1794. The Poplar Hill house was completed in 1794.

On April 25, 1891, tobacco industrialist and white supremacist Julian Carr purchased the 663-acre property for $10,000 from James Hogg and his sister, Margaret. Carr and his wife, Nannie Graham Parrish Carr, named the main house Poplar Hill. The Carrs hired Jules Gilmer Körner to redecorate Poplar Hill, which was originally a plain farmhouse.Körner redesigned the house as a stereotypical Greek Revival plantation mansion, with a widow's walk, large front porch colonnade, and a shallow balcony.He also put in French windows in the downstairs and created two formal entrances along the porch.

Poplar Hill was a secondary residence for the Carr family, whose main residence was Somerset Villa, a large mansion in downtown Durham. Julian Carr, who had immense wealth due to the success of the W. T. Blackwell and Company and Durham Cotton Manufacturing Company, sought to recreate the life of a gentleman farmer. Carr developed the farm into a full-scale working farm with a large sheep barn, large piggery, breeding pens, a full dairy barn with fifty-six stanchions, five poultry houses which housed over 1,5000 chickens, and a three-story barn wit thirty-six stalls for horses and a basement for mules.Carr also constructed a half mile horse track on the southern bank of the Eno River, northeast of the farm buildings.

The farm was significantly damaged by a tornado in 1919, although the house was relatively untouched by the storm. The farming business never fully recovered and, due to his declining health, Carr sold the property in the early 1920s. Poplar Hill was advertised for sale on October 26, 1923, in the Durham Morning Herald, listed by Carver Real Estate. It was advertised again on November 22, 1923, by the Atlantic Coast Realty Company based out of Winston-Salem. Shortly before Carr's death on April 29, 1924, the property was divided into several smaller farms and sold in pieces.

In the 1940s, NASCAR founder William France, purchased the horsetrack built by Carr and launched the Occoneechee Speedway. In the 1950s, small farms that had once been part of the plantation were sold and developed into suburban neighborhoods.

In 1980, Poplar Hill was moved from its original location to the other side of the Eno River, on the southern end of Cameron Street in the Hillsborough Historic District, by James Freeland. Freeland had planned to turn the house into a restaurant, but decided against it after facing opposition from Hillsborough residents. Poplar Hill's new location was a few yards from the site where six Regulators were hanged in 1771 after being condemned by Richard Henderson. Poplar Hill then became a rental property.

The house is reportedly haunted. Musician and writer Tom Maxwell rented the house, but broke the lease due to hauntings.
