= Somerset Villa =

Mansion in North Carolina, US, 1888–1924

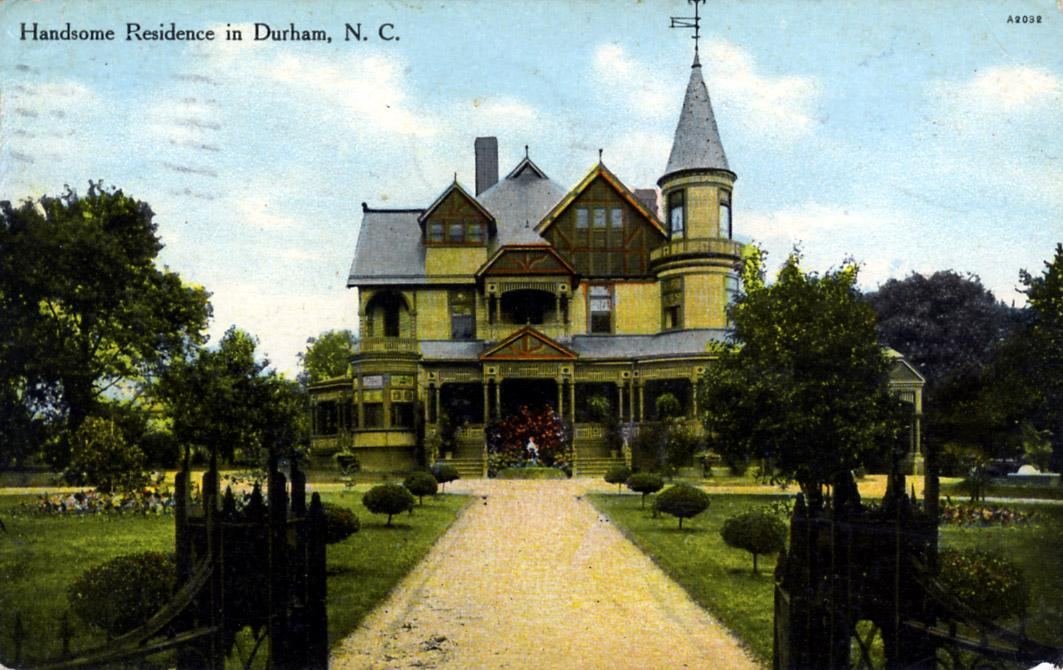
- Somerset Villa in 1910
- Interactive map of the Somerset Villa area
- Alternative names: Julian S. Carr House; Waverly Honor

General information
- Status: Demolished
- Type: Villa, Private residence
- Architectural style: New World Queen Anne Revival
- Location: 111 South Dillard Street; Durham, North Carolina, U.S.
- Coordinates: 35.9930°N 78.8954°W
- Completed: 1888
- Demolished: 1924
- Owner: Julian S. Carr

Design and construction
- Architect: John B. Halcott

Somerset Villa, also known as the Julian S. Carr House, was a Queen Anne Revival mansion in the Downtown East Neighborhood of Durham, North Carolina. The villa was built in 1888 by the architect John B. Halcott for the North Carolinian industrialist Julian S. Carr. The house, considered one of the grandest Gilded Age mansions in Durham, was demolished following Carr's death.

== History ==
In 1870, the wealthy industrialist Julian S. Carr built an estate on the southeast corner of East Main Street and South Dillard Street in the Downtown East Neighborhood of Durham, North Carolina. The large Italianate house was named Waverly Honor, and was later dismantled and moved to the south side of Peabody Street (now Ramseur Street). In 1888, Carr hired the architect John B. Halcott and the contractor William Carter Bain to construct an ornate villa on the grounds where Waverly Honor stood. It cost $100,000 to build. He named the villa Somerset after his ancestor, Robert Carr, 1st Earl of Somerset.

Somerset Villa was one of the grandest Gilded Age mansions built in Durham. A Richmond newspaper reported that the home was "the conspicuous landmark [of Durham] upon which the eye first falls and upon which it loves to linger." It included a large turret on the northeast side of the house that was capped by an ornate copper weathervane and a two hundred and twenty-foot veranda. The interior of the home featured stained glass windows, painted ceilings, carved mantels, a stairway platform inlaid with medallions of white holly, mahogany rosewood, and ebony, and floors made with French mosaic tile. The estate, which included elaborate gardens, service buildings, and greenhouses, took up an entire city block.

Somerset Villa was Carr's city dwelling, as he also owned a country estate in Hillsborough known as Poplar Hill.

In 1915, Carr's wife, Nannie Graham Parrish Carr, died. Carr remained in the house until his death in 1924. The home was demolished between 1924 and 1926. Peabody Street was extended through the middle of the former lot. The homes located at 1008 Green Street, 1010 Green Street, and 1012 Green Street were all constructed using salvage from Somerset Villa. The gates of Somerset Villa were moved to 147 Pinecrest Road in Duke Forest.
