= Mull & Fromer, Masons and Builders =

Mull & Fromer
- Industry: Construction
- Founded: Circa 1877
- Defunct: Circa 1892
- Fate: Senior partner retired
- Headquarters: Catskill, New York, United States; New York, New York, United States,
- Key people: DeWitt Mull, Gottlieb Fromer and Adrian Mull, partners
- Services: Masonry and General Contracting

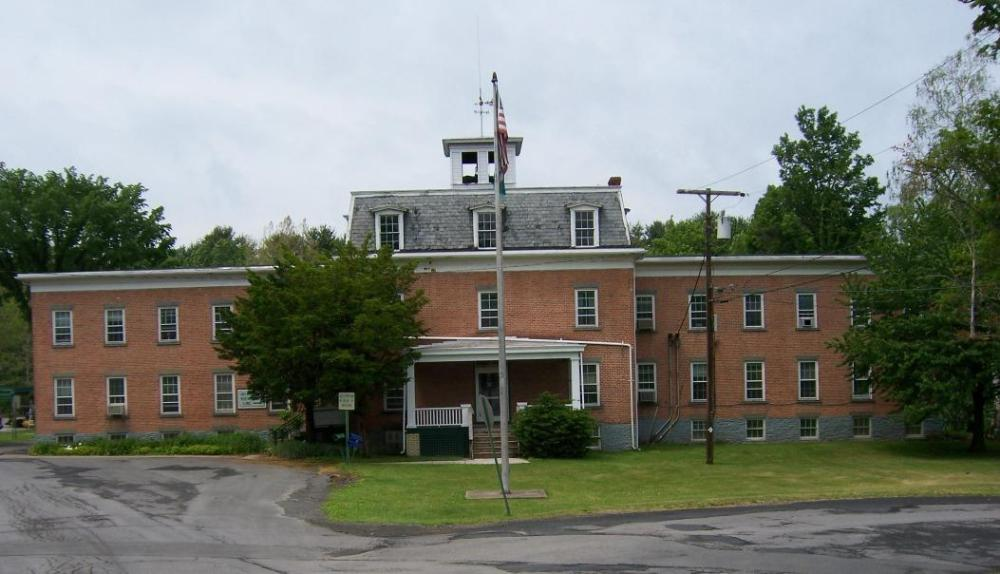
Greene County Office Building, Cairo, New York, formerly the Greene County Alms House. Built 1883. John B. Halcott (1846-1895), architect. Mull & Fromer, contractors.

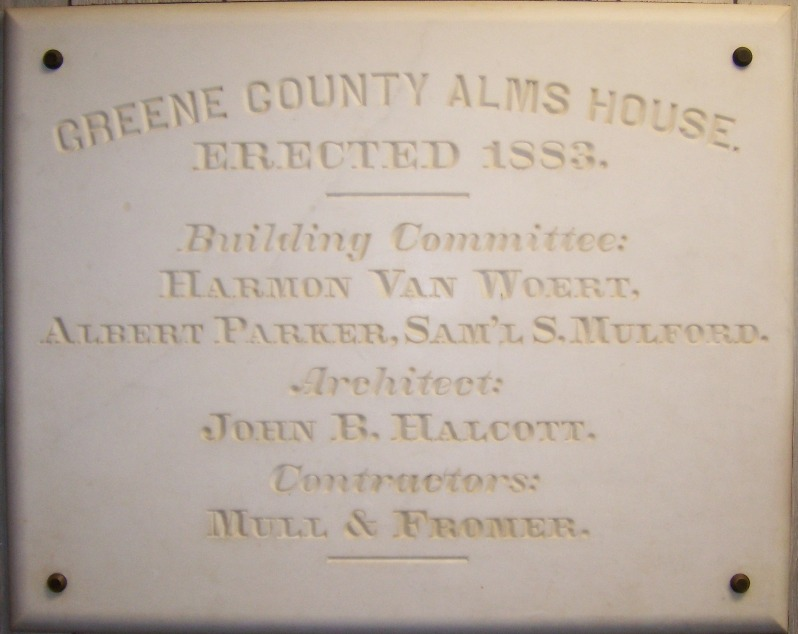
Building Plaque from the Greene County Office Building, Cairo, New York, formerly the Greene County Alms House.

Mull & Fromer was a United States construction company based in Catskill, New York.

DeWitt Mull was a lead mason for L.S. & William Smith when the company "laid 150 rods of stone and 60,000 bricks" as foundation walls for an expansion of the original Grant House Hotel in a record nine days. Gottlieb Fromer and DeWitt Mull's son, Adrian (b. 1860), were also employed by L.S. & William Smith. They frequently worked with Edwin Lampman, a carpenter formerly employed by L.S. & William Smith.

After completing several private projects in 1877, Mull & Fromer "built the West Catskill school house with their accustomed thoroughness" during the following year.

Mull & Fromer were also the masons for the construction of two structures listed in the National Register of Historic Places: The Stuyvesant Railroad Station, built in 1880; and the Hop-O-Nose Knitting Mill, built in 1881.

The most well known structure built by Mull & Fromer is probably the Greene County Office Building in Cairo, New York, formerly the Greene County Alms House, built 1883, John B. Halcott (1846–1895), architect. The prior alms house was "illy-constructed" according to an 1857 investigation and in "May of 1882, a committee was formed to provide estimates for building a new structure." The building currently serves as the location of the Greene County Department of Mental Health.

Mull & Fromer built at least six buildings in New York City, New York: One on the west side of Washington Avenue 335 feet south of 172nd Street (his residence), another on Willis Avenue near the corner of Third Avenue, and three on the corner of 103rd Street and Park Avenue.

In 1892, DeWitt Mull sold his residence at 1583 Washington Avenue in an area of New York City, New York, that later became part of the Bronx and the company does not appear to have existed after that year.
