= Hop-o'-Nose Knitting Mill =

- Hop-O-Nose Knitting Mill
- U.S. National Register of Historic Places
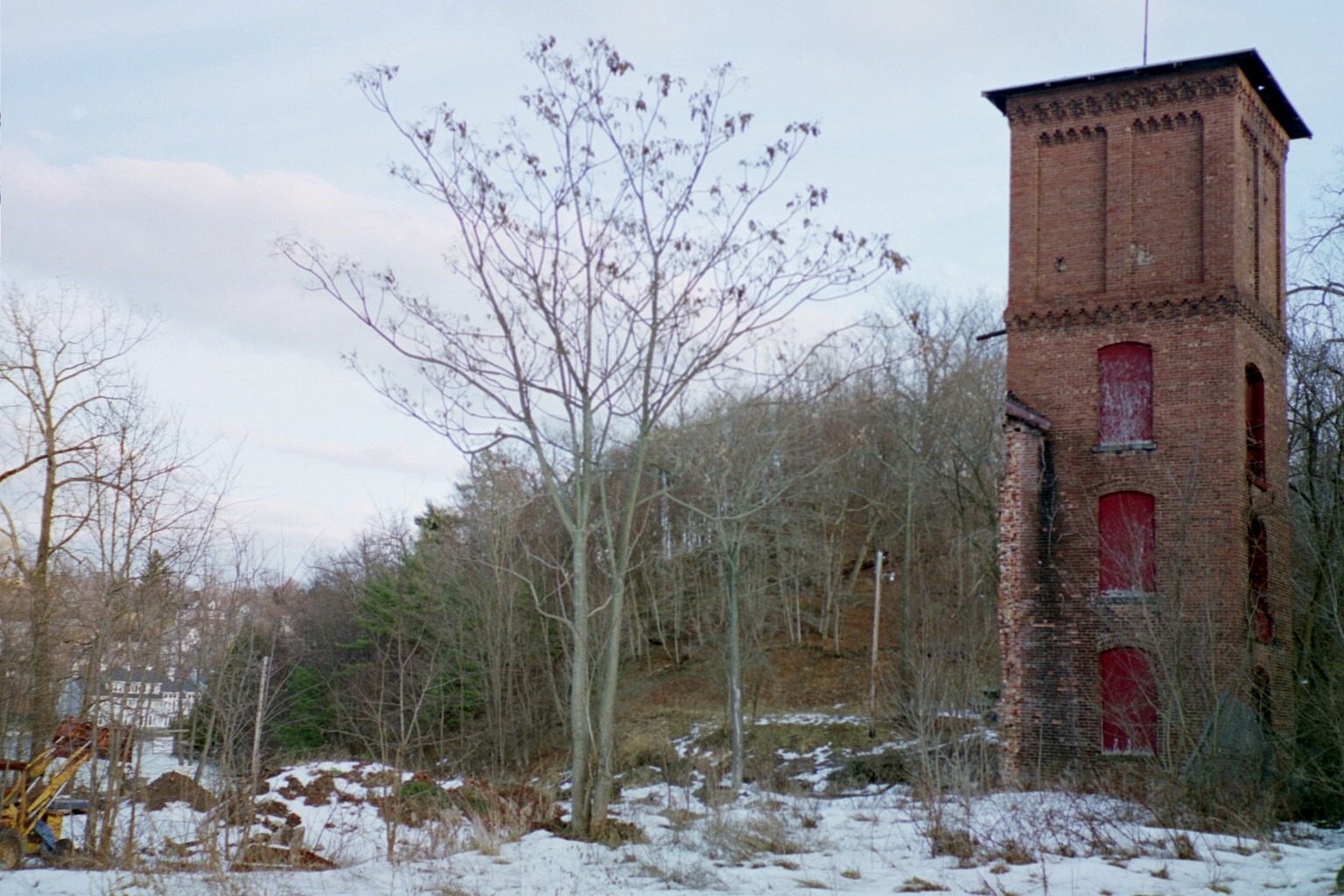
- Hop-o'-Nose Knitting Mill site

- Location within New York Location within the United States
- Location: Catskill, New York
- Coordinates: 42°12′46″N 73°52′1″W
- Built: 1881
- Architectural style: Romanesque
- NRHP reference No.: 95000959
- Added to NRHP: August 10, 1995

The Hop-o'-Nose Knitting Mill was a structure representative of the industrial history of Catskill, New York in the nineteenth century. The mill was built by Wolfe Bros., carpenters, and Mull & Fromer, Masons and Builders, in 1881 at 130 West Main Street. West Main Street is located on the western side of Catskill Creek, while East Main Street is on the eastern side of the creek. The mill was named to the National Register of Historic Places in 1995 as Hop-O-Nose Knitting Mill. It has since been demolished, with the exception of the tower, which remains overlooking a lot full of brick demolition debris.
