= Bull Durham Smoking Tobacco =

American brand of smoking tobacco

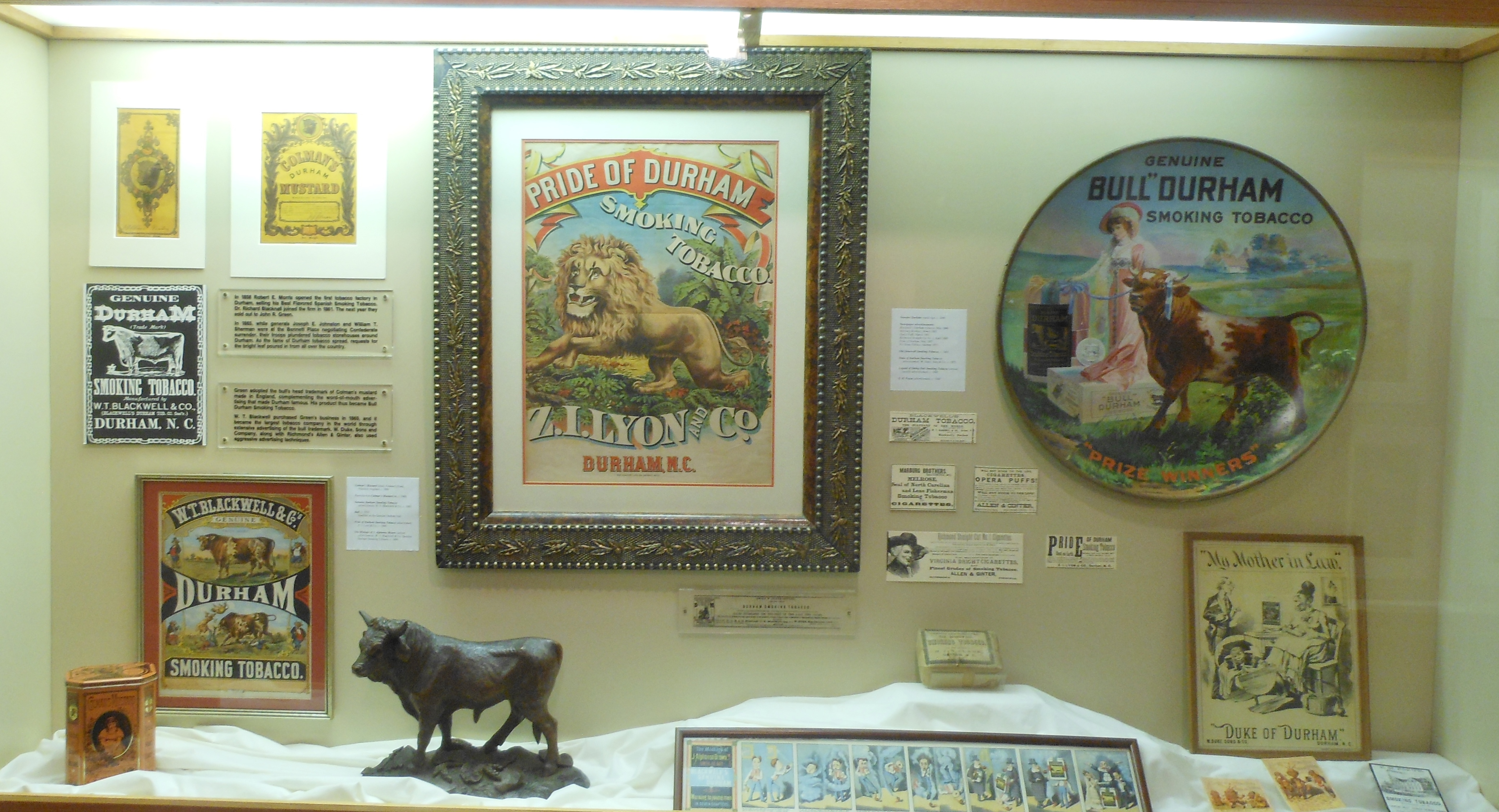
Classic advertisements of Bull Durham tobacco

Bull Durham Smoking Tobacco, also known as "Genuine Bull Durham Smoking Tobacco", was a brand of loose-leaf tobacco manufactured by W. T. Blackwell and Company in Durham, North Carolina, that originated around the 1850s and remained in production until August 15, 1988. Over the years, the brand often changed ownership yet continued to be one of the most successful tobacco brands. The brand is most commonly associated with its advertising campaigns. William Thomas Blackwell, an original investor and owner of the Blackwell Company, contributed greatly to the success of the product. Blackwell and his company's tactics with the brand paved the way for other corporations to succeed through the acquisition of the Bull Durham trademark. The success of the product is ultimately due to the successful advertising campaigns that made Durham world famous, brought jobs to the city, and made Durham the tobacco capital of the United States.

== History of W. T. Blackwell Company ==
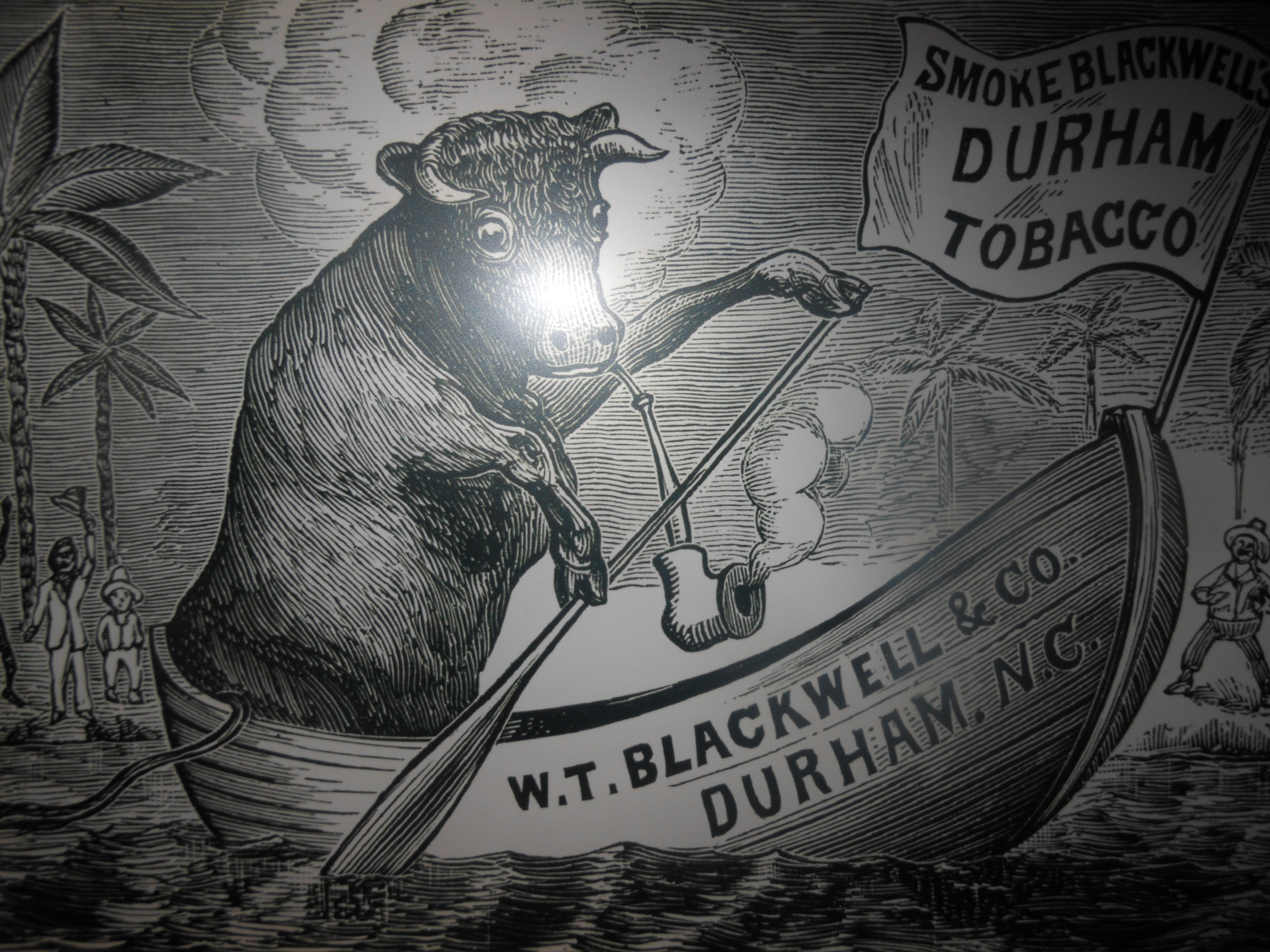
W. T. Blackwell & Company Caricature

=== The J. R. Green Company ===
John Ruffin Green, a tobacco peddler of the 1850s, owned and operated the J. R. Green Factory, the original place of production for Bull Durham. Green found moderate success in his own endeavors. The Civil War brought business to the Green Company when soldiers on both sides of the war used Green's tobacco. The brand then spread by word of mouth due to its popularity with the soldiers. Soon, his business grew to be bigger than he could manage by himself.

=== Start of the W. T. Blackwell Company ===
Green decided to expand his business in 1869, partnering with both Blackwell and James R. Day. This partnership made J. R. Green and Company a big name in the tobacco industry. Blackwell and Day originally paid 1500 dollars each for their shares in the company. Shortly after the initiation of the partnership, Green died from tuberculosis. After Green's death, Blackwell purchased Green's shares and the trademark for "Genuine Durham Smoking Tobacco" from the Green family for $2292. This purchase is the official beginning of the W. T. Blackwell Company.

In the following years, Blackwell and Day expanded further. The two owners partnered in 1878 with Julian Carr, a North Carolina native and UNC graduate, to create one-third ownership for each man. This partnership proved to make the new Blackwell Company a highly successful venture.

=== Blackwell Company booms ===
Blackwell, Day, and Carr's success can be attributed to the use of sound business practices, the creation and implementation of new technologies, and an extremely innovative advertising campaign. In the beginning years of the Blackwell Company, they did not have enough of a work force or big enough facilities to fulfill the huge demand for their product.

==== A new factory ====
The three owners increased the size of the company by building a factory for production. This factory was completed in 1874 and resided on the corner of Blackwell and Pettigrew Streets in Durham, North Carolina. This investment proved to be profitable for both the company and Durham. The factory brought more jobs to the city, creating a need for increased housing, public services, and other necessities. After the building of the factory, the business continued to boom, so much so that the factory had to be expanded in 1879, only five years after the original building went up.

==== Tobacco warehouses ====
In addition to the extensive factory, the firm purchased and implemented the first tobacco warehouse in Durham in 1871. The market ended up selling more tobacco than any other place in North Carolina during its years of operation. It brought tobacco farmers to the city and allowed the company to acquire more tobacco than it previously could. No longer needing to ship tobacco from Virginia, the company expanded easily, continuing to boost commerce in Durham. Their tobacco warehouse influenced others to start tobacco warehouses of their own, contributing greatly to the city's success with tobacco. By 1876, there were nine tobacco warehouses in Durham, making it the most popular place in North Carolina to sell tobacco.

==== New Technology ====
Additionally, the implementation of various technologies helped the company grow. An example of this is the invention and implementation of the “Bull Jack,” a machine that fills, labels, and weighs bags of tobacco. The “bow tier,” another invention, also improved the efficiency of production. John Thomas Dalton designed this machine to tie a bow around the tobacco filled bag, which reduced the annual cost of $172,000 for using manual labor to tie the bags by a third. These inventions allowed the firm to increase production to fulfill the high demand.

Around the end of the 1870s and early 1880s the Blackwell Company experienced remarkable success. In 1869 it produced around 60,000 pounds of tobacco per year; by 1883 it produced over five million pounds.

=== The Blackwell Co. and W. T. Blackwell change Durham ===
The Blackwell Company, the first big company to be located in Durham, sparked the tobacco craze within Durham.

W. T. Blackwell, called the "father of Durham" by Durham's first historian, changed Durham residents' lives during his time with the Blackwell Company. When Blackwell started the first tobacco warehouse, he "essentially built Durham into a center where tobacco farmers could bring their tobacco to be sold at high prices." The tobacco warehouse industry spurred the need for the first banks in Durham, which came about in 1878. Around this time, Blackwell also implemented the first telephones in Durham. The expansion of the tobacco industry gave rise to the need for a cotton industry and tobacco bag making companies, such as the Golden Belt Manufacturing Company. The firm's product, Bull Durham tobacco, gave rise to the city's nickname, The Bull City.

=== The partners separate ===
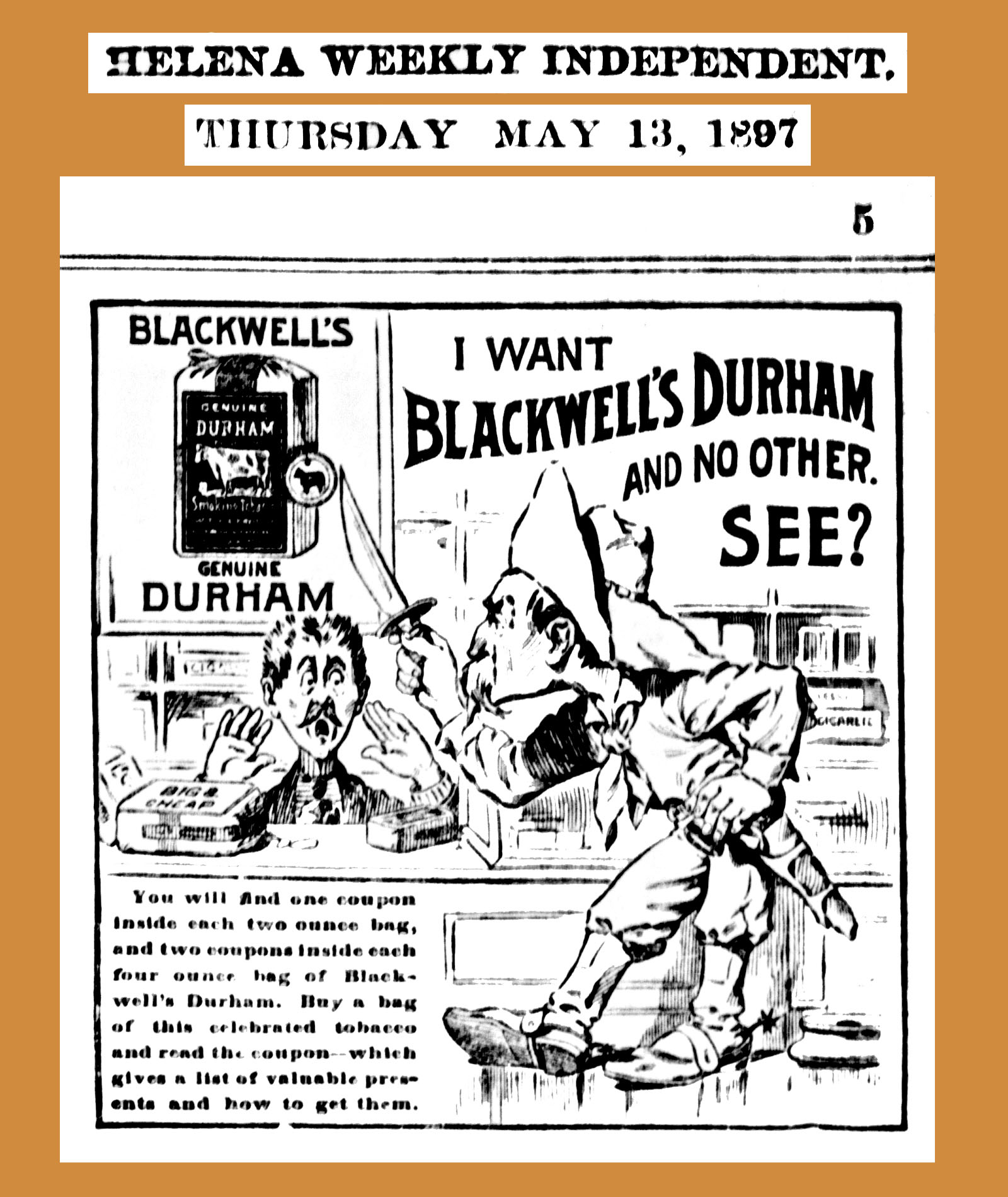
An 1897 newspaper display ad for Blackwell's Durham

Even though the company experienced high profitability, the three partners eventually fell apart and sold the company in order to pursue other ventures. This began when both Blackwell and Carr bought Day out of the company in 1878 for 50,000 dollars. Blackwell sold his shares next for a total of 300,000 dollars in 1883 to larger companies that would continue to promote the “Bull Durham” brand. Carr remained in the company and continued to encourage new advertising methods for Bull Durham. He eventually spread the brand to an unprecedented global level.

=== Blackwell Company and Bull Durham sold ===
Around the time when Blackwell left the company. Competition with the up-and-coming Duke firm headed by James “Buck” Duke arose. Carr, however, stuck with the company and, under his leadership, “successfully developed mass production, excelled in creative advertising, and established world-wide sales.” In 1898 Carr sold the majority of shares in the Blackwell Company and the rights to the “Bull Durham” brand to the Union Tobacco Company for 2,500,000 dollars, a price considered relatively cheap for the globally renowned brand Union acquired.

=== American acquires Bull Durham ===
Union Tobacco Company attempted to compete with the formed huge American Tobacco Company, a company formed out of the Duke firm, but found little success, and only a short while later was bought out by the American Tobacco Company. American then retained control of many of the most popular brands of tobacco and continued to develop the new advertising campaigns that are associated with Bull Durham Smoking Tobacco.

== Advertising the Bull Durham brand ==
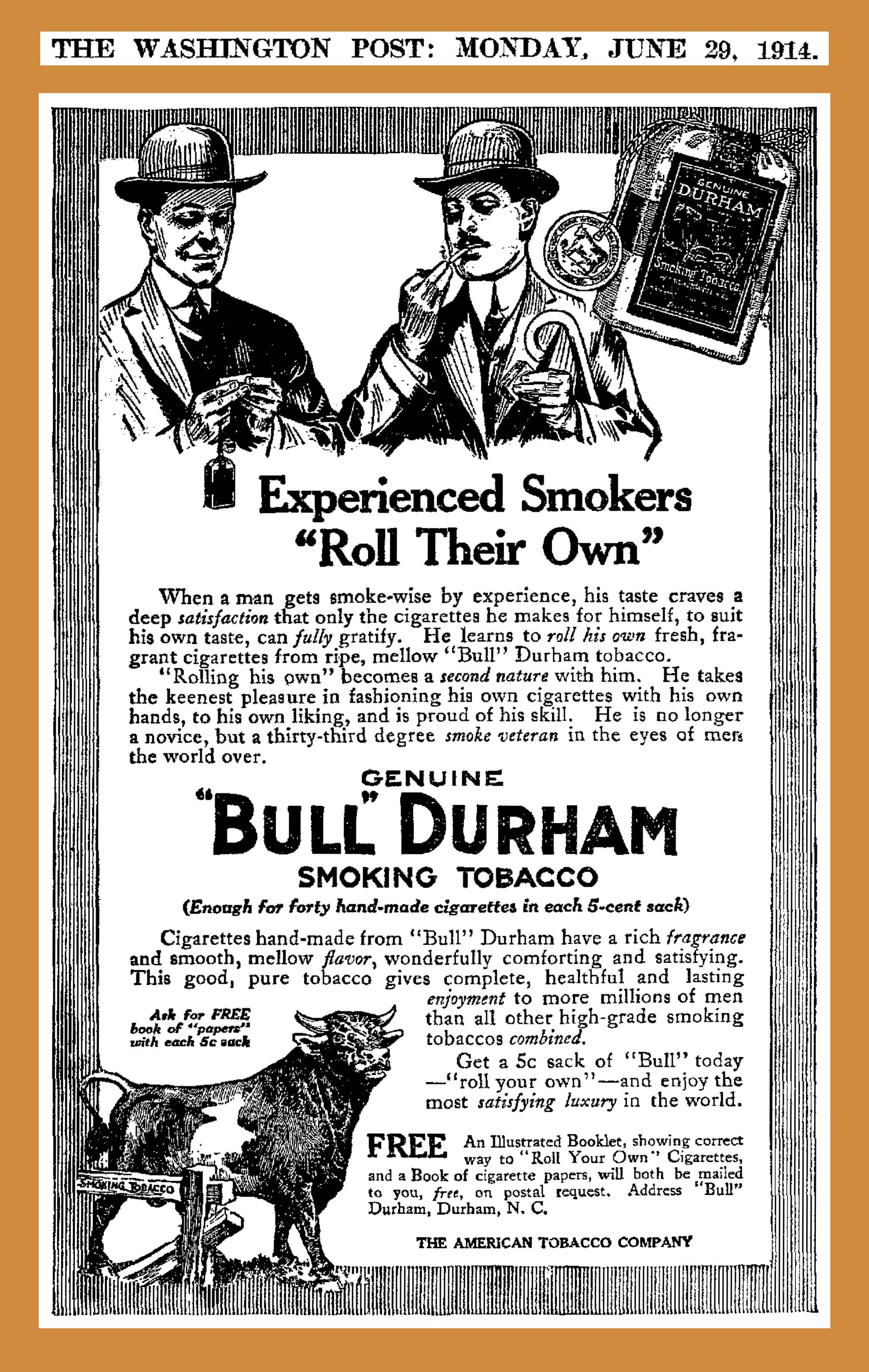
This 1914 display ad in The Washington Post appealed to the experienced smoker who prefers to roll his own cigarettes—the "thirty-third degree smoke veteran".

Bull Durham advertising represents the most expansive, revolutionary advertising campaign of its time. The Blackwell Company spent more money to advertise Bull Durham than any other company on any product. Large advertising campaigns at the time were considered to be extremely risky and fruitless in meriting more sales. Bull Durham ads proved this theory wrong, however, as the various campaigns became some of the most successful of the time and paved the way for modern-day advertising.

=== Bull Durham branding ===
Bull Durham Smoking Tobacco's advertising had success due to the extent to which the product was branded. Green and later the Blackwell Company established the bull as the logo for "Genuine Durham Smoking Tobacco" in order to help do this. The logo of the bull evidently comes from "Durham Mustard" containers from Durham, England. With the establishment of the logo, the Blackwell Company extended the branding idea, putting the bull logo on all advertisements and labels. This logo would eventually be "one of the most recognizable product advertisements around the country." Beyond the creation of the trademark icon, the "Established 1865" phrase appeared in association with Bull Durham. This helped to protect against trademark infringements, a very common occurrence due to the wild success of "Genuine Bull Durham Smoking Tobacco". The repetition of advertisements with the bull and an established line helped to brand the name and make Bull Durham familiar to people of all ages.

==== Racism in Bull Durham tobacco ads ====
Bull Durham tobacco was among the most recognizable trademarks in the world circa 1900. Ads include caricatures of "foolish looking or silly acting blacks to draw attention to its product".

=== Successful advertising campaigns ===
==== Repetition ====
The Blackwell Company advertised Bull Durham tobacco in an uncommon fashion for advertising of the time. One of the company’s first huge campaigns was the implementation of ads depicting the bull in magazines, trade journals, periodicals, and huge outdoor painted signs. The repetition of the bull and the wide circulation of these advertisements in a single newspaper or magazine quickly made the product a household name.

==== Outdoor advertising ====
In addition, the Blackwell Co. was among the first to implement a large-scale outdoor advertising campaign around the country. The company partnered with the New York Sign Company and hired skilled ad painter Jule Gilmer Körner, or "Rueben Rink", builder of the landmark home Korner's Folly, as head of advertising. These ads started in the late 1870s and consisted of giant depictions of the bull with catchy sayings or a depiction of the price. Rink hired four teams of painters to go around the states and constantly paint ads. These signs were placed on huge billboards along major roads and rails, on the side of various buildings, and any other place that would be regularly seen. This was done in hopes that spreading the name of the product and the continuity of the ads would increase sales.

==== Roll Your Own campaign ====
One of the most successful slogan campaigns for Bull Durham was the "Roll Your Own" campaign. The campaign came at an ideal time, as product sales were low due to the competition against the emerging pre-rolled cigarette. These ads appeared around the time of the Great Depression and showed the low price of only a nickel per bag as well as an elegant scene with finely dressed, upper class looking people. This advertisement campaign originally had doubters, yet quickly these doubts were taken away when sales exploded. The ads made many in the middle and lower class want to go out to buy Bull Durham in order to emulate the upper class. The campaign was tremendously successful, using the desire for a better life to boost sales.

==== Promotional campaigns ====
In addition to slogans the Blackwell Company used promotions to increase sales of Bull Durham Tobacco. One promotion Blackwell ran gave soap to the merchants that sold their product. The company offered a bar of soap for each pound of tobacco a salesman purchased or 30 bars of soap for every 25 pounds purchased. Merchants could offer promotions in their own store, sell the soap, or use the soap themselves. Salesmen bought Bull Durham in bulk in order to reap the rewards of the soap, in turn increasing the total sales of Bull Durham.

The Blackwell Company also ran a coupon campaign that offered “free” goods to the consumers of the Bull Durham brand. Coupons were included in every pack of Bull Durham Tobacco. After a consumer had saved up a set amount of coupons he or she could cash them in for an item of equivalent value. For example, for 100 coupons and one dollar one could get a gold plated watch. There were over 180 rewards each costing a different number of coupons. This advertising style was unique for its time and increased sales as people had double the incentive to buy the product. This style of advertising is still seen in companies today. The company and especially Carr used every angle of advertising they could think of in order to promote Bull Durham. These advertising techniques were completely unique for their time and many of the methods have greatly influenced modern day advertising.

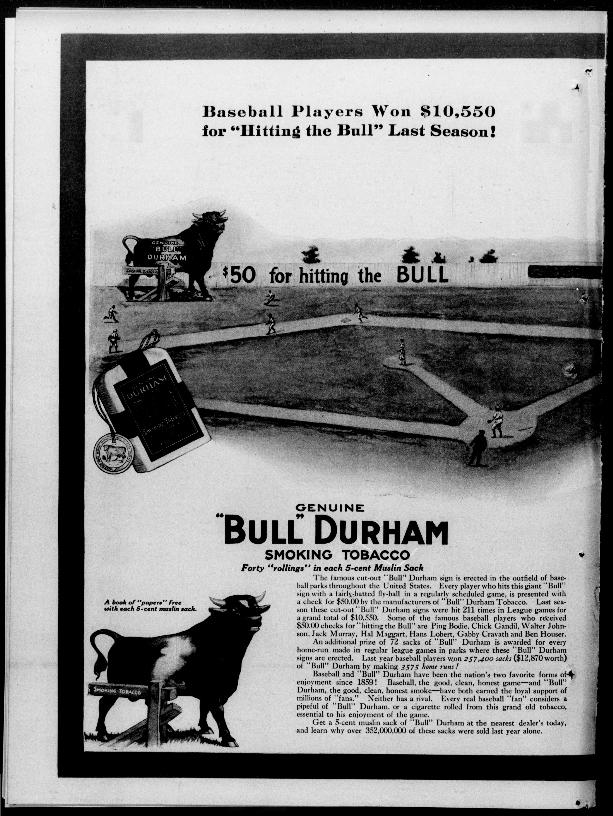
Hitting the Bull Campaign

=== Bull Durham and baseball ===
When the brand was in American Tobacco’s control, they continued Blackwell’s success with advertising and implemented even more innovative campaigns. To do this American Tobacco Co wisely made the connection between baseball, America’s favorite pastime, and tobacco. The connection came naturally, as during the early 1900s tobacco was a widely used amenity during games by the players. It is believed that this close link between Bull Durham and Tobacco may have triggered the creation of such words as bullpen. American Tobacco’s baseball advertisements made Bull Durham seem safe and familiar to baseball fans around the nation.

==== Hit the Bull campaign ====
American Tobacco also set up wooden bull ads in nearly every major league stadium around the states during the 1912 season, furthering Bull Durham's publicity. American gave a $50 prize (equivalent to $1,700 in 2025) to any player that hit the bull sign set up within the walls of the outfield. In addition, they offered free tobacco to any player who hit a home run. This advertising campaign generated much publicity and was highly successful, despite American Tobacco having to give away over $23,400 worth of goods. This, while a large sum of money for the time, is only about 5 cents given away to the baseball players for every 700 sacks of Bull Durham that were sold. The target audience, publicity generated, and consistency proved to make the "Hit the Bull" campaign an extremely successful venture.

=== Impact on the advertising industry ===
Before Bull Durham advertising, a large marketing campaign was unheard-of and considered highly risky. However, the Blackwell Co. and later American Tobacco proved this theory wrong entirely. The product achieved high sales and thus profit by creating a high demand for the product through advertising. The company showed future businesses the success that can come from branding a product and making it familiar to consumers. The advertising for Bull Durham proved to be a revolutionary process. Many of the concepts first used to advertise Bull Durham are still used by marketers today.
