= Cristo Rey Research Triangle High School =

Catholic high school in Durham, North Carolina

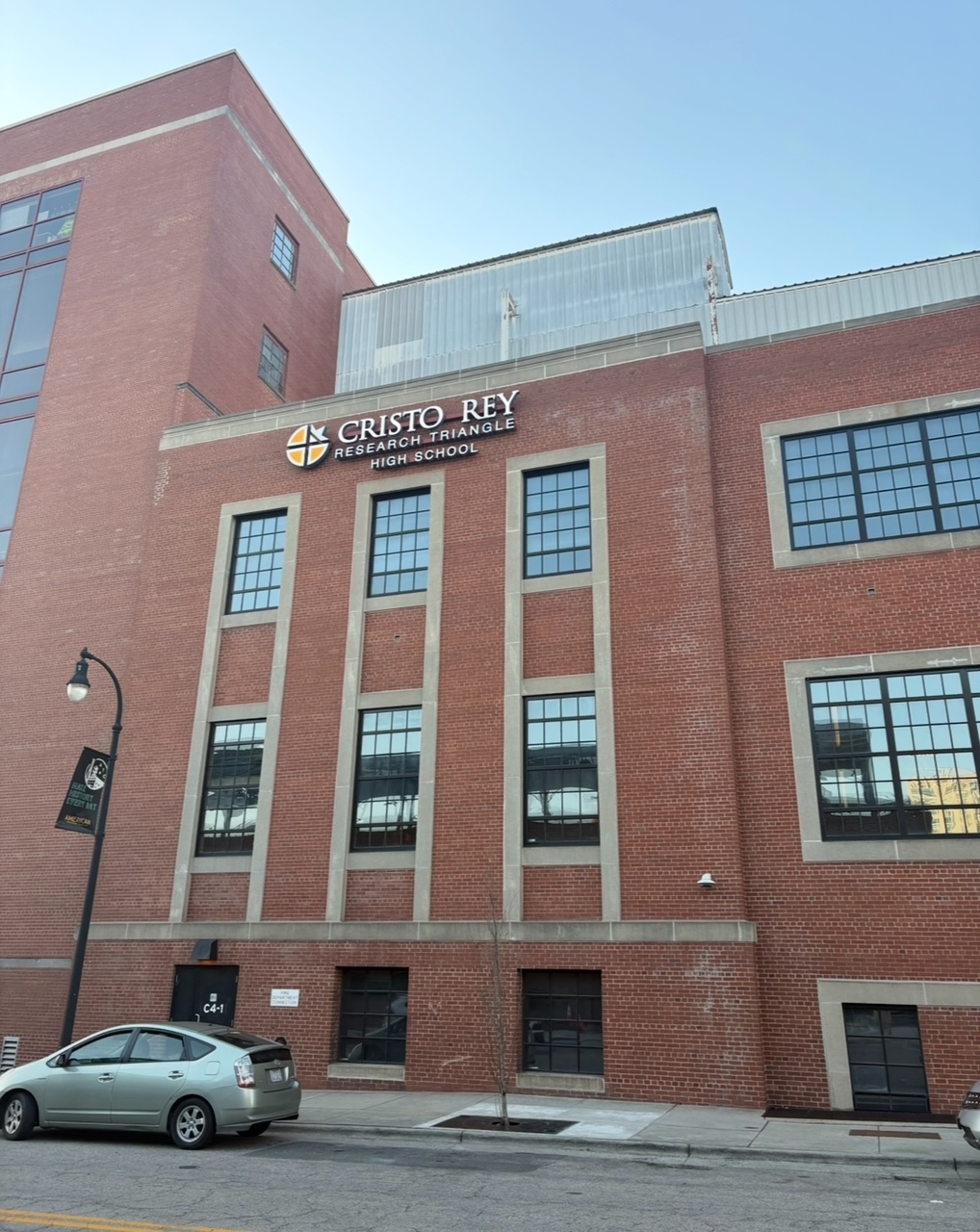
- The school in 2025

Location
- 334 Blackwell Street; Durham, North Carolina, U.S.
- 35.9928°N 78.9048°W

Information
- Religious affiliation: Catholic
- Established: 2019
- Founders: Cristo Rey Network
- Principal: Angel Sanks
- Grades: 9-12
- Gender: coeducational
- Enrollment: 250
- Affiliation: Society of Jesus
- Website: cristoreyrt.org

Cristo Rey Research Triangle High School is a Catholic high school in Durham, North Carolina. It is part of the Cristo Rey Network, a nationwide network of 40+ schools throughout the United States. The school is located in the American Tobacco Historic District in downtown Durham.

== History ==
The school was established in 2019 by the Cristo Rey Network to provide a college preparatory-style education for students from low-income backgrounds. It officially opened in 2021 and is supported by the Catholic Diocese of Raleigh. The student body is 70% Hispanic and 30% Latino.

== Location ==
Cristo Rey Research Triangle High School is located in the American Tobacco Historic District in downtown Durham.

== Academics ==
Classes are in session four days a week. The school partners with corporations, including Cisco, Wolfspeed, North Carolina State University, Lenovo, James Scott Farrin Law Firm, and Microsoft, that pay fifty percent of student tuition in exchange for work studies. Students may also have work studies in local elementary schools and nonprofits.

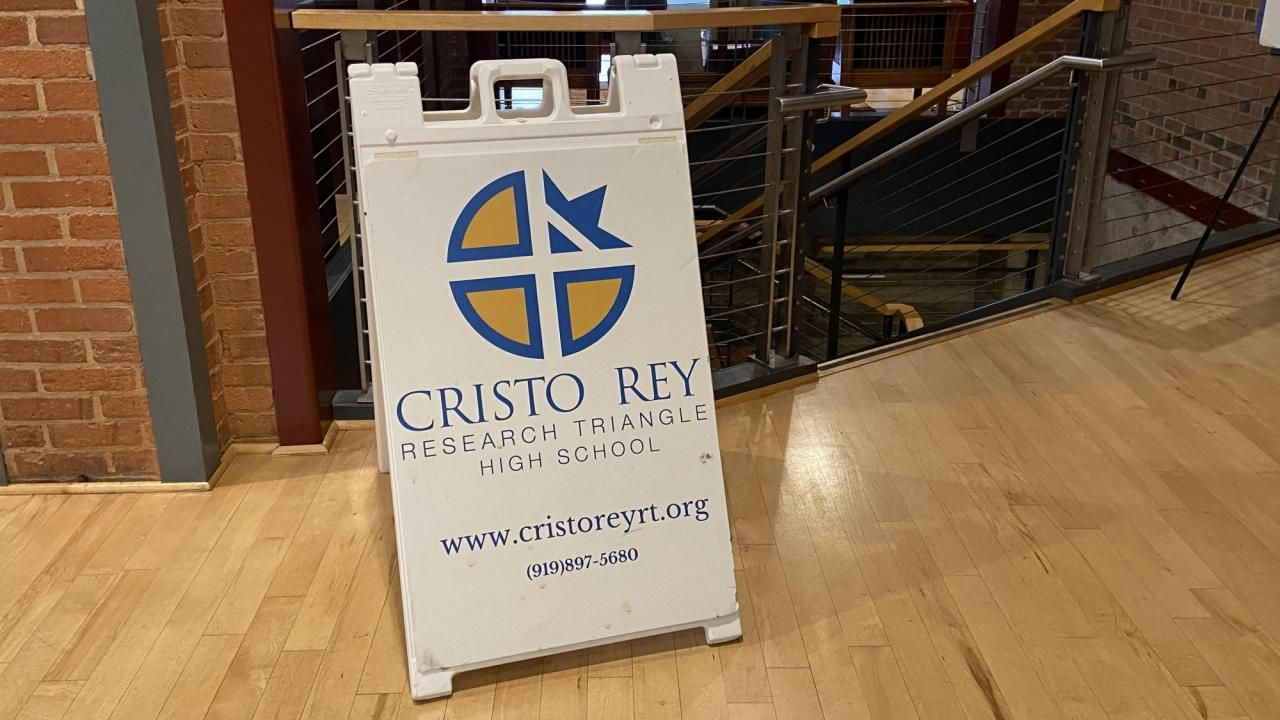
Cristo Rey Research Triangle High School's Logo at the American Tobacco Historic District
