= Stuyvesant station =

Historic train station in New York, USA (built 1880)

Stuyvesant
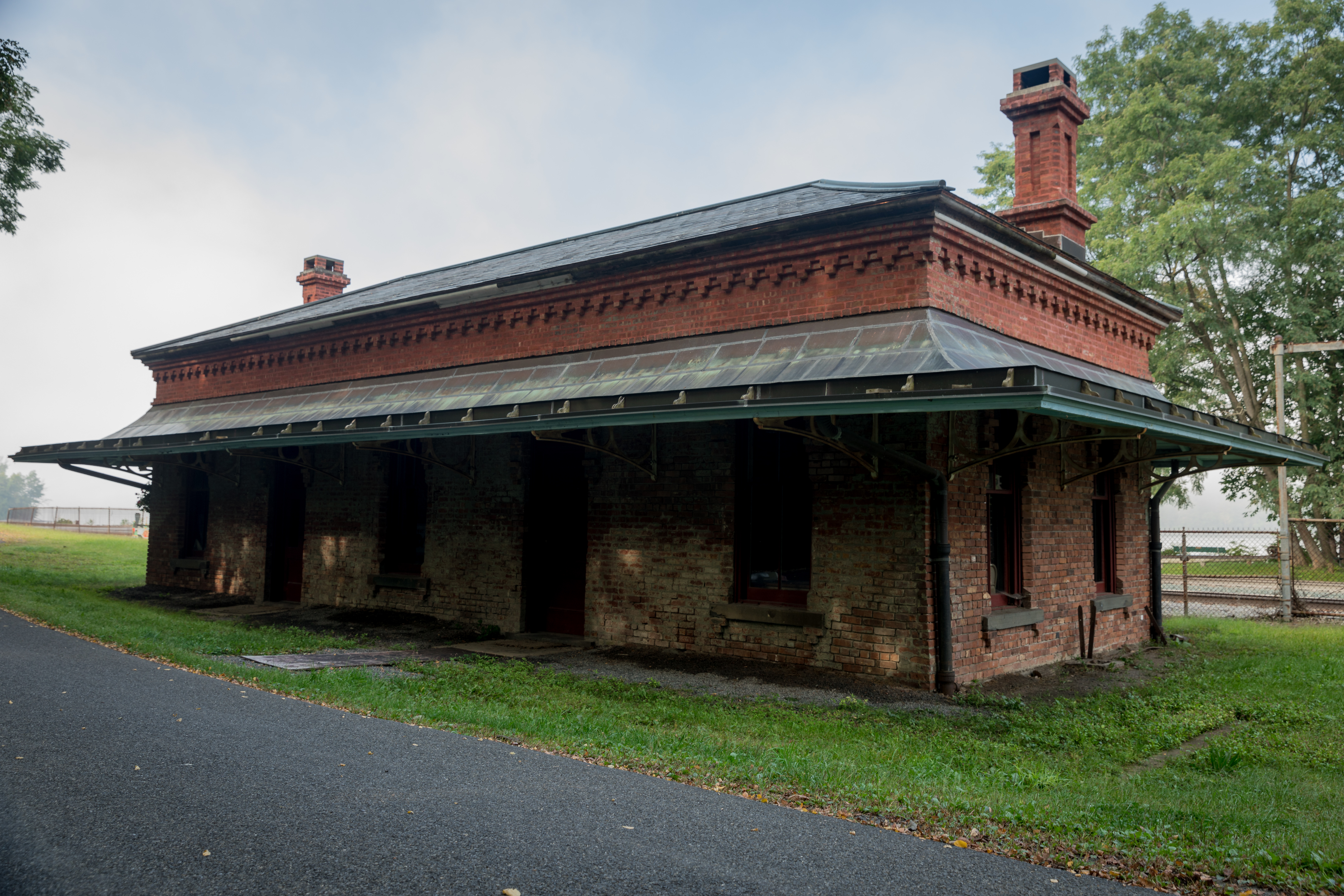

General information
- Location: Riverview Avenue, Stuyvesant, Columbia County, New York 12173

History
- Closed: c. 1965

Former services
Preceding station	New York Central Railroad	Following station
Schodack Landing toward Chicago	Main Line	Newton Hook toward New York
- Stuyvesant Railroad Station
- U.S. National Register of Historic Places
- Location within New York Location within the United States
- Location: Riverview Avenue, Stuyvesant, New York
- Coordinates: 42°23′20″N 73°47′1″W
- Area: less than one acre
- Built: 1881
- Architectural style: Italianate
- NRHP reference No.: 99000055
- Added to NRHP: January 27, 1999
Location

Stuyvesant station, also known as Stuyvesant Landing Depot, is a historic train station located in Stuyvesant, Columbia County, New York. It was built during the second half of 1880 after the original station was destroyed by a fire. Mull & Fromer, Masons and Builders, of Catskill, New York, secured the contract to rebuild the station and E. Lampman was their carpenter.

The station is a five bay brick building, 50 feet long and 20 feet wide, with a hipped roof. It features a molded and ornamented cornice and curved canopy. It was used along New York Central Railroad's Water Level Route and ceased to be used as a station in 1958. A single Hudson–Albany commuter round trip continued to stop until the mid-1960s.

It was listed on the National Register of Historic Places in 1999 as Stuyvesant Railroad Station. A local farmers market is held at the station.
