= American Tobacco Historic District =

Historic district in North Carolina, United States

- American Tobacco Company Manufacturing Plant
- U.S. National Register of Historic Places
- U.S. Historic district
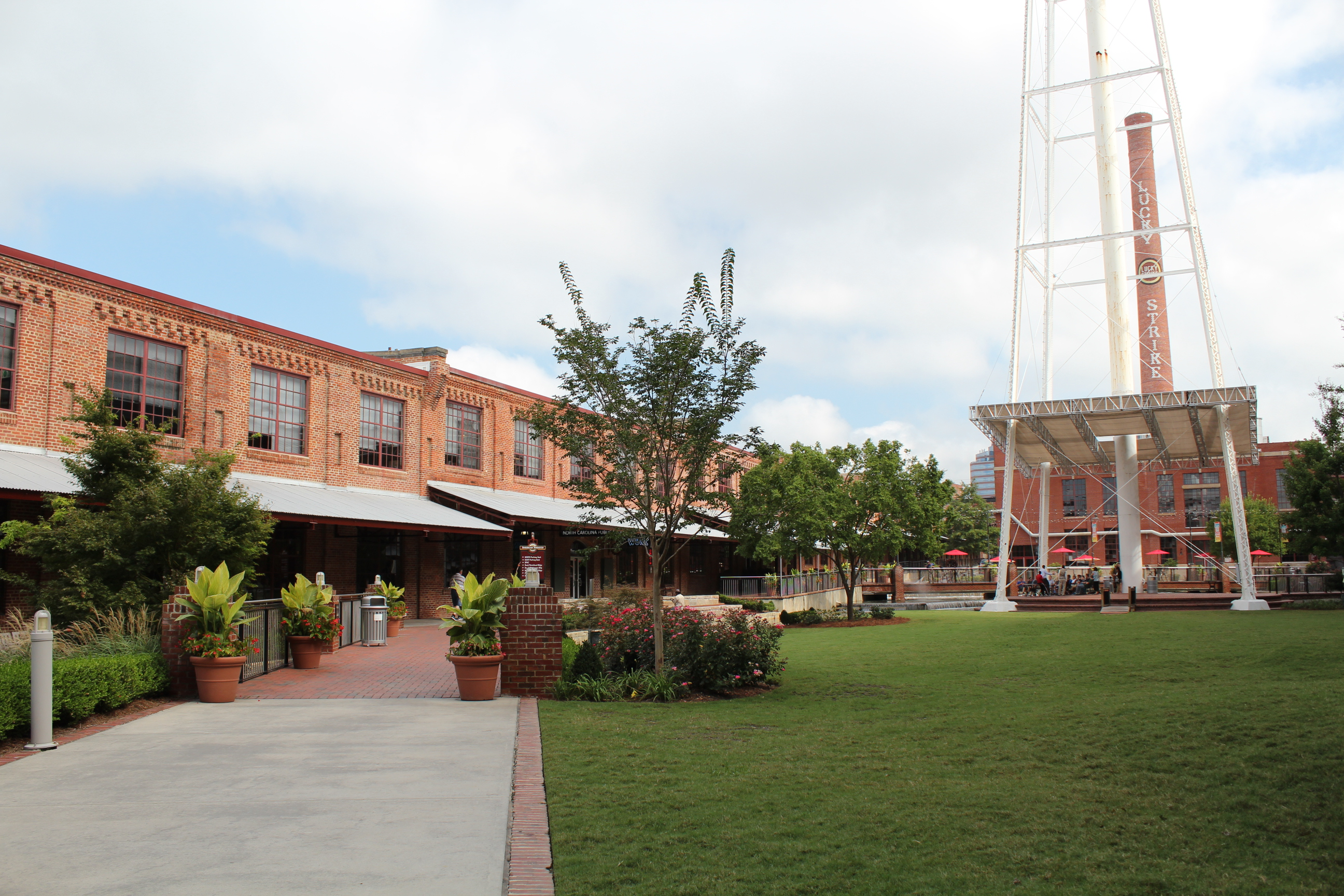
- American Tobacco Campus, September 2012

- Location within North Carolina Location within the United States
- Location: Roughly bounded by W. Pettigrew St., Blackwell St., Willard St. and Carr St., Durham, North Carolina
- Coordinates: 35°59′43″N 78°54′17″W
- Area: 14.6 acres (5.9 ha)
- Built: 1874, 1899, 1911
- Architectural style: Italianate, Romanesque, Art Moderne, et al.
- MPS: Durham MRA
- NRHP reference No.: 00001163
- Added to NRHP: September 29, 2000

The American Tobacco Historic District is a historic tobacco factory complex and national historic district located in Durham, Durham County, North Carolina. The district encompasses 14 contributing buildings and three contributing structures built by the American Tobacco Company and its predecessors and successors from 1874 to the 1950s. Located in the district is the separately listed Italianate style W. T. Blackwell and Company building (1874-1880, c. 1904). Other notable contributing resources are the Romanesque Revival style Hill Warehouse (1900), Washington Warehouse (1902–07), the Lucky Strike Building (1901–02), and Reed Warehouse; Noell Building (c. 1930); Power Plant and Engine House (1929–39); and the Art Moderne style Fowler (1939) Strickland (1946) and Crowe (1953) buildings.

It was listed on the National Register of Historic Places in 2000 as the American Tobacco Company Manufacturing Plant.

== Redevelopment ==
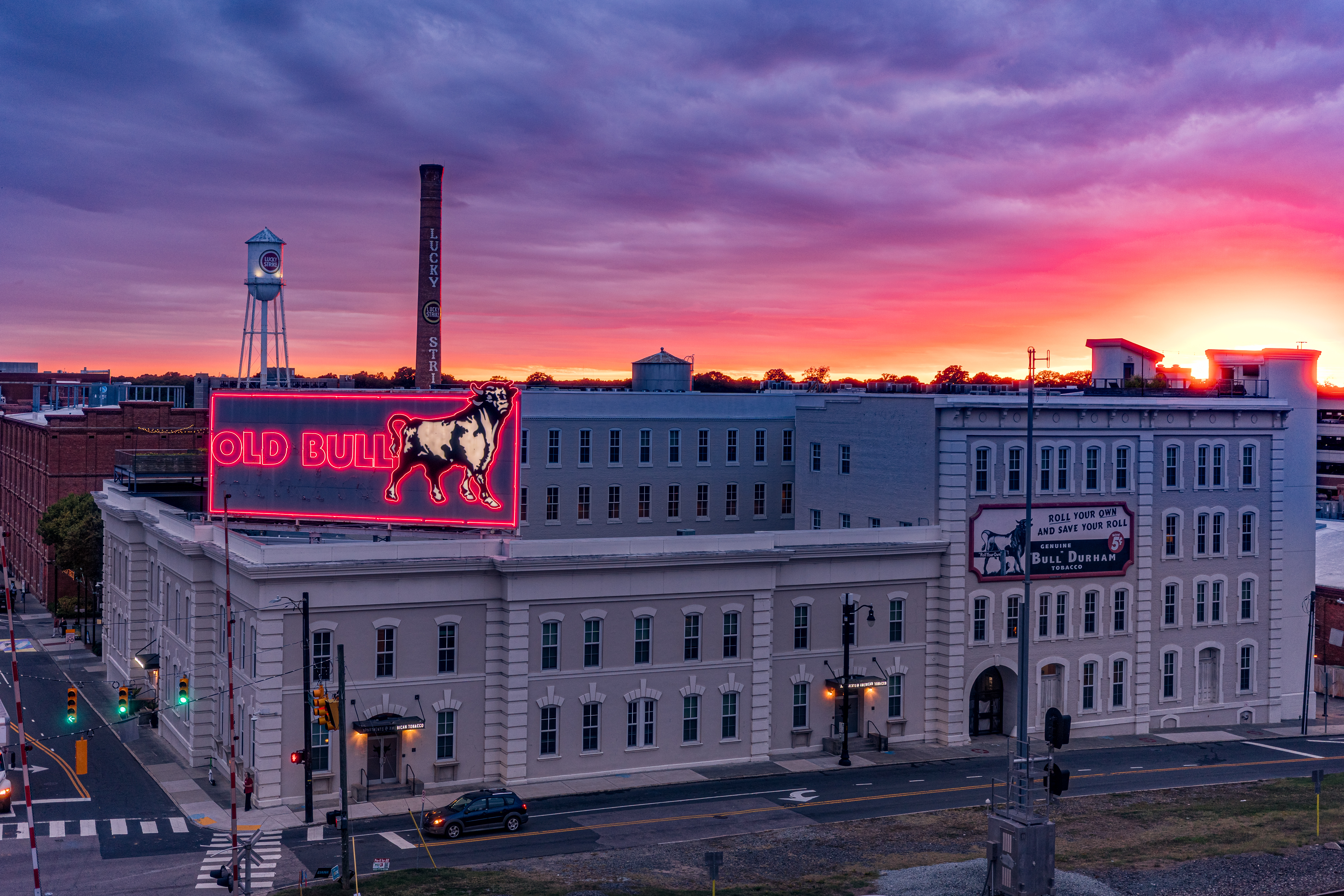
American Tobacco with Old Bull neon sign & Lucky Strike watertower

Nearby, but not part of the multi-use redevelopment district, is the Durham Bulls Athletic Park, the studios of Fox 50, and the Durham Performing Arts Center. The Historic District is part of a large urban renewal project in downtown Durham designed to bring residents, businesses, and shoppers to the formerly blighted downtown area. The campus had been the headquarters of the American Tobacco Company, once the largest manufacturer of cigarettes in the United States. The mostly abandoned campus was purchased by the Capitol Broadcasting Company in 2001 as part of a plan to redevelop downtown Durham. Other companies have completed similar plans, Measurement Incorporated purchased and renovated the Brodie Duke Warehouse, the Imperial Tobacco Warehouse, and BC Remedy Building. In 2021, Cristo Rey Research Triangle High School opened its doors in one of the buildings.
