= Julian S. Carr =

American industrialist and philanthropist

Julian Shakespeare Carr
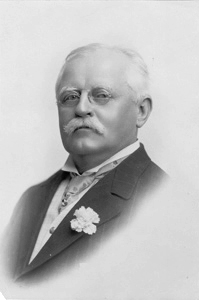
- Born: October 12, 1845; Chapel Hill, North Carolina
- Died: April 29, 1924 (aged 78); Chicago, Illinois
- Burial place: Maplewood Cemetery
- Other names: General Carr; Col. Carr "Jule" Carr
- Education: University of North Carolina at Chapel Hill (1911, Hon. LLD)
- Occupations: Industrialist; Banker; Philanthropist; Financier
- Known for: Bull Durham Smoking Tobacco; Financing the 1911 Chinese Revolution; Donating Duke University's East Campus; Namesake of Carrboro
- Title: President of W. T. Blackwell and co. President of the First National Bank of Durham; Mayor of Durham
- Board member of: Trinity College (Duke University), University of North Carolina, American University
- Spouse: Nannie Graham Parrish Carr
- Parent(s): John Wesley Carr, Eliza Bullock Carr
- Relatives: James William Cannon (in-law), Charlie Soong (godson)

Julian Shakespeare Carr (October 12, 1845 – April 29, 1924) was an American tobacco and textile industrialist best known for his work establishing "the first major brand-name [tobacco] product" Bull Durham Tobacco and pioneering the world's first international, mass-market advertising campaign.

He helped finance the 1911 Chinese Revolution, providing his godson Charlie Soong, Soong Ching-ling, and Sun Yat-sen over one million dollars.

He is the only individual to serve on the board of trustees for both Duke University (then Trinity College) and the University of North Carolina.

He is the namesake of Carrboro, North Carolina, and Carr Township.

== Early life ==
Carr was the son of Chapel Hill merchant John Wesley Carr and Eliza P. Carr (née Eliza Pannill Bullock). Carr's father "did not grow up on a plantation," and his grandfather who was also named John Carr "was a yeoman farmer without wealth or influence, but with an impressive lineage" that traces back to Robert Carr, Earl of Somerset. Unlike his chief business rival, fellow Confederate Veteran, and namesake of Duke University Washington Duke, Julian Carr never owned slaves.

In 1862, he entered the University of North Carolina at Chapel Hill at the age of sixteen, where he developed a life-long friendship with Eugene Morehead, son of North Carolina governor John Motley Morehead.

In 1863, Carr became eighteen and "decided to enlist" in the Confederate Army, becoming a member of Company K in the Third North Carolina Cavalry.

== Career ==
After the war, he resumed his university education. Subsequently, he spent two years working in business with his uncle in Little Rock, Arkansas. Upon his return to North Carolina, Carr purchased one-third of the Durham-based tobacco company W. T. Blackwell and Company, eventually becoming the firm's president and sole owner. His work as the chief marketer made the Bull Durham Tobacco brand famous which later influenced many facets of both Durham and baseball culture, including the town nickname "Bull City," the term bull pen, and the movie Bull Durham.

Carr became one of the state's wealthiest individuals and North Carolina's first millionaire, engaging in successful textile, banking (Durham's First National Bank), railroad, public utility (Electric Lighting Company), and newspaper endeavors.

In 1909, Carr purchased the Alberta Cotton Mill from Thomas F. Lloyd in what was then called West End, North Carolina, by Chapel Hill. In 1913, after agreeing to extend electricity to the town, it was named Carrboro in honor of him. In the 1970s, the mill, abandoned for many years, was restored and opened as Carr Mill Mall.

== Philanthropy ==
=== Charlie Soong and the 1911 Chinese Revolution ===
Carr was instrumental in the Western education of Charlie Soong, Duke's first international student and founder of the Soong Dynasty. Carr financed Soong's Shanghai Bible-publishing business. Soong was active in Sun Yat-sen's attempts to establish a modern republic in China.

==== The Carr family's adoption and education of Charlie ====
In the 1880's the Carr family took in the young Soong, making him a part of their family and providing him a room of his own in their mansion Waverly Honor. Carr paid for Soong's education, starting at Trinity College (now Duke University) and later at Vanderbilt University Divinity School.

==== Funding the 1911 Chinese Revolution ====
As an adult, Soong returned to America where he raised over $2,000,000 for the Alliance party (Tongmenghui), with Carr providing the majority of the funds. Soong and Carr's efforts significantly contributed to the success of the 1911 Revolution and the Kuomintang's subsequent rule of China and later Taiwan.

Following the revolution, Carr travelled to Shanghai where Sun Yat-sen and Soong Ching-ling hosted him at their residence (see Former Residence of Yat-Sen) in the French Concession. The leadership of the newly formed government honored Carr with multiple banquets, and Sun gifted Carr three porcelain vases. Carr remarked in letters home, "They treated me like royalty--like a king."

=== The Spanish–American War ===
During the Spanish–American War of 1898, Carr personally backed two companies of soldiers, one white and one black, each comprising roughly 120 soldiers each. Carr contributed over $100,000 to these men and their families: He paid the bills of the soldiers' families at home in North Carolina and personally travelled down to Jacksonville, Florida, to deliver the commanding officer of the 1st North Carolina Regiment $25,000.

=== Trinity College (now Duke University) ===
==== Early financial assistance to Trinity College ====
Carr was instrumental in the founding of Duke University. As Trinity College struggled to overcome postwar dependency on uncertain student tuition and church donations, interested Methodist laymen were crucial to its survival. Carr's name first appears in college records signing a note to forestall foreclosure on a mortgage due in 1880.

==== Trustee, administrator, and donor of Duke's Campus ====
Carr was elected a trustee of Trinity College in 1883, and over the course of the decade acted as benefactor and administrator of the struggling institution that was eventually renamed Duke University. He engineered the selection of John F. Crowell as the institution's new president, and along with Washington Duke won support to remove the school from its rural setting in Randolph County, North Carolina, to Durham. The move was made possible by Carr's gift of his 62 acres (250,000 m^{2}) Trinity Park for the grounds of Duke's original campus (today East Campus).

==== Carr Building (Duke) ====
Following Carr's death in 1924, Duke University formally named a large building on its East Campus the Carr Building in 1930:

"In memory of Julian S. Carr, who gave the land on which these buildings stand. ERECTED BY JAMES B. DUKE." "General Julian S. Carr, of Durham...who responded to the financial needs of the institution and who in other ways meant much to the college, will be permanently honored..."

The building designed by architect Horace Trumbauer is a "three-story Georgian style red Baltimore brick building, trimmed in Vermont marble, and with a Buckingham slate roof." Originally housing the Fine Arts Department, today it is home to the History Department. In 2018, Duke renamed Carr Building the Classroom Building.

=== University of North Carolina ===
==== Carr Building (UNC) ====
Carr personally funded the construction of the Carr Building, originally named the Carr Dormitory, at the University of North Carolina at Chapel Hill, making it the first building on campus gifted by a single donor. At the time, his gift was the largest ever given to UNC. The Carr Building opened in 1900, and the building was renamed in 2020.

==== Alumni Association ====
Carr (class of 1886) served as the President of the UNC General Alumni Associate Board of Directors from 1912 to 1917.

==== Silent Sam ====
Carr was the largest single donor to the Silent Sam monument to Confederate alumni on the UNC-Chapel Hill campus. At its dedication in 1913, Carr, among other topics in the speech, told a story from when he was 19 years old, "less than ninety days perhaps after my return from Appomattox," in which he performed the "pleasing duty" of whipping an African-American "wench" until her skirts hung in shreds", because she had "publicly insulted and maligned a Southern lady." This passage received a great deal of attention starting in 2011, after it was rediscovered in the university archives by a graduate student in history named Adam Domby and published in the campus newspaper, The Daily Tar Heel. It contributed significantly to the discontent that culminated in the toppling of the statue on August 20, 2018.

Prior to Dr. Adam Domby making Carr's 1913 speech well-known, which ultimately triggered the civil unrest on UNC's campus, Carr's reputation was not one of racism. Carr's status as a beloved historical and cultural figure in the State of North Carolina was recognized through a state-wide holiday enacted by the legislature named Julian Carr Day, and in 1992 Duke University hosted a reunion for the Washington Duke and Julian Carr families to honor their moving of Duke University (then Trinity College) to Durham.

=== American University ===
Carr was one of the founders of American University, helping enacting its 1893 charter still in effect today and serving on the board of trustees from 1921 to 1924.

=== Bolstering Durham's Black Wall Street ===
==== Booker T. Washington ====
In 1915, Booker T. Washington, described Carr as a generous "white man." Washington detailed Carr's early investment in the career of former-slave John Merrick who became the most successful black business leader in Durham, Carr's role as one of the first business leaders to hire black operators, and his providing of training for black workers for a black-owned neighboring mill:

"Mr. John Merrick, recognized as the leading Negro of Durham... began as a poor man, borrowing money from General Julian S. Carr, a leading white man, to begin his first business...the white people, and the best ones too, never feared...to aid them in securing an education or any kind of improvement....there is [a hosiery mill] owned by a white man, but operated exclusively by colored men. The proprietor is Gen. Julian S. Carr, to whom I have already referred. General Carr employs 150 women and a few men, and it argues the generous spirit typical here that he was willing to admit a rival Negro mill right here in his neighborhood; many of whose workmen had received their training from him."

==== W. E. B. Du Bois ====
In 1912, W. E. B. Du Bois wrote, "great as has undoubtedly been the value of the active friendship of...General Julian S. Carr," regarding the advancement of Durham's black citizens.

=== Woman's suffrage movement ===
Carr was noted in Volume VI of The History of Woman Suffrage for his encouragement of the formation of the Equal Suffrage League of North Carolina: "At this time, when it was far from popular to stand for this cause, Judge Walter Clark, Chief Justice of the Supreme Court; Gen. Julian S. Carr, Archibald Henderson, Wade Harris and E.K. Graham acted as an Advisory Committee and gave freely of their time and money to help the League."

=== Confederate veterans ===
A long-time advocate for the welfare of Confederate veterans, the "high-private," as he liked to refer to himself, held the position of commander for the North Carolina division of the United Confederate Veterans from 1899 to 1915. He later ascended to the leadership of the national organization in 1921. The Durham chapter of the United Daughters of the Confederacy is named the Julian S. Carr Chapter. In 1908, when a former judge wrote a newspaper article criticizing the Ku Klux Klan of Reconstruction days, Carr responded to the article by defending the Klan and admitting that he himself had been a member of the KKK during Reconstruction. In April 1923, while giving the keynote address at the annual convention of the United Confederate Veterans being held in New Orleans, Carr proudly announced that he was now a member of the recently reestablished Ku Klux Klan, which had formed again in Georgia in 1915.

=== Public library ===
Carr donated the land for North Carolina's first public library.

=== U.S. Food Administration ===
Carr served as the representative for the Methodist Episcopal Church South to the United States Food Administration during World War I.

== Politics ==
=== State and local ===
Carr was the acting Mayor of Durham, North Carolina in 1873. In 1880, Carr was nominated for Lieutenant Governor of North Carolina.

=== National ===
==== 1900 U.S. Senate campaign ====
Carr was a candidate in the 1900 Democratic primary for senator, running on a platform of free silver.

==== Nomination for vice president ====
Carr was nominated for Vice President of the United States by delegates from North Carolina (and one from Montana) at the 1900 Democratic National Convention, at which he gave a speech. He later served as a delegate to the 1912 Democratic National convention.

=== Promoting "Lost Cause" politics ===
Julian Carr bolstered the "Lost Cause" in North Carolina. Carr promoted his political views through The News & Observer newspaper, which he bought, setting up Josephus Daniels as its editor. He voiced support for the 1898 Wilmington massacre, and, while "at times [he] condemned extralegal mob violence, he also sympathized with the motivations of lynch mobs."

== Personal life ==
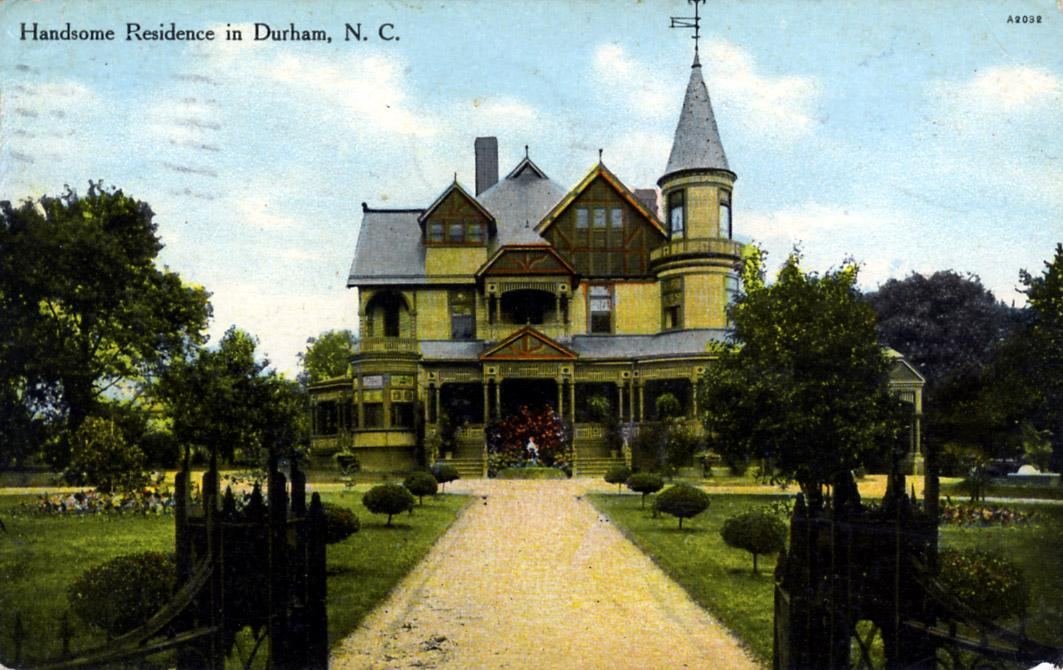
Somerset Villa, Carr's Durham mansion

He married Nannie Graham Parrish, daughter of Colonel D.C. Parrish, in 1873. They had four sons and two daughters. Their main residence, Somerset Villa, was "an ornament to Durham." The Carrs owned a secondary residence, a plantation in Hillsborough called Poplar Hill.

Later in life, he was known as "General Carr," the unofficial rank having been bestowed by the state veterans' association due to his long service in veterans' affairs and generosity toward widows and their children.

In 1923, UNC bestowed Carr an honorary doctor of law (LLD) degree.

== Death ==
Julian Carr died at his daughter's home in Chicago on April 29, 1924.

Carr's funeral was one of the largest and most attended in Durham's history, "with 20,000 people lining the streets."

United States President Calvin Coolidge telegraphed Carr's children his condolences saying,

"I have learned with deep regret the death of your distinguished father, General Julian S. Carr. I had grown to have high admiration for him and remember well speaking with him at the dedication of the Grant Monument in Washington, D.C. Mrs. Coolidge joins me in expressions of sincerest sympathies for your great loss."

Many black citizens of Durham expressed their sympathy following Carr's death with a statement in the News & Observer published on May 2, 1924:

"Throughout Durham, the people are depressed because of the death of one who was so greatly admired by all classes. Numerous resolutions of sympathy have been adopted. One set was adopted at a mass meeting of colored people as follows: 'Be it resolved that we, the colored citizens of this community, do give sincere thanks to Almighty God for the kindess and help that have come to us through the life of General Julian S. Carr...And we do herewith tender to his bereaved family heartfelt sympathy and sincere gratitude, such gratitude as can come only from those who in the midst of their greatest suffering have lost a true friend.'"

== Conflicting assessments on Carr's legacy (2018–2020) ==
=== Carr the philanthropist and business leader ===
As early as 1889 Carr had been described as "the foremost man in North Carolina", his name "a household word." When running for Senator in 1900, an editorial said that "with a large purse. a liberal heart and a ready hand, he has contributed more to the educational and charitable institutions of North Carolina than any other man in the state." At the centennial of his birth in 1945, President of the North Carolina College for Negroes (today's North Carolina Central University) James E. Shepard was quoted as having said that "I have never known the first time for him to fail to give to any enterprise which he thought would benefit the colored people or to lend his influence in their behalf… He put his time and money into the effort to establish that institution, and no call upon him was ever made in vain. I have known scores and scores of colored people who were the recipients of his kindness and generosity. I, too, was a recipient of the same. I never knew a cause, as stated above, to be in vain. I have never known a colored person too poor or ignorant who went to General Carr for assistance who did not receive the same."

In 1962, Durham mayor W. F. Carr (a nephew) described him as "a philanthropist without stint, a soldier without fear, a churchman without apology, a citizen without self-interest, a leader without tyranny, a follower humble enough to follow good leaders." He added that "he contributed liberally of his wealth to churches, schools, and universities, including the stately Methodist church on Chapel Hill Street, and the Trinity Methodist Church in up-town Durham; Trinity College (Duke since 1934), Davidson, Wake Forest, Saint Mary's, Elon, Greensboro College. Additionally, Carr extended financial support for the North Carolina College for Negroes, now known as North Carolina Central University, and to the Training School for Colored People located in Augusta, Georgia." He was chairman of the board of trustees of what is now North Carolina Central University.

=== Carr the segregationist ===
In 1999, University of North Carolina alumnus Sam Shaefer opined in the Raleigh News & Observer that,

"Carr ... over the course of his life vigorously promoted and fought for some of the worst causes in human history – racial chattel slavery, racial segregation and white supremacy, and the restriction of political power to a small class of wealthy people. In our present, when we are faced with the enormity of the consequences of the ideology of racism, the monstrosity of unfettered capitalism, and active threats to the realistically very weak institutions of democracy that we hold on to, the idea of venerating Carr is the worst kind of apologia."

==== Dispute over Carr's historical legacy ====
During the dispute about that University's Silent Sam confederate monument, Peter Coclanis, Albert R. Newsome Distinguished Professor of History at UNC-Chapel Hill, and William Sturkey, Assistant Professor of History at UNC-Chapel Hill, disagreed in a series of op-ed pieces in The Herald-Sun. Coclanis opined that "Carr, alas, was an ex-Confederate, and a man of his times, whose personal 'allusion' during a 1913 address in Chapel Hill—uttered when he was 67 years old—has made him a reviled figure among many people today. This is unfortunate and somewhat unfair in my view, however one feels about Silent Sam.... People are more than the worst thing they have done in their lives."

Sturkey responded that,

"Coclanis ... inaccurately portrays Carr as an otherwise generous philanthropist, unfairly vilified over a single bad moment or poor choice of words. * * * Julian Carr’s broader body of work indicates a long career of vile and violent white supremacism.... In the broader view, Carr’s life was filled with abhorrent activities and rhetoric that are not only deplorable today, but were illegal and belligerent in his own time. Carr committed treason against the United States of America, advocated the murder and disfranchisement of African Americans, and helped lead a racially divisive and violent political campaign that shattered democracy in North Carolina for over 60 years. Julian Carr was not merely 'a man of his times,' but rather an architect of his times. He was an enemy of enlightenment and democracy whose rhetoric and actions, both then and now, cast dark shadows over the civil and political life of the state and retard our ability to move forward from the legacies of slavery and Jim Crow."

In the final piece, Coclanis wrote,

"I do not disagree with Sturkey's contention that Carr was a white supremacist and thus racist by our standards. That said, I fail to understand his larger point. The vast majority of white southerners – indeed, white Americans – during the period in which Carr lived were white supremacists and racists by our standards. The vast majority did not, however, make pioneering innovations in business, did not bring about profound changes in the economy, and did not provide opportunities for generations of people (some of whom were African-American) to raise their living standards. Carr was exceptionally philanthropic to numerous causes and institutions.... History is tragedy, not melodrama, and all of us have feet of clay. Martin Luther, especially in his later writings, was clearly anti-Semitic; Martin Luther King Jr. was a notorious philanderer and a plagiarist to boot. George Washington was a slave-owner; Abraham Lincoln was by our standards racist and white supremacist. Do they deserve to be disappeared too? Pace Mr. Sturkey, the answer is no. These men were four of the greatest beings in our history. Though hardly in their league, Julian Carr, on balance, was a force for good and deserves honorable remembrance too."

=== Removal of Carr's name ===
During the late 2010s through 2020, "'Carr-washing' became a popular trend in Durham and Chapel Hill, defined as the removal of Julian Carr's name from prominent buildings that he either donated or had been honored by, such as the Durham Performing Arts Center.

- The Durham Board of Education voted to remove Julian Carr's name from a building (the former Central Junior High School) at the Durham School of the Arts and to adopt a new dress code specifically prohibiting items that "intimidate other students on the basis of race."
- The Duke University History Department, after the toppling of Silent Sam and the attention it gave to Carr's words, asked that Carr Hall, which houses the department, be renamed. Duke President Vincent Price called for a formation of a committee of students and faculty to examine options for a new understanding of Carr, his white supremacy, and his early support for Duke University. The committee held three meetings and sought comments from the Duke community, the "vast majority" of which favored renaming. On December 1, 2018, on the recommendation of the committee, the board of trustees voted to remove Carr's name from the building and temporarily returned the Hall to its original name, "Classroom Building", until a new name is decided upon.
- A petition has circulated calling for the town name of Carrboro to be changed. According to Alderwoman Jacquie Gist, "Changing Carrboro's name is not a realistic option", but the town of Carrboro is planning to erect a plaque "acknowledging namesake Julian Carr's racist remarks".
- In May 2020, the University of North Carolina at Chapel Hill's Carr Hall was renamed the "Henry Owl Building", which houses student affairs and administrative offices. Henry Owl was a member of the Eastern Band of Cherokee Indians and the first student of color to attend the university.

== Legacy ==
- Providing the land for Duke University's original Durham campus (now East Campus)
- Setting the standards for international, mass-marketing
- Financing the 1911 Chinese Revolution
- "Bull City" nickname for Durham
- The bullpen, the Durham Bulls, and the movie Bull Durham
- The city of Carrboro, North Carolina.
- Duke University's Classroom Building. In 1930 officially named "...In memory of Julian S. Carr, who gave the land on which these buildings stand. ERECTED BY JAMES B. DUKE." The university would later restore the name of the building from the Carr Building to the Classroom Building in 2018.
- Carr Hall, at the University of North Carolina at Chapel Hill. Carr paid the entire cost of this building, erected in 1900 as a dormitory. The building was renamed in 2020.
- In 1945, the 100th anniversary of his birth, Governor R. Gregg Cherry proclaimed October 12, 1945, as Julian S. Carr Day in North Carolina. On that day, an editorial in the Durham Sun said that "Named for him are a great many things, churches, a factory, a library, a Sunday School class, a host of children whose parents admired the man, and, now, Durham's Central Junior High School."

== See also ==
- Washington Duke
- Trinity College, now Duke University (North Carolina)
- Durham, North Carolina
- Edgemont (Durham, North Carolina)
- Golden Belt Historic District
- W. T. Blackwell and Co.
- Bull Durham Tobacco
- American University
- UNC
- Carrborro
- Somerset Villa
- Charlie Soong
- Occoneechee Speedway
