= John B. Halcott =

American architect

John Baldwin Halcott (April 5, 1846 – April 30, 1895) was an American architect who worked in New York State and North Carolina, known for his government buildings, ornate mansions, and hotels.

Local newspapers in North Carolina often credited him with the design of the New York State Capitol. Halcott had a much smaller uncredited role, but his association helped him find success in Wake County in North Carolina who commissioned him to remodel the courthouse.

Halcott designed grand hotels in Poughkeepsie and Shandaken that have not survived, except the Batcheller Mansion, a private home in Saratoga Springs has survived through restoration efforts.

== Early life ==
John Baldwin Halcott was born in Lexington, New York. His mother was Lucinda Cornish and his father George Washington Halcott held the position of sheriff in Greene County, New York. On 22 October 1868, he married Caroline Winnie.

John Halcott began his career in Albany, New York with an uncredited role in the construction of the New York State Capitol building.

In May 1873, Halcott partnered with architect Charles C. Nichols forming Nichols & Halcott, where he worked on:

=== Batcheller Mansion (1873) ===
In 1873, New York State assemblyman, George Sherman Batcheller, hired Nichols & Halcott to build a "Kaser-el-nouzha," Arabic for "palace of pleasure. The architects took inspiration from minarets in the tower.

The Batcheller mansion had elements of eclecticism with influences of the Renaissance Revival, Egyptian, and Italianate influences. Halcott would patent part of the design.

His daughter sold the Batcheller mansion in 1916, and it became the residence for a doctor, a boarding house, and then a retirement home, before being abandoned with a restoration campaign for the mansion in 70s and 80s.

Disney's Saratoga Springs Resort & Spa development manager Kevin Cummings cited the Batcheller Mansion as one of its inspirations.

=== Glen Fall's Methodist Church (1873) ===
The old Methodist Episcopal church of Glens Falls from 1829 burned and construction to rebuild it was commenced in 1865, and completed in 1873 for $25,000. Nichols & Halcott were the architects for the church reconstruction.

=== The Nelson House (1875) ===
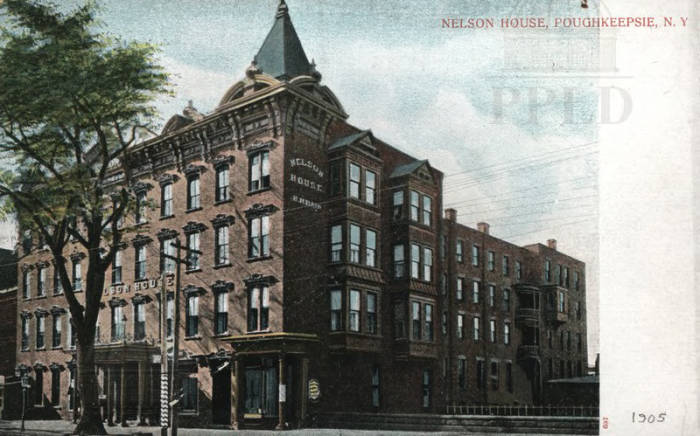
Postcard of Nelson House on Market Street in Poughkeepsie (1905)

Taylor purchased the site on Market Street, Poughkeepsie from her brother in 1861. In 1875, Catherine Taylor commissioned Nichols & Halcott to design a new grand hotel, four stories in height, which she named the Nelson house in honor of her brother, Homer A. Nelson. Halcott designed the facade made of brick, and it had elegant cornices and urn shaped columns with stables and a porch supported by six columns. Taylor hired J. W Shields as the painter, Jason. H. Seaman for carpentry, and W. Gregg for his masonry and plastering. The interior was quite ornate with a grand staircase and tessellated floors, alongside a barber shop and a fine dining restaurant. On May, 1876, the Nelson House opened.

During its tenure, it served as temporary White House when President Franklin D. Roosevelt his home in visited Hyde Park where he gave two campaign speeches from the balcony that stood above the marquee. The older portion of the building was cut in half in the mid twentieth century. The hotel operated until its closure in 1969.

The Dutchess County government purchased the hotel for $539,000 in 1969. It served as office space, and the exterior remained the same, but in 1996, the building was abandoned, and in 2012, it was demolished for 1.7 million dollars.

=== Argyle Presbyterian Church (1876) ===
Constructed in 1876, the Argyle Presbyterian church was located in Washington County and designed in a Gothic revival style with its steeple 130 feet high, seating 600 people. Halcott included sabbath school rooms in the design.

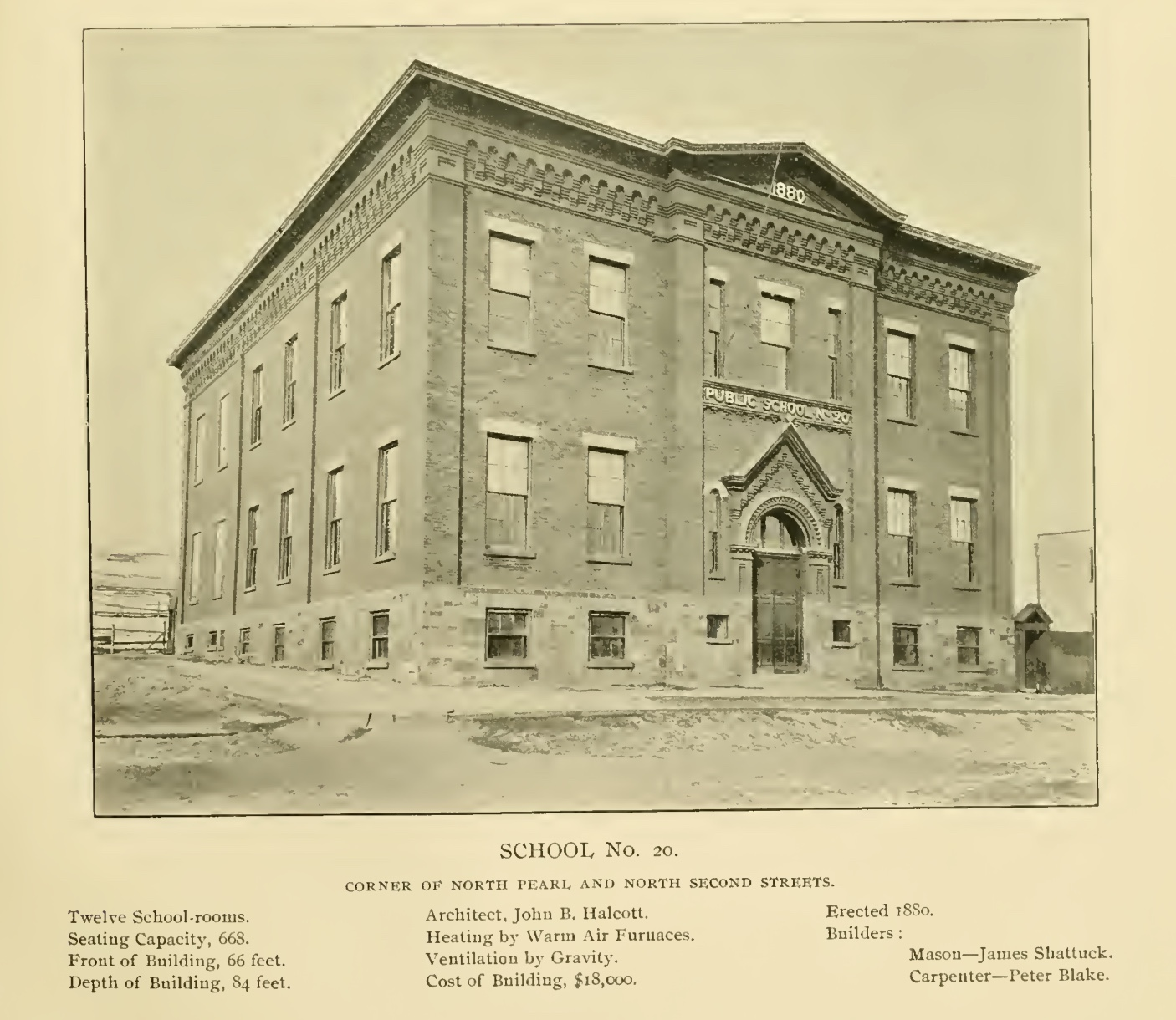
Albany Public School No 20.

The Albany Express said it was the "handsomest and most tasty of its kind in Northern New York." The church opened with a sermon from Rev. W.A Mackenzie.

=== Albany Public School No 20. (1880) ===
A twelve-room school house on the corner of North Pearl and North Second Street erected in 1880

== Success in North Carolina ==
Halcott was one of many northern architects who found work in the South since it was popular to hire northern architects in the late 19th century, especially for elaborate and ornate imposing designs, but his connection to his clients in the North Carolina has not been established.

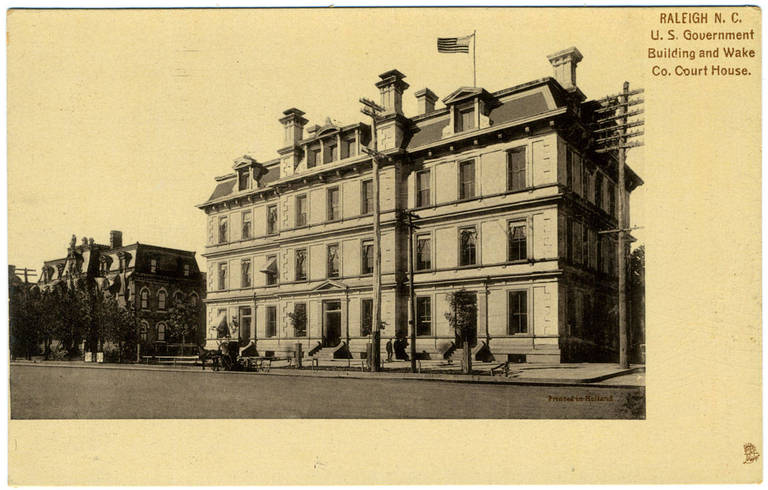
Wake County Courthouse, Raleigh

In Albany, the New York State Capital started construction in 1867 and it was designed in large teams of architects, Halcott might have capitalized upon his minor role for his North Carolina audience. Halcott was quite young, but he used his association with the government project to find success in North Carolina and it attracted the attention from Wake County commissioners in Raleigh, who selected him for remodeling their older antebellum courthouse.

Durham, North Carolina had suffered a plague of downtown fire, as well as expressed interest in more ornate, elaborate, and modern building from the growing population of wealthy industrialists.

Local Durham newspaper said about Halcott, he was “'one of the most competent architects in the United States, with long experience including four years’ employment on the beautiful capital of Albany."

=== Wakes County Courthouse (1881) ===
The courthouse which construction began in 1881, and completed in 1883. Halcott did a thorough remodeling of the older Greek Revival courthouse alongside builders Thomas H. Briggs and William J. Hicks. Halcott used an ornate red brick building that he often used in other works. The courthouse was an addition to the earlier Second Empire design United States Post Office and Courthouse by architect Alfred B. Mullett on Fayetteville St. in Raleigh. In 1915, the courthouse was demolished and Atlanta architect, Philip Thornton Marye designed a Beaux Arts style courthouse. In 1970, the court house was demolished once more, and now exists the current courthouse on the site.

During his career in North Carolina, he designed:

- Three commercial buildings for The Durham Tobacco Plant in Durham.
- Jones and Kramer Buildings on Main St. in Durham in 1887

=== The Somerset Villa (1876) ===
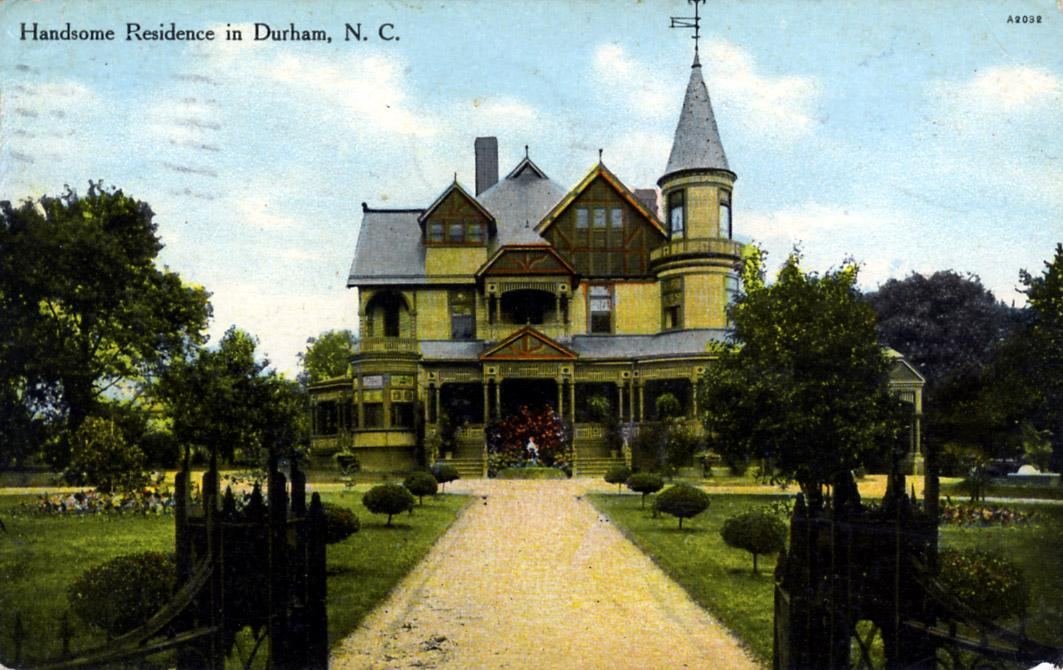
Somerset Villa in Durham, NC (ca. 1910)

The Somerset Villa was a Queen Anne style mansion for tobacco industrialist Julian S. Carr, one of the richest men in the state, to replace his previous Italianate house in Durham. The mansion on southeast corner of Main and Dillard street was termed "Halcott's most spectacular project in North Carolina" Halcott used local contractors, and the structure featured lavish murals and stained glass, but specialty items came from northern suppliers. The mansion reportedly cost $100,000. Somerset Villa was demolished in 1924.

A newspaper in Richmond described the Somerset Villa “the conspicuous landmark [of Durham] upon which the eye first falls and upon which it loves to linger.” As North Carolina observers commented "might have been one of many in other cities, but in Durham it was unique".

== Later career ==
Later in life, Halcott moved to Catskill, New York. During the 1880s, the census listed six children, George, Frank, John, Grace, Sarah, and Harris. He worked for the firm Mull & Fromer. Some of his work included:

- Catskill Mountain Rail Road station (1880)
- The Lament Hotel (1883)
- Third Reformed Church on South Ferry Street (1887).
- Greene County Office Building (1883) in Cairo, New York (formerly the Greene County Alms House)
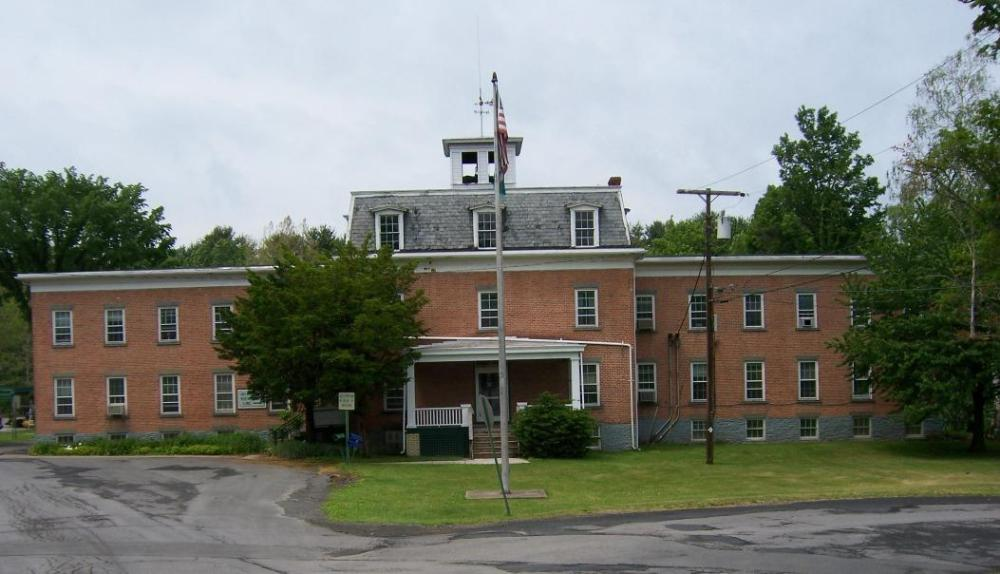
  Greene County Office Building, Cairo, New York, formerly the Greene County Alms House

=== Green County Alms House (1880) ===
Halcott designed and built in 1883, the Greene County Office Building in Cairo, New York, formerly the Greene County Alms House under Mull & Fromer.

=== The Lament Hotel (1883) ===
In 1883, Frank B. Lament Sr. from Lexington, New York commissioned architect John B. Halcott to design a new hotel in Shandaken. John B. Halcott originally from Lexington worked on the design of the hotel, which was three stories tall, located 1,100 feet elevation in the mountains situated next to the Esopus. The hotel had modern amenities, including electrical lights, steamed heating, and an elevator, one of the few summer resorts in the Catskill Mountains with an elevator, costing a total of 25,000 dollars in 1883.

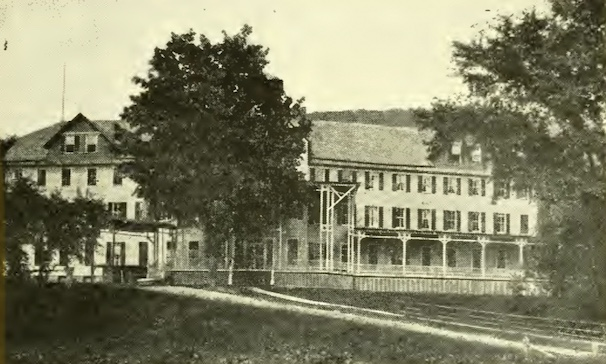
The old Palace hotel in 1897 published in Catskill Illustrated resort guide

The Lament hotel officially opened in 1884. In 1891, the hotel was sold to Frank Lament Jr. father-in-law and Shandaken native, Hiram Whitney, and the hotel underwent renovations, including constructing a swimming pool and tennis courts. It was renamed to the Palace Hotel, and it reopened, which resort guides and brochures labeled it a first-class experience.

R. Lionel De Lisser, known his photographic survey work in the Catskills, published Picturesque Ulster, said the Palace Hotel was “the most important summer hotel situated in the Village of Shandaken."

In 1906, the Whitney family sold the Palace Hotel and it reopened as the Glenbrook Hotel, which was a popular summer resort for Spanish, Puerto Rican, and Cuban population. Some famous guests, included bacteriologist Hideyo Noguchi, who was recuperating from typhoid.

In 1966, the Glenbrook Hotel burned down, which many Catskills summer resorts faced during their decline. Presently, the former site of the hotel is Glenbrook Park, a state-owned publicly accessible park with a baseball field, dog park, and an image of the original hotel sits on the welcome sign.

=== Independent ===
In 1892, Halcott was independent. In 1894, Halcott designed two mansions alongside Nolan, Nolan and Stern for Bernard L. and Josehp L. Steefel of Union Clothing Company in Albany on the corner of Madison and Lake Avenue.

==== Steefel House (1894) ====
The two story mansion's were built in a colonial style and had identical exteriors, and the interior contained gold pressed brick with hardwood floors mahogany and governor marble trimming. Each house had a spacious grounds and a stable in rear, and the two were connected by piazza.

Later it was purchased by Mrs. Elmer Blair for The Woman's Club of Albany in 1919, and a part of Washington Park Historic district and put on New York State Register of Historic Places and National Register of Historic Places.

== Legacy ==
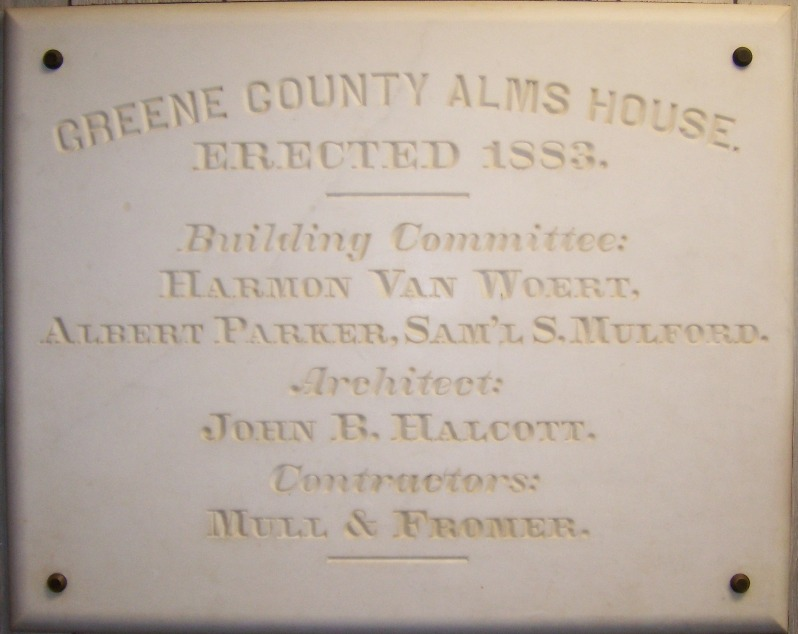
Building Plaque from the Greene County Office Building, Cairo, New York, formerly the Greene County Alms House.

On 30 April 1895, Halcott died a year after, age 49. His remains were buried in Albany Rural Cemetery. His son George W. Halcott became an architect in Worcester, Massachusetts.

Many buildings have not survived, but a few notable remain, including the Greene County Office Building, but one of the best preserved is the Batcheller Mansion, but most of his known work has been demolished.
