= Durham Cotton Mills Village Historic District =

Historic district in North Carolina, United States

- U.S. National Register of Historic Places
- U.S. Historic district
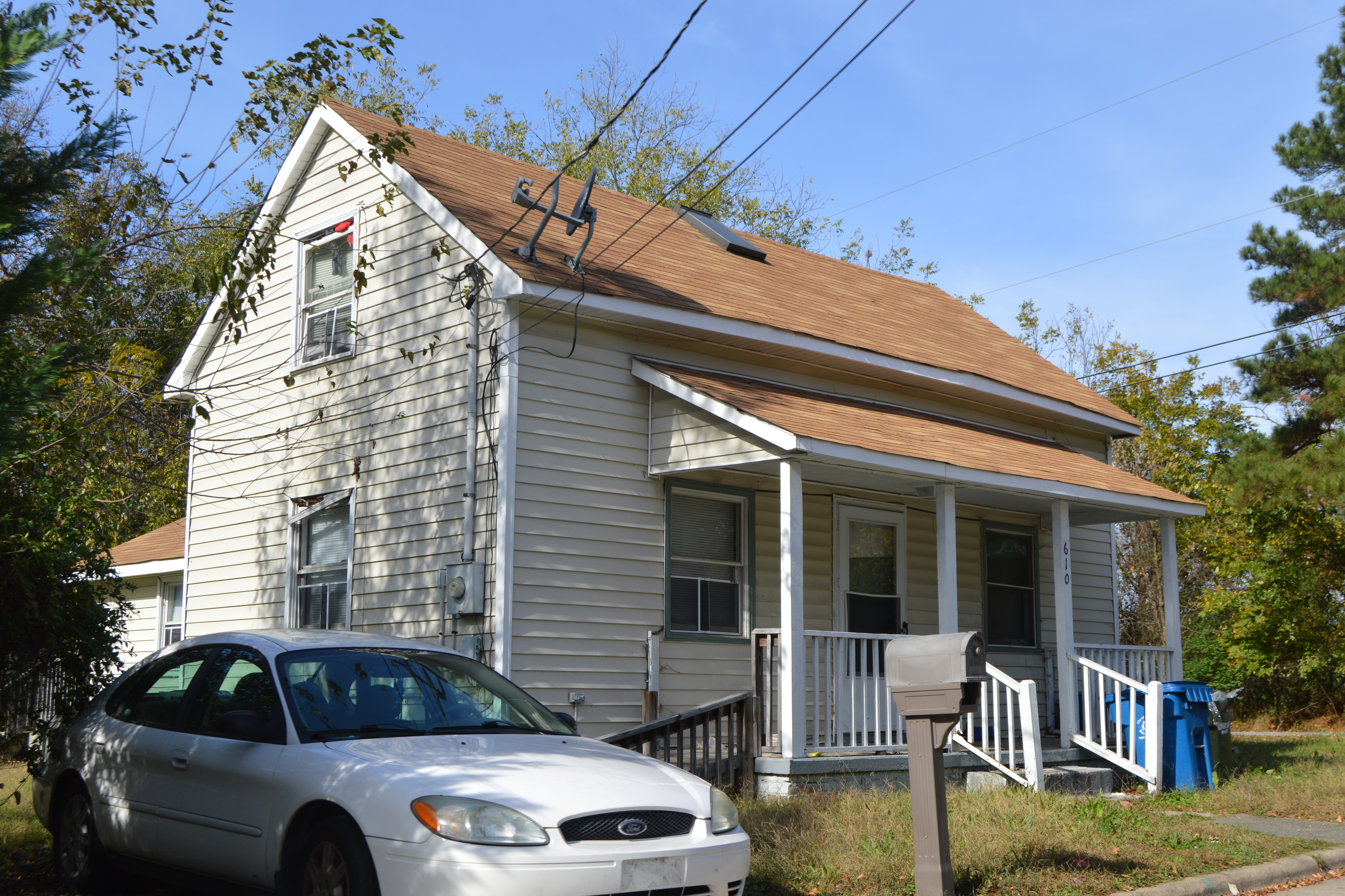
- House at 610 Reservoir Street

- Location within North Carolina Location within the United States
- Location: Roughly bounded by Byrd and Middle Sts., E. Frontage Rd. and Reservoir St., Durham, North Carolina
- Coordinates: 35°58′36″N 78°52′56″W
- Area: 5.9 acres (2.4 ha)
- Architectural style: Story and a jump
- MPS: Durham MRA
- NRHP reference No.: 85001793
- Added to NRHP: August 9, 1985

Durham Cotton Mills Village Historic District are a set of historic mill village houses and national historic district located at Durham, Durham County, North Carolina. The district encompasses 15 contributing residential buildings built by the Durham Cotton Manufacturing Company. They are 1 1/2-story, "story and a jump" gable end frame dwellings dated to the mid-1880s. Twelve of the dwellings have rear one-story, gable-roofed ells.

It was listed on the National Register of Historic Places in 1985.
