= W. T. Blackwell and Company =

- Bull Durham Tobacco Factory
- U.S. National Register of Historic Places
- U.S. National Historic Landmark
- U.S. Historic district – Contributing property
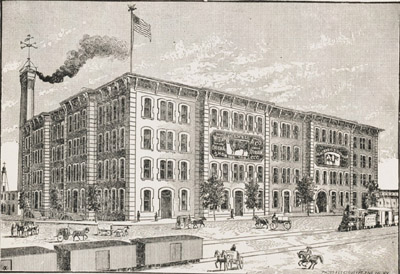
- W.T. Blackwell & Co. Tobacco Factory, circa 1895

- Location within North Carolina Location within the United States
- Location: 201 W. Pettigrew St., Durham, North Carolina
- Coordinates: 35°59′38″N 78°54′16″W
- Area: less than one acre
- Built: 1874
- Architectural style: Italianate
- Part of: American Tobacco Company Manufacturing Plant (ID00001163)
- NRHP reference No.: 74001346

Significant dates
- Added to NRHP: September 10, 1974
- Designated NHL: December 22, 1977
- Designated CP: September 29, 2000

W.T. Blackwell & Co. Tobacco was a tobacco manufacturer in Durham, North Carolina. It was best known as the original producer of Bull Durham Tobacco, the first nationally marketed brand of tobacco products in the United States. The Blackwell tobacco factory in Durham, built in 1874, was declared a National Historic Landmark in 1977. It is included in the American Tobacco Company Manufacturing Plant historic district, and is now occupied by apartments.

== History ==
During the occupation of Durham by various military forces in the American Civil War, the quality of some of its tobacco was recognized. Former soldiers sought to acquire the tobacco produced by John Ruffin Green, who created the Bull Durham logo. Green in 1868 partnered with William T. Blackwell, who after Green's death formed a partnership with Julian S. Carr to continue producing and marketing the brand. The company experienced rapid growth, due in part to one of the nation's first nationwide advertising campaigns, which made the Bull Durham logo widely recognizable. The Bull Durham brand continued, through ownership changes, until 1988.

== Factory ==
The Blackwell factory, located at the corner of West Pettigrew and Blackwell Streets in Durham, was built in stages between 1874 and 1903. It is a four-story brick building, with commercial Italianate style. It has a central courtyard, and was, at 94,000 square feet (8,700 m^{2}), once billed as the world's largest tobacco factory. The Bull Durham brand was manufactured at this facility until 1957, when its manufacture was transferred to a factory in Richmond, Virginia.

== Gallery ==
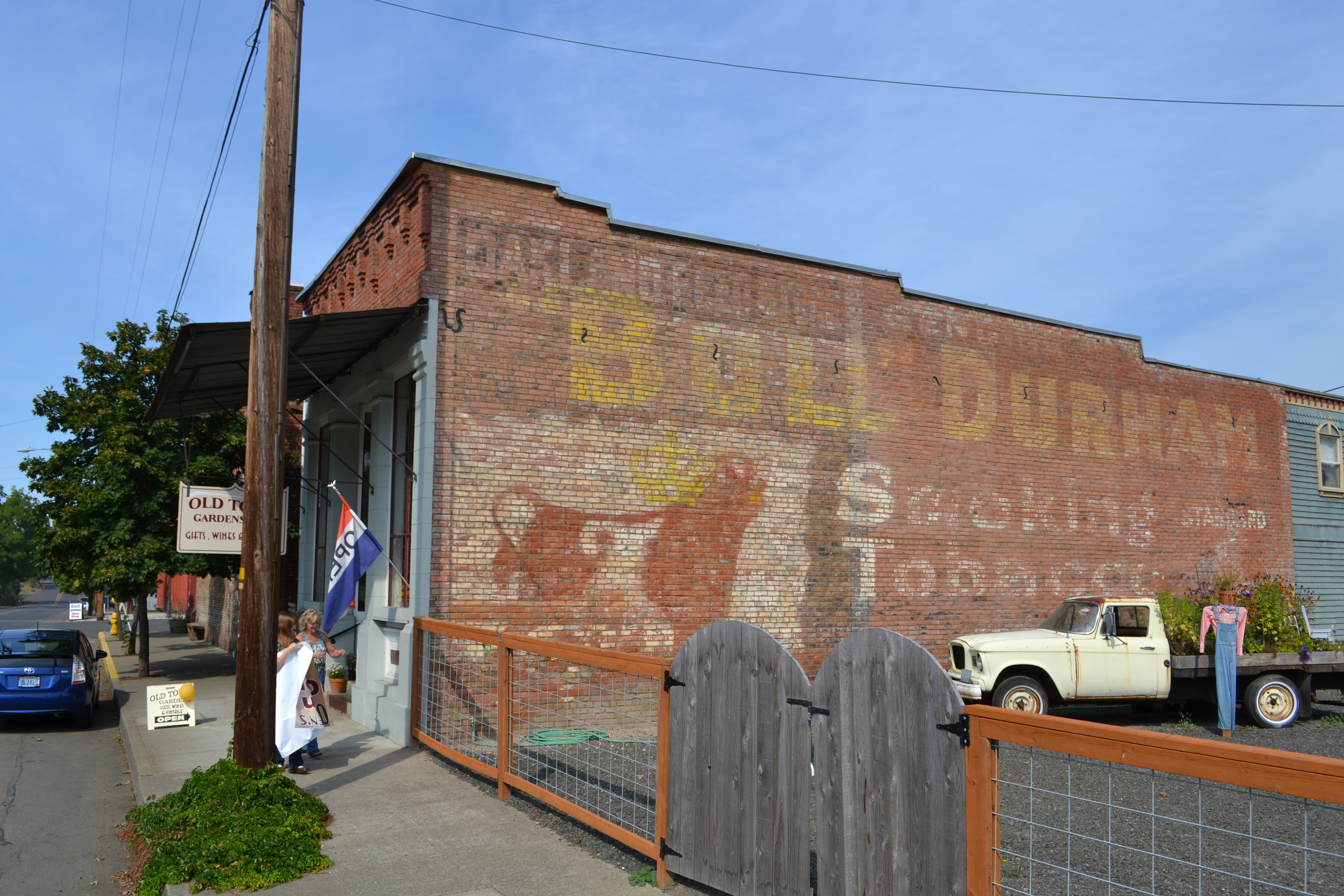
Bull Durham signage in Oakland, Oregon

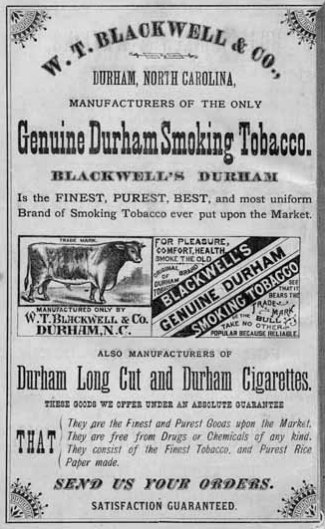
1881 W. T. Blackwell advertisement

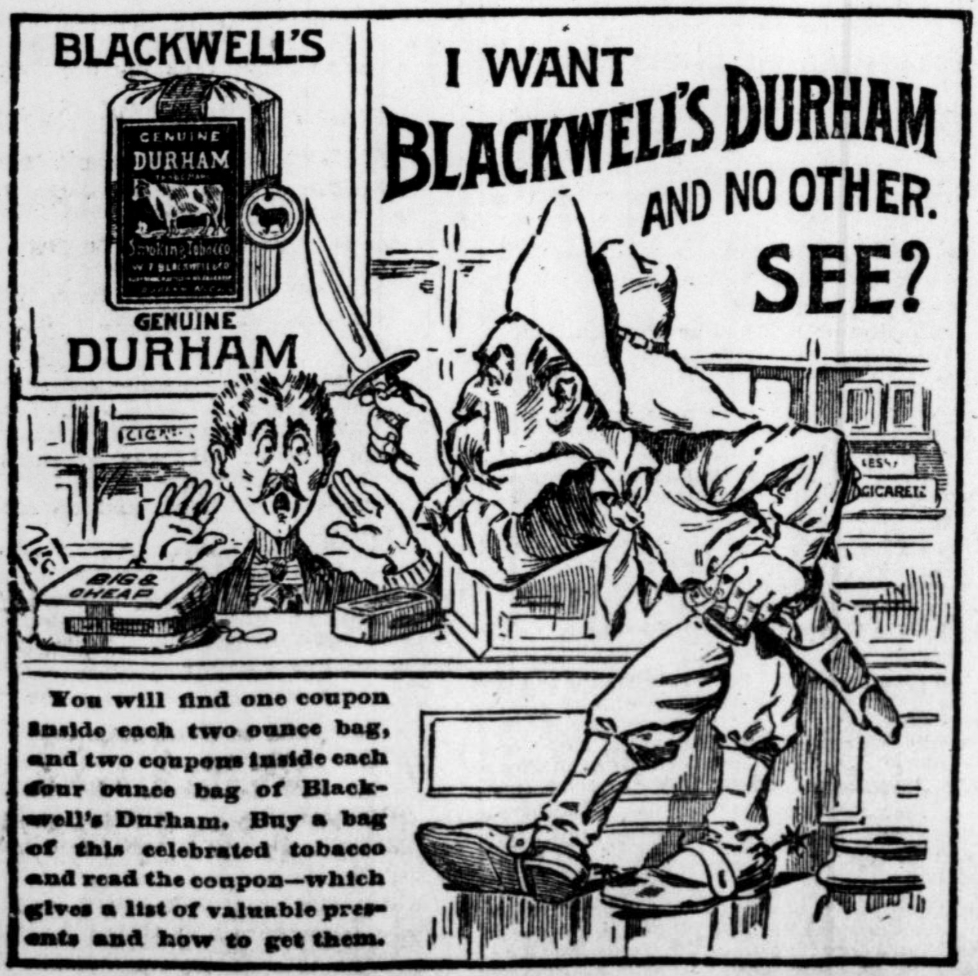
1896 advertisement

== See also ==
- List of National Historic Landmarks in North Carolina
- National Register of Historic Places listings in Durham County, North Carolina
