= List of girls' schools in the United States =

This is a list of schools which only admit girls, or which only admit girls in certain grade levels, in the United States.

== Arizona ==
- Girls Leadership Academy of Arizona, Phoenix (9–12)
- Mingus Mountain Academy, Prescott Valley (6–12)
- Xavier College Preparatory, Phoenix (9–12)

Former

- Jokake School for Girls, Scottsdale (1933–1945)
- Spring Ridge Academy, Mayer (1996–2023)

== Arkansas ==
- Mount St. Mary Academy, Little Rock (9–12)

Former

- Fayetteville Female Seminary, Fayetteville (1839–1862)

== California ==
- St. Francis High School, Sacramento (9–12)

Los Angeles area

- Alverno Heights Academy, Sierra Madre (PK–8)
- The Archer School for Girls, Los Angeles (6–12)
- Bishop Conaty-Our Lady of Loretto High School, Los Angeles (9–12)
- Flintridge Sacred Heart Academy, La Cañada Flintridge (9–12)
- Girls Academic Leadership Academy, Los Angeles (6–12)
- Immaculate Heart High School, Los Angeles (6–12)
- Louisville High School, Los Angeles (9–12)
- Marlborough School, Los Angeles (7–12)
- Marymount High School, Los Angeles (9–12)
- Mayfield Senior School, Pasadena (9–12)
- New Village Girls Academy, Los Angeles (9–12)
- Notre Dame Academy, Los Angeles (9–12)
- Pomona Catholic High School, Pomona (co-ed 6–8, all-girls 9–12)
- Ramona Convent Secondary School, Alhambra (9–12)
- Rosary High School, Fullerton (9–12)
- Sacred Heart High School, Los Angeles (9–12)
- St. Joseph High School, Lakewood (9–12)
- St. Lucy's Priory High School, Glendora (9–12)
- St. Mary's Academy, Inglewood (9–12)
- San Gabriel Mission High School, San Gabriel (9–12)
- Westridge School, Pasadena (4–12)
- YULA Girls High School (Los Angeles)

San Francisco Bay Area

- Carondelet High School, Concord (9–12)
- Castilleja School, Palo Alto (6–12)
- Convent of the Sacred Heart High School, San Francisco (K–12)
- The Hamlin School, San Francisco (K–8)
- Holy Names High School, Oakland (9–12)
- ICA Cristo Rey Academy, San Francisco (9–12)
- Julia Morgan School for Girls, Oakland (6–8)
- Katherine Delmar Burke School, San Francisco (K–8)
- Mercy High School, Burlingame (9–12)
- Notre Dame High School, Belmont (9–12)
- Notre Dame High School, San Jose (9–12)
- Presentation High School, San Jose (9–12)
- The Girls' Middle School, Palo Alto (6–8)

San Diego area

- The Academy of Our Lady of Peace, San Diego (9–12)
- Torah High Schools of San Diego, San Diego (9–12)

Monterey area

- Santa Catalina School, Monterey (co-ed PK–8, all-girls 9–12)
- Notre Dame High School, Salinas (9–12)

Former

- Cornelia Connelly High School, Anaheim (1961–2020)
- Corvallis High School, Los Angeles (1941–1987)
- Girls High School, San Francisco (1865–1952)
- Holy Family High School, Glendale (1937–2023)
- La Reina High School, Thousand Oaks (1964–2024)
- Loretto High School, Sacramento (1955–2009)
- Mercy High School, San Francisco (1952–2020)
- Miss Orton's Classical School for Girls, Pasadena (1890–1930)
- Queen of Angels Academy (Compton, California), Compton (1995–2002)
- Ursuline High School, Santa Rosa (1880–2011)
- Villa Cabrini Academy, Burbank (1937–1970)

== Colorado ==
- Beth Jacob High School of Denver, Denver (9–12)
- St. Mary's Academy, Cherry Hills Village (co-ed PK–8, all-girls 9–12)
- The Girls Athletic Leadership Schools - GALS Denver, Denver (6–8)

== Connecticut ==
- Academy of Our Lady of Mercy, Lauralton Hall, Milford (9–12)
- Academy of the Holy Family, Baltic (9–12)
- The Ethel Walker School, Simsbury (7–12)
- Greenwich Academy, Greenwich (PK–12)
- Mercy High School, Middletown (9–12)
- Miss Porter's School, Farmington (9–12)
- Sacred Heart Academy, Hamden (9–12)
- Sacred Heart Greenwich, Greenwich (co-ed PK, all-girls K–12)
- Westover School, Middlebury (9–12)

Former

- Canterbury Female Boarding School, Canterbury (1831–1834)
- Rosemary Hall, Greenwich merged with the Choate School to become Choate Rosemary Hall in 1978

== Delaware ==
- Padua Academy, Wilmington (9–12)
- Ursuline Academy (co-ed PK–5, all-girls 6–12), Wilmington

Former

- Tatnall School, Wilmington (became co-ed in 1952)

== District of Columbia (Washington, DC) ==
- Georgetown Visitation Preparatory School (9–12)
- National Cathedral School (4–12)

== Florida ==
- Meoros Girls High School, Orlando
- Pace Center for Girls, Jacksonville (6–12)

Miami area

- Beis Chana High School for Girls (9–12)/Beit Apel-Campus Chaya Mushka (2–8), Miami
- Beth Jacob High School (Bais Yaakov Miami), North Miami Beach (6–12)
- Carrollton School of the Sacred Heart, Miami (PK–12)
- Our Lady of Lourdes Academy, Ponce-Davis (9–12)
- Rohr Bais Chaya Academy, Tamarac (9–12)
- Sha'arei Bina Torah Academy for Girls, Hollywood (6–12)
- Young Women's Preparatory Academy, Miami (6–12)

Tampa area

- Academy of the Holy Names, Tampa (co-ed PK–8, all-girls 9–12)
- Ferrell Girls Preparatory Academy Middle Magnet School, Tampa (6–8)

Former

- Academy of the Assumption, Miami (1943–1976)

== Georgia ==
- Coretta Scott King Young Women's Leadership Academy, Atlanta (6–12)
- St. Vincent's Academy, Savannah (9–12)

Former

- College Temple, Newnan (1854–1888)
- Girls High School, Atlanta became the co-ed Roosevelt High School in 1947 and closed in 1985
- Lucy Cobb Institute, Athens (1859–1931)
- Mount de Sales Academy, Macon (became co-ed in 1959)

== Hawaii ==
- La Pietra, Honolulu (6–12)
- Sacred Hearts Academy, Honolulu (PK–12)
- St. Andrew's Priory, Honolulu (K–12)
- Huakailani School for Girls, Kaneohe CDP (PK–8)

Former

- Saint Francis School, Honolulu (became co-ed in 2012, closed in 2019)

== Illinois ==
Chicago area

- Aqsa School, Bridgeview (PK–12)
- De La Salle Institute (girls' campus) (Chicago)
- Hanna Sacks Bais Yaakov High School, Chicago (9–12)
- Josephinum Academy, Chicago (9–12)
- Lubavitch Girls High School, Chicago (9–12)
- Mother McAuley Liberal Arts High School, Chicago (9–12)
- Our Lady of Tepeyac High School, Chicago (9–12)
- Regina Dominican High School, Wilmette (9–12)
- Resurrection High School, Chicago (9–12)
- Rosary College Prep, Aurora (9–12)
- Trinity High School, River Forest (9–12)
- Willows Academy, Des Plaines (6–12)
- Woodlands Academy of the Sacred Heart, Lake Forest (9–12)

Closed

- Academy of Notre Dame/Cathedral High School/Notre Dame Academy, Belleville (closed 2024)
- Marywood Academy, Evanston
- Girton School for Girls, Winnetka (1900–1918)
- Maria High School, Chicago (1911–2013)
- Mount Assisi Academy, Lemont (1951–2014)
- Notre Dame High School for Girls, Chicago (1938–2016)
- Queen of Peace High School, Burbank (1962–2017)
- St. Mary's School, Knoxville, Illinois
- St. Scholastica Academy, Chicago (1865–2012)
- Young Women's Leadership Charter School of Chicago, Chicago (1999–2019)

Merged

- Madonna Catholic High School, Aurora merged with Roncalli High School to become Aurora Central Catholic High School in 1968
- Sacred Heart Academy, Lisle merged with St. Procopius Academy to become Benet Academy in 1967
- St. Francis Academy, Joliet merged with Joliet Catholic High School to become Joliet Catholic Academy in 1990
- Saint Louise de Marillac High School, Northfield merged into Loyola Academy in 1994

Became coeducational

- Roycemore School, Evanston

== Iowa ==
Closed

- Immaculate Conception Academy, Davenport merged with St. Ambrose Academy to become Assumption High School in 1968
- Lyons Female College, Clinton (1858–1872)
- Our Lady of Angels Seminary, Clinton (1872–1966)

== Kentucky ==
- Notre Dame Academy, Park Hills (9–12)

Louisville

- Assumption High School (9–12)
- Mercy Academy (9–12)
- Presentation Academy (9–12)
- Sacred Heart Academy (9–12)

Former

- Angela Merici High School, Louisville merged with Bishop David High School to become Holy Cross High School in 1984
- Loretto High School, Louisville merged into Flaget High School in 1973, which would close a year later
- Our Lady of Providence Academy/Academy of Notre Dame de Providence, Newport merged with Newport Catholic High School to become Newport Central Catholic High School in 1983

== Louisiana ==
- Academy of the Sacred Heart, Grand Coteau (PK–12)
- St. Joseph's Academy, Baton Rouge (9–12)
- St. Scholastica Academy, Covington (8–12)

New Orleans area

- Academy of Our Lady, Marrero (8–12)
- Academy of the Sacred Heart, New Orleans (PK–12)
- Archbishop Chapelle High School, Metairie (8–12)
- Cabrini High School, New Orleans (8–12)
- Christian Brothers School, New Orleans (co-ed PK–4, gender separate 5–7)
- McGehee School, New Orleans (PK–12)
- Mount Carmel Academy, New Orleans (8–12)
- St. Katharine Drexel Preparatory School, New Orleans (8–12)
- St. Mary's Academy, New Orleans (co-ed PK–7, all-girls 8–12)
- St. Mary's Dominican High School, New Orleans (8–12)
- Ursuline Academy, New Orleans (PK–12)

Former

- Archbishop Blenk High School, Gretna (1962–2007)
- Eleanor McMain Secondary School (New Orleans)
- Grace King High School, Metairie became co-ed in the 1980s and closed in 2023
- Riverdale High School, Jefferson became co-ed in 1980
- St. Joseph Academy, New Orleans

== Maine ==
Former

- Catherine McAuley High School, Portland (1969–2016)
- The Maine Girls' Academy, Portland (2016–2018)

Became coeducational

- Waynflete School, Portland was all-girls over fourth grade from 1898 to 1950. Boys were admitted past the fourth grade starting in 1950 and were admitted into the upper school in 1967.

== Maryland ==
Baltimore area

- Baltimore Leadership School for Young Women, Baltimore (6–12)
- Western High School (Baltimore)
- Bryn Mawr School, Baltimore (PK–12)
- The Catholic High School of Baltimore, Baltimore (9–12)
- Garrison Forest School, Owings Mills (co-ed PK, all-girls K–12)
- Maryvale Preparatory School, Lutherville (6–12)
- Mercy High School, Baltimore (9–12)
- Mount de Sales Academy, Catonsville (9–12)
- Notre Dame Preparatory School (Towson)
- Oldfields School, Sparks Glencoe (8–12)
- Roland Park Country School, Baltimore (PK–12)
- St. Paul's School for Girls, Brooklandville (5–12)
- St. Timothy's School, Stevenson (9–12)
- Western High School, Baltimore (9–12)

Washington, DC area

- Academy of the Holy Cross, Kensington (9–12)
- Brookewood School, Kensington (K–12)
- Connelly School of the Holy Child, Potomac (6–12)
- Elizabeth Seton High School, Bladensburg (9–12)
- Holton-Arms School, Bethesda (3–12)
- Stone Ridge School of the Sacred Heart, Bethesda (PK–12)

Former

- Eastern Female High School, Baltimore (1844–1986)
- Immaculata Preparatory School, Rockville (1905–1991)
- Institute of Notre Dame, Baltimore (1847–2020)
- La Reine High School, Suitland (1960–1992)
- Samuel Ready School, Baltimore (1887–1977)
- Seton Keough High School, Baltimore (1965–2017)

== Massachusetts ==
- Dana Hall School, Wellesley (5–12)
- Fontbonne Academy, Milton (7–12)
- Miss Hall's School, Pittsfield (9–12)
- Nashoba Brooks School, Concord (co-ed PK–3, all-girls 4–8) (Concord)
- Newton Country Day School, Newton (5–12)
- Notre Dame Academy, Hingham (7–12)
- Notre Dame Academy, Worcester (7–12)
- Stoneleigh-Burnham School, Greenfield (7–12)
- Ursuline Academy, Dedham (7–12)
- Winsor School, Boston (5–12)
- Woodward School for Girls, Quincy (6–12)

Merged

- Abbot Academy, Andover merged into Phillips Academy in 1973

Became coeducational

- Boston Latin Academy, Boston became co-ed in 1972

Closed

- Academy at Penguin Hall, Wenham (2015–2025)
- Charlestown Female Seminary, Charlestown (1830–1834)
- Dr. Dio Lewis's School for Young Ladies, Lexington (1864–1867)
- Elizabeth Seton Academy, Boston (2003–2016)
- Foxhollow School, Lenox (1930–1976)
- Girls' High School, Boston became the co-ed Roxbury High School in the 1960s and closed in 1981.
- Mount Alvernia High School, Newton (1935–2023)
- Nazareth Academy, Wakefield (2009–2016)

== Michigan ==
- Academy of the Sacred Heart, Bloomfield Township (co-ed PK–8, all-girls 9–12)
- Detroit International Academy for Young Women, Detroit (PK–12)
- Marian High School, Bloomfield Hills (9–12)
- Mercy High School, Farmington Hills (9–12)
- Regina High School, Warren (9–12)
- St. Catherine of Siena Academy, Wixom (9–12)

Former

- Girls Catholic Central High School, Detroit (1893–1969)
- Ladywood High School, Livonia (1950–2018)
- Our Lady of Guadalupe Girls' Middle School, Detroit
- Our Lady Star of the Sea High School, Grosse Pointe Woods (1959–1993)

== Minnesota ==
- Visitation School, Mendota Heights (PK–12)

== Mississippi ==
- Our Lady Academy, Bay St. Louis (7–12)

== Missouri ==
- Cor Jesu Academy, Affton (9–12)
- Incarnate Word Academy, Bel-Nor (9–12)
- Nerinx Hall High School, Webster Groves (9–12)
- Notre Dame de Sion School, Kansas City (co-ed PK–8, all-girls 9–12)
- Notre Dame High School, Lemay (9–12)
- Rosati-Kain Academy, St. Louis (9–12)
- St. Joseph's Academy, Frontenac (9–12)
- St. Teresa's Academy, Kansas City (9–12)
- Ursuline Academy, Oakland (9–12)
- Villa Duchesne, Frontenac (co-ed PK–6, all-girls 7–12)
- Visitation Academy of St. Louis, Town and Country (PK–12)

Closed

- Circle of Hope Girls Ranch, Humansville (2006–2020)
- Hawthorn Leadership School for Girls, St. Louis (2015–2023)
- Laboure High School, St. Louis (1946–1979). It was replaced by Cardinal Ritter College Prep High School.
- Lenox Hall, St. Louis
- St. Alphonsus Rock High School, St. Louis (closed 1973)
- St. Elizabeth Academy, St. Louis (1882–2013)
- Xavier High School. Building sold to St. Louis University

== Nebraska ==
Omaha

- Duchesne Academy of the Sacred Heart (9–12)
- Marian High School (9–12)
- Mercy High School (9–12)

== New Jersey ==
- Academy of Saint Elizabeth, Convent Station (9–12)
- Academy of the Holy Angels, Demarest (6–12)
- Bruriah High School for Girls, Elizabeth (7–12)
- Girls' Academy of Newark, Newark (6–12)
- Immaculate Heart Academy, Washington Township (9–12)
- Kenmare High School, Jersey City (alternative)
- Kent Place School, Summit (co-ed PK, all-girls K–12)
- Lacordaire Academy, Montclair (co-ed PK–8, all-girls 9–12)
- Ma'ayanot Yeshiva High School, Teaneck (9–12)
- Mary Help of Christians Academy, North Haledon (9–12)
- Mother Seton Regional High School, Clark (9–12)
- Mount Saint Dominic Academy, Caldwell (9–12)
- Mount St. Mary Academy, Watchung (9–12)
- Oak Knoll School of the Holy Child, Summit (PK–12)
- Our Lady of Mercy Academy, Franklin Township (9–12)
- Saint Dominic Academy, Jersey City (7–12)
- Saint Vincent Academy, Newark (9–12)
- Stuart Country Day School, Princeton (PK–12)
- Trinity Hall, Tinton Falls (9–12)
- Villa Victoria Academy, Ewing Township (6–12)
- Villa Walsh Academy, Morristown (7–12)

Closed

- Academy of the Sacred Heart, Hoboken and Academy of St. Aloysius, Jersey City merged in 2006 to become Caritas Academy, which then closed in 2008.
- Benedictine Academy, Elizabeth (1915–2020)
- Holy Family Academy, Bayonne (1925–2013)
- Immaculate Conception High School, Lodi (1915–2023)
- Marylawn of the Oranges Academy, South Orange (1935–2013)
- Purnell School, Pottersville (1963–2021)

Merged

- Battin High School, Elizabeth merged into Elizabeth High School in 1977

== New York ==
New York City

Manhattan

- Brearley School (K–12)
- Cathedral High School (9–12)
- Chapin School (K–12)
- Convent of the Sacred Heart (PK–12)
- Dominican Academy (9–12)
- Hewitt School (K–12)
- Manhattan High School for Girls
- Marymount School of New York (PK–12)
- Nightingale-Bamford School (K–12)
- Notre Dame School (9–12)
- Girls Prep Lower East Side (K–4 Elementary, 5-8 Middle)
- St. Jean Baptiste High School (9–12)
- St. Vincent Ferrer High School (9–12)
- Spence School (K–12)
- Urban Assembly School of Business for Young Women (9–12)
- Young Women's Leadership School of East Harlem (6–12)

Bronx

- Academy of Mount St. Ursula (9–12)
- Preston High School (9–12)
- Girls Prep Bronx (K–4 Elementary, 5–8 Middle)
- St. Catharine Academy (9–12)
- St. Raymond Academy (9–12)

Brooklyn

- Beth Rivkah (K–12)
- Bnos Leah Prospect Park Yeshiva School (K–12)
- Fontbonne Hall Academy (6–12)
- Shulamith School for Girls of Brooklyn (PK–12)
- Saint Saviour High School of Brooklyn (9–12)
- Urban Assembly Institute of Math and Science for Young Women (6–12)
- Yeshivat Shaare Torah Girls High School (9–12)
- Young Women's Leadership School, Brooklyn (6–12)

Queens

- The Mary Louis Academy (9–12)
- Samuel H. Wang Yeshiva University High School for Girls (9–12)
- The Young Women's Leadership School of Astoria (6–12)
- The Young Women's Leadership School of Queens (6–12)

Staten Island

- Notre Dame Academy (PK–12)
- St. Joseph Hill Academy (co-ed PK–8, all-girls 9–12)

Former

- Aquinas High School, Bronx (1923–2021)
- Bishop Kearney High School, Brooklyn
- Brooklyn Heights Seminary, Brooklyn (1851–1933)
- Catherine McAuley High School, Brooklyn (1942–2013)
- Columbia Religious and Industrial School for Jewish Girls, Manhattan (1888–1944)
- Dominican Commercial High School, Queens (1936–1998)
- Gardner School for Girls, Manhattan
- Hebrew Technical School for Girls, Manhattan (1880–1932)
- Manhattan Trade School for Girls, Manhattan
- Moore Catholic High School, Staten Island (became co-ed in 1969)
- Mother Cabrini High School, Manhattan (1899–2014)
- The Girls' Commercial High School (became coeducational as Prospect Heights High School and then closed)
- Loisian Seminary, Brooklyn
- St. Agnes Academic High School, Queens (1908–2021)
- St. Barnabas High School, Bronx (1924–2024)
- St. John Villa Academy, Staten Island (1922–2018)
- St. Joseph by the Sea High School, Staten Island (became co-ed in 1973)
- St. Joseph High School, Brooklyn (1904–2020)
- St. Michael Academy, Manhattan (1874–2010)
- St. Peter's Girls High School, Staten Island (1926–2011)
- St. Pius V High School, Bronx (1930–2011)
- Stella Maris High School, Queens (1943–2010)
- Van Norman Institute, Manhattan (1857–1906)
- Veltin School for Girls, Manhattan (1886–1924)
- Wadleigh High School for Girls, Manhattan

New York State

Buffalo area

- Buffalo Academy of the Sacred Heart, Eggertsville (9–12)
- Buffalo Seminary (SEM), Buffalo (9–12)
- Mount Mercy Academy, Buffalo (9–12)
- Mount Saint Mary Academy, Kenmore (9–12)
- Nardin Academy, Buffalo (co-ed PK–8, all-girls 9–12)

Capital District

- Academy of the Holy Names, Albany (6–12)
- Albany Academy for Girls, Albany (PK–12)
- Emma Willard School, Troy (9–12)

Hudson Valley

- Maria Regina High School, Hartsdale
- School of the Holy Child, Harrison (5–12)
- The Ursuline School, New Rochelle

Long Island

- Harmony Heights School, East Norwich (8–12)
- Our Lady of Mercy Academy, Syosset (9–12)
- Sacred Heart Academy, Hempstead (9–12)
- Shulamith School for Girls in Long Island, Cedarhurst (PK–12)
- Stella K. Abraham High School for Girls, Hewlett Bay Park (9–12)

Former

- Academy of Our Lady of Good Counsel, White Plains (1922–2015)
- Academy of Saint Joseph, Brentwood (1856–2009)
- Brookholt School of Agriculture for Women, East Meadow (1911–1912)
- Falley Seminary, Fulton (1836–1883)
- Holy Angels Academy, Buffalo (1861–2013)
- Immaculata Academy, Hamburg (1928–2016)
- Our Lady of Victory Academy, Dobbs Ferry (1961–2011)
- Putnam Hall School, Poughkeepsie

== North Carolina ==
- Girls Leadership Academy of Wilmington, Wilmington (6–12)
- Saint Mary's School, Raleigh (9–12)
- Salem Academy, Winston-Salem (9–12)

== Ohio ==
- Columbus School for Girls, Bexley (PK–12)

Cincinnati area

- Mercy McAuley High School, Cincinnati (9–12)
- Mount Notre Dame High School, Reading
- St. Ursula Academy, Cincinnati (9–12)
- Seton High School, Cincinnati (9–12)
- Ursuline Academy, Blue Ash (9–12)

Cleveland area

- Beaumont School, Cleveland Heights (9–12)
- Hathaway Brown School, Shaker Heights (PK–12)
- Laurel School, Shaker Heights (PK–12)
- Magnificat High School, Rocky River (9–12)
- Our Lady of the Elms High School, Akron (PK–12)
- Saint Joseph Academy, Cleveland (9–12)

Toledo

- Notre Dame Academy (6–12)
- St. Ursula Academy (6–12)

Merged

- Mother of Mercy High School, Cincinnati merged with McAuley High School (Cincinnati) to become Mercy McAuley High School in 2018
- Notre Dame Academy, Chardon merged with Cathedral Latin School to become Notre Dame-Cathedral Latin School in 1988
- St. Joseph Academy, Cincinnati became co-ed and was renamed to Archbishop McNicholas High School in 1950
- Ursuline Academy of the Holy Name of Jesus, Youngstown became co-ed in 1930
- Villa Angela Academy, Cleveland merged with St. Joseph High School to become Villa Angela-St. Joseph High School in 1990

Closed

- Hoban Dominican High School, Cleveland (1951–1971)
- McAuley High School, Toledo (1958–1988)
- Miss Mittleberger's School for Girls, Cleveland (1877–1908)
- Regina High School, South Euclid (closed 2010)
- Sacred Heart Academy, Cincinnati (1876–1970)
- St. Augustine Academy, Lakewood (1921–2005)
- Xenia Female Academy/Xenia Female Seminary/Xenia College, Xenia became co-ed in 1863, closed in 1895

== Oregon ==
- St. Mary's Academy, Portland (9–12)

== Pennsylvania ==
- The Grier School, Tyrone (5–12)
- Linden Hall, Lititz (6–12)

Philadelphia area

- Academy of Notre Dame de Namur, Radnor (6–12)
- Agnes Irwin School, Rosemont (PK–12)
- The Baldwin School, Bryn Mawr (PK–12)
- Gwynedd Mercy Academy High School, Lower Gwynedd (9–12)
- Little Flower Catholic High School for Girls, Philadelphia (9–12)
- Merion Mercy Academy, Merion (9–12)
- Mount Saint Joseph Academy, Flourtown (9–12)
- Nazareth Academy High School, Philadelphia (9–12)
- Philadelphia High School for Girls, Philadelphia (9–12)
- Sacred Heart Academy Bryn Mawr, Bryn Mawr (K–12)
- St. Hubert Catholic High School for Girls, Philadelphia (9–12)
- Villa Joseph Marie High School, Holland (9–12)
- Villa Maria Academy, Malvern (9–12)

Pittsburgh area

- The Ellis School, Pittsburgh (PK–12)
- Oakland Catholic High School, Pittsburgh (9–12)

Closed

- Holy Child Academy, Sharon Hill (1864–1973)
- J. W. Hallahan Catholic Girls High School, Philadelphia (1901–2021)
- Madame Grelaud's French School, Philadelphia (1809–1849)
- Mount Alvernia High School, Pittsburgh (1936–2011)
- The Young Women's Leadership School at Rhodes High School, Philadelphia (2005–2012)
- Saint Basil Academy, Jenkintown (1931–2021)

Merged

- Archbishop Prendergast High School, Drexel Hill merged with Monsignor Bonner High School to become Bonner & Prendergast High School in 2006
- Saint Maria Goretti High School, Philadelphia merged with Saint John Neumann High School to become Saints John Neumann and Maria Goretti Catholic High School in 1992
- West Philadelphia Catholic High School for Girls, Philadelphia merged with West Philadelphia Catholic High School for Boys to become West Philadelphia Catholic High School in 1989
- Villa Maria Academy, Erie merged into Cathedral Preparatory School in 2022

== Rhode Island ==
- Lincoln School, Providence (co-ed PK, all-girls K–12)
- St. Mary Academy – Bay View, Riverside (PK–12)

Former

- Bishop Keough Regional High School, Pawtucket (1971–2015)
- Mary Balch's School, Providence
- Overbrook Academy, Smithfield (closed 2024)

== South Carolina ==
- Ashley Hall, Charleston (PK–12)

== Tennessee ==
- Girls Preparatory School, Chattanooga (6–12)

Memphis

- Hutchison School (PK–12)
- St. Agnes Academy-St. Dominic School (co-ed PK, gender separate K–6, co-ed 7–8, all-girls 9–12)
- St. Mary's Episcopal School (PK–12)

Nashville

- Harpeth Hall School (5–12)
- St. Cecilia Academy (7–12)

Former

- Fairmount College, Mounteagle (1872–1918)
- Immaculate Conception Cathedral School, Memphis (1921–2024)

== Texas ==
- Talkington School for Young Women Leaders, Lubbock (6–12)
- Young Women's Leadership Academy, Midland (6–12)

Austin

- Ann Richards School for Young Women Leaders (6–12)
- The Texas Girls School (6–8)

El Paso

- Loretto Academy (co-ed PK–5, all-girls 6–12)
- Young Women's Leadership Academy (6–12)
- Young Women's STEAM Academy (6–12)

Dallas-Fort Worth

- Hockaday School, Dallas (PK–12)
- Irma Lerma Rangel Young Women's Leadership School, Dallas (6–12)
- Mesorah High School for Girls, Dallas (9–12)
- Ursuline Academy, Dallas (9–12)
- Young Women's Leadership Academy, Fort Worth (6–12)
- Young Women's STEAM Academy at Balch Springs Middle School, Balch Springs (6–8)
- Solar Preparatory School for Girls at James B. Bonham, Dallas (PK–8)

Houston

- Aldine Young Women's Leadership Academy (9–12)
- Duchesne Academy (PK–12)
- Incarnate Word Academy (9–12)
- KIPP Voyage Academy for Girls
- Saint Agnes Academy (9–12)
- Young Women's College Preparatory Academy (6–12)
- The Young Women's Leadership School (6–12)

San Antonio

- Incarnate Word High School (9–12)
- Providence High School (9–12)
- Young Women's Leadership Academy (6–12)
- Young Women's Leadership Academy: Primary (K–5)

Closed

- St. Francis Academy, San Antonio (1960–2002)

Merged

- Dominican High School, Galveston merged with Kirwin High School and Ursuline Academy to become O'Connell College Preparatory School in 1968
- Young Women's Leadership Academy at Arnold, Grand Prairie was consolidated with the Young Men's Leadership Academy to create Bill Arnold Middle School in 2025

== Virginia ==
- Foxcroft School, Middleburg (9–12)
- Madeira School, McLean (9–12)
- Oakcrest School, Vienna (6–12)
- Village School, Charlottesville (5–8)

Richmond

- St. Catherine's School (PK–12)
- Saint Gertrude High School (9–12)

In addition, King Abdullah Academy, while coeducational, has separate girls' secondary classes.

Former

- Blackstone College for Girls, Blackstone (1894–1950)
- St. Margaret's School, Tappahannock (1921–2025)

== Washington (state) ==
- Annie Wright Schools, Tacoma (co-ed PK–8, all-girls 9–12)
- Forest Ridge School of the Sacred Heart, Bellevue (5–12)
- Holy Names Academy, Seattle (9–12)
- Lake Washington Girls Middle School (6-8)
- Seattle Girls' School, Seattle (5–8)

== Wisconsin ==
Milwaukee

- Divine Savior Holy Angels High School (9–12)
- St. Joan Antida High School (9–12)

Former

- Milwaukee College, Milwaukee (1848–1895)
- St. Clara Female Academy, Sinsinawa (1846–1882)
- Wisconsin Industrial School for Girls, Milwaukee (1875–1976)

== Guam ==
- Academy of Our Lady of Guam, Hagåtña (9–12)

Became coeducational

- Notre Dame High School (Guam), Talofofo

== See also ==
- Online School for Girls
- Women's education in the United States
- Women's colleges in the United States
  - Timeline of women's colleges in the United States
- List of boys' schools in the United States
