= List of schools in the Archdiocese of Newark =

The following is a list of schools of the Archdiocese of Newark. As of the Fall of 1987, there were 40 high schools and 187 elementary schools in the four counties of the archdiocese. At the start of the school year in 2023, there were 22 high schools and 49 elementary schools. As of April 2025, the archdiocese operates 67 Catholic elementary and secondary schools enrolling nearly 22,000 students in Bergen, Essex, Hudson and Union counties.

== K-12 schools ==
Essex County

- Lacordaire Academy (Upper Montclair)
- St. Benedict's Preparatory School (Newark) Co-ed Elementary Division (K-6) and Middle School Division (7-8) added in 2017 with takeover of St. Mary School. Girls prep division (9-12) added in 2020 with closure of Benedictine Academy, Elizabeth.

Union County

- Oak Knoll School of the Holy Child (Summit)

== 7-12 schools ==
Hudson County

- St. Dominic Academy (Jersey City)

Union County

- Oratory Preparatory School (Summit)

== High schools ==
Bergen County

- Academy of the Holy Angels (Demarest)
- Bergen Catholic High School (Oradell)
- Don Bosco Preparatory High School (Ramsey)
- Immaculate Conception High School (Lodi)
- Immaculate Heart Academy (Washington Township)
- Paramus Catholic High School (Paramus)
- St. Joseph Regional High School (Montvale)
- St. Mary High School (Rutherford)

Essex County

- Mount Saint Dominic Academy (Caldwell)
- St. Benedict's Prep (Newark) (see K-12 above)
- St. Vincent Academy (Newark)
- Seton Hall Preparatory School (West Orange)

Hudson County

- Hudson Catholic Regional High School (Jersey City) (nearly closed in 2008 but went co-ed and got a reprieve)
- St. Peter's Preparatory School (Jersey City)
- Kenmare High School* (Jersey City)

* Alternative school financially independent of archdiocese.

Union County

- Mother Seton Regional High School (Clark)
- Roselle Catholic High School (Roselle) - merged with Girls Catholic High School, Roselle, in 1983
- Union Catholic Regional High School (Scotch Plains) - the separately run boys and girls schools were merged in 1979

== K-8 schools ==
=== Bergen County ===
- Academy of the Most Blessed Sacrament (Franklin Lakes)
- Academy of Our Lady (Glen Rock)
- Academy of Our Lady of Mount Carmel (Tenafly)
- Academy of Our Lady of Grace (Fairview)
- Academy of St Paul (Ramsey) Formerly known as St. Paul School and St. Paul Interparochial School
- Christ the Teacher Academy (Interparochial) (Fort Lee)
  - The churches sponsoring the school are: Holy Trinity and Madonna in Fort Lee, Epiphany in Cliffside Park, and Holy Rosary in Edgewater. It occupies the former facility of the Madonna Catholic School. Epiphany joined after Epiphany School merged into Christ the Teacher in 2005.
- Corpus Christi School (PreK-8) (Hasbrouck Heights)
- Notre Dame Academy (Interparochial) (Palisades Park)
- Our Lady of Mercy Academy (Interparochial) (Park Ridge)
- Queen of Peace School (North Arlington)
- Sacred Heart School (Lyndhurst)
- St. Elizabeth School (Wyckoff)
- St. John Academy (Interparochial) (Hillsdale)
- St. Joseph School (Oradell)
- St. Leo's School (Elmwood Park)
- St. Peter Academy (River Edge)

=== Essex County ===
Newark

- St. Benedict's Prep School Elementary Division (see K-12 schools above)
- St. Michael School

Other municipalities

- Good Shepherd Academy (Nutley)
- Our Lady of the Lake School (Verona)
- Our Lady of Sorrows School (South Orange)
- St. Catherine of Siena School (Cedar Grove)
- St. Joseph School (East Orange)
- St. Peter School (Belleville)
- St. Rose of Lima Academy (Short Hills)
- St. Thomas the Apostle School (Bloomfield)
- St. Cassian School (Upper Montclair)

=== Hudson County ===
Jersey City

- Our Lady of Czestochowa School, also known as the OLC School, had about 480 students in 2017. It opened a second campus for grades 3–8 in the Boys & Girls Club of Hudson County building in 2018 to accommodate additional students, as its enrollment was 540 in August 2018. The Great Futures Charter High School, which previously operated out of the Boys & Girls Club building, dissolved earlier that year, allowing OLC to take space in the building.
- Sacred Heart School
- St. Aloysius Elementary Academy
- St. Joseph School
- St. Nicholas School

Union City

- St. Francis Academy

Other municipalities

- Academy of St. Joseph of the Palisades (West New York)
- All Saints Catholic Academy (Bayonne) - It was a merger of four Catholic schools and was established on July 1, 2008 in the ex-Saint Mary, Star of the Sea site. The building was repurposed to house a consolidated student body, with a preschool room designated from the former kindergarten facility. It was to house students associated with the eight Catholic churches in the municipality, and the archdiocese classified it as a "Deanery school". The school opened on September 3, 2008. At the time of opening over 500 students attended, with about 450 in grades Kindergarten through 8 and the remainder in preschool. At the time it had 22 teachers, five teaching aides, and three other employees. The predecessor schools in early 2008 had a combined total of 750-800 students.
  - The Roman Catholic Archdiocese of Newark announced in September 2007 that it would combine Bayonne's four remaining Catholic elementary schools — Our Lady of Mt. Carmel (Bayonne, New Jersey), Saint Andrew, Saint Vincent and Saint Mary, Star of the Sea — into a single school in response to 10 years of declining enrollments in the schools. Sister Eileen Jude Wust was selected to serve as the school's principal. In 2017 ASCA was recognized as a National Blue Ribbon School.
- Hoboken Catholic Academy (Hoboken)
  - Its students are in Hoboken and Weehawken. A consolidation of existing Catholic schools, it was formerly co-sponsored by four Hoboken churches, Our Lady of Grace, St. Ann, St. Francis, and Sts. Peter and Paul, along with St. Lawrence Church in Hoboken, before the archdiocese's Lighting the Way program changed the allocation of money for schools in the archdiocese.

=== Union County ===
- The Academy of Our Lady of Peace (New Providence) - The school was once a winner of the National Blue Ribbon Award. The archdiocese spent, each year, $277,000 to fund the school. In 2020 the archdiocese announced it would close in the wake of the COVID-19 pandemic. In response members of the school community started a fundraising drive to try to get it to reopen, and the archdiocese announced it would reopen, with the congregation taking financial control.
- Holy Trinity School (Westfield)
- Koinonia Academy (Plainfield)
- Oak Knoll School of the Holy Child Lower School (Summit) (private school not directly operated by the archdiocese)
- St. Bartholomew Academy (Scotch Plains)
- St. John the Apostle School (Clark)
- St. Joseph the Carpenter School (Roselle)
- St. Michael School (Cranford)
- St. Michael School (Union)
- St. Teresa of Avila School (Summit)
- St. Theresa School (Kenilworth)

== Early childhood centers ==
- Assumption Early Childhood Center (Emerson) - Formerly Assumption Academy, it was a full PK-8 school. In 2008 it had 171 students in its K-8 program. This decreased to 157 in 2011 and 137 in 2012. The 1-8 grades closed in 2012 and it became only a preschool and kindergarten.

== Former schools ==
The archdiocese closed nine schools in the period from 1989 to 1995. From 1999 to 2014 the student body decreased to only 60% of the initial total. In 2005 seven schools consolidated and/or closed.

From 1998 to 2008 the archdiocese closed about 25% of its schools. Three more schools were shuttered and an additional seven merged in 2009. In 2010 and 2012 it closed six elementary schools each. In addition, in the latter year, one high school was closed and one PK-8 school became preschool/kindergarten only. The 2012 closures were influenced by the schools taking funds from their congregations while their enrollment numbers declined. In 2014 the archdiocese four elementary schools, with one in each of its counties; after those closures it had 70 elementary schools remaining. In 2020 it closed one high school and nine K-8 schools due to a decrease in enrollments.

Circa 2008 the archdiocese considered 225 to be the minimal optimal enrollment for a K-8 school.

=== Former high schools ===
Bergen County

- Queen of Peace High School (North Arlington) closed 2017
- St. Cecilia High School (Englewood) closed 1986

Essex County

- Christ the King Preparatory School, later Cristo Rey Newark High School (Newark) closed 2020
- Essex Catholic High School (East Orange) closed 2003
- Immaculate Conception High School (Montclair) closed 2025
- Marylawn of the Oranges High School (South Orange)
- Our Lady of Good Counsel High School (Newark) closed 2006

Hudson County

- Academy of St. Aloysius (Jersey City) closed 2006
- Academy of the Sacred Heart (Hoboken) closed 2006
- Caritas Academy (Jersey City) closed 2008. Was a merger of the Academy of St. Aloysius of Jersey City and Sacred Heart of Hoboken.
- Holy Family Academy (Bayonne) closed 2013
- Holy Rosary Academy (Union City)
- Marist High School (Bayonne) closed 2020
- St. Aloysius High School (Jersey City) closed 2007
- St. Anthony High School (Jersey City) closed 2017
- St. Cecilia (Kearny) closed 1982
- St. Joseph of the Palisades High School (West New York) closed 2009
- St. Mary High School (Jersey City) closed 2011
- St. Michael's High School (Union City) closed by 1989

Union County

- Benedictine Academy (Elizabeth) closed 2020 - resurrected as a girls division of St. Benedict's Prep, Newark, in 2020
- Girls Catholic High School (Roselle) merged with Roselle Catholic High School - formerly all boys - in 1983
- Sacred Heart High School (Elizabeth) closed 1969
- St. Mary of the Assumption High School (Elizabeth) closed 2019
- St. Patrick High School (Elizabeth) closed 2012 (a new non-Catholic incarnation, The Patrick School, opened in 2012 and operates in Hillside)

=== Former K-8 schools ===
==== Bergen County (former) ====
Schools include:

- Academy of Saint Therese of Lisieux, formerly St. Therese School (Cresskill) - Closed 2020
- Annunciation School (Paramus) Merged in 1991 with Sacred Heart of Rochelle Park and Our Lady of the Visitation of Paramus into Visitation Academy; closed 2025
- Ascension School (New Milford)
- Epiphany School (Cliffside Park) - Merged into Christ the Teacher School in 2005.
- Garfield Catholic Academy (Garfield)
- Holy Family Interparochial School (Norwood)
- Holy Trinity School (Hackensack)
- Most Sacred Heart of Jesus School (Wallington) - It closed in 2014. Circa 2004-2014 the archdiocese spent more than $3 million to keep the school in operation.
- Mother Cabrini Interparochial School (Lodi)
- Notre Dame Interparochial Primary School (Ridgefield)
- Our Lady of the Assumption School (Wood-Ridge) - It closed in 2010.
- Our Lady of Mount Carmel (Ridgewood) - Merged with St. Catharine School, Glen Rock, to become Academy of Our Lady
- Sacred Heart (Rochelle Park) - Merged in 1991 with Annunciation and Our Lady of the Visitation of Paramus into Visitation Academy; closed 2025
- St. Anne School (Fair Lawn) - Closed 2020
- St. Catharine School (Glen Rock) - Merged with Our Lady of Mount Carmel, Ridgewood, to become Academy of Our Lady
- St. Cecilia Interparochial School (Englewood)
- St. Elizabeth Seton Interparochial School (Fair Lawn)
- St. Francis School (Hackensack)
- St. Francis of Assisi School (Ridgefield Park) - It closed in 2010.
- St. John School (Leonia)
- St. John the Evangelist School (Bergenfield)
- St. Joseph School (East Rutherford) - closed in 2010.
- St. Joseph/Sacred Heart School (Demarest)
- St. Mary School (Closter)
- St. Mary School (Dumont)
- St. Michael School (Lyndhurst)
- St. Philip the Apostle School (Saddle Brook)
- St. Thomas More Interparochial School (Midland Park)
- The Academy at Saint Mary (Rutherford)
- St. Joseph Academy (Bogota)
- Transfiguration Academy (Bergenfield)
- Visitation Academy (Paramus) - closed 2025. Formed in 1953 as Our Lady of the Visitation, it was consolidated in 1991 as Viisitation Academy Interparochial, affiliated with Sacred Heart in Rochelle Park and Annunciation in Paramus.

==== Essex County (former) ====
Schools include:

Newark

- Academy of St. Benedict - It had 250 students in 2004. Merged into Ironbound Catholic Academy in 2005.
- Aquinas Academy (Livingston) - closed 2025
- Blessed Sacrament School - It was located in the South Ward. It opened circa 1916, and historically each class had around 40 students. Mary Jo Patterson of The New York Times described it as one of two schools with "proud histories and fiercely loyal adherents." Paterson stated its building was "hopelessly obsolete, with a history of few renovations." In 2005 it had 159 students. Enrollment declined after, the following year, the church made the tuition $2,900 per year and also required each parent to raise $400. Enrollment declined even more when, in 2008, parents were now obligated to raise $900 each and tuition was raised higher, to over $3,000. In December 2007 enrollment was down to 97, and this went down further to 95 by April 2008, with fewer than 10 were Catholic; the number of students who also attend the school's parish was below 10. In December 2017 Rev. Anselm I. Nwaorgu, the pastor of Blessed Sacrament, cited the low enrollment and asked the Newark Archdiocese to allow him to close Blessed Sacrament School. The school was to close in June of that year. A charter school was scheduled to occupy its space; charter schools had been asking the church for information on its school space prior to the closure. Former Academic director Alice Terrell stated that the drop in enrollment and closure resulted from an increase in charter schools.
- Ironbound Catholic Academy - closed 2020
  - On the site of the former St. Casimir Catholic School, it was formed by the merger of St. Casimir, Academy of St. Benedict, and St. Lucy Filippini Academy.
- Our Lady of Good Counsel School - Closed in 2005.
- Queen of Angels School - It was in the Central Ward and belonged to a church, established in 1930, that was the city's first church catering to African-Americans. Its building dated from 1887, and Patterson described its school building, connected to the worship building, as "a confusing warren of rooms" and "hopelessly obsolete, with a history of few renovations." Patterson described the institution as one of two schools with "proud histories and fiercely loyal adherents." In 2008 it had about 200 students, with fewer than 20 were Catholic, and the number of students who also attend the school's parish was below 20. Due to the number of students enrolled, Patterson stated at the time it was "not in danger" of closing. In 2008 each parent was asked to raise $300 at fundraisers and the annual tuition was $2,900. It closed in 2012.
- Sacred Heart School
- St. Antoninus School
- St. Casimir Academy - It had 220 students in 2004. It merged into Ironbound Catholic Academy in 2005, with the new school occupying the former St. Casimir.
- St. Columba School
- St. Francis Xavier School - closed 2020
- St. John the Baptist School
- St. Lucy School
- St. Lucy Filippini Academy - Merged into Ironbound Catholic Academy in 2005.
- St. Mary School - Merged into St. Benedict's Prep School Elementary Division in 2017
- St. Rocco School
- St. Rose of Lima School
- St. Stanislaus School

Bloomfield

- Sacred Heart School
- St. Thomas the Apostle School

Irvington

- Good Shepherd Academy - Closed 2020
- Sacred Heart of Jesus School - Merged into St. Leo/Sacred Heart Interparochial School.
- St. Leo School - Merged into St. Leo/Sacred Heart Interparochial School.
- St. Leo-Sacred Heart Interparochial School - Merger of St. Leo and Sacred Heart schools, closed in 2012.
- St. Paul the Apostle School

Maplewood

- Immaculate Heart of Mary School
- St. Joseph School - It opened circa 1930. Circa 2003 it had 310 students; by 2010 the enrollment was down to 165. The archdiocese initially announced it proposed closing the school that year, parents started a campaign to keep the school open; the archdiocese replied by stating that as long as prospective enrollment went up to 210, the school could continue, but by June 2010 the projected enrollment was only 140, with the number having formally registered and whose parents/guardians had paid tuition expenses being 102. It closed in 2010.

Orange

- Our Lady of Mt. Carmel School
- St. John School - closed in 2012.

West Orange

- Blessed Pope John XXIII Academy - Closed in 2014.
- Our Lady of Lourdes School
- St. Joseph School

Other municipalities

- Our Lady Help of Christians School (East Orange) - Closed 2020
- Trinity Academy (Caldwell) - Closed 2020

==== Hudson County (former) ====
Schools include:

Jersey City

- Assumption/All Saints School - Merged into St. Patrick's School in 2005.
- Holy Rosary School
- Our Lady of Mt. Carmel School
- Our Lady of Mercy School
- Our Lady of Victories School
- Resurrection School - the result of the creation of the Parish of the Resurrection, which was formed in 1997 and merged St. Boniface church and the schools of St. Bridget, St. Mary, St. Peter and Holy Rosary. St. Bridget's School building was used for the lower school and Holy Rosary School building was used for the upper school. - closed 2013
- St. Aedan School
- St. Anne School - It was located in Jersey City Heights, and opened in 1904. Its enrollment declined by 33 in 2011 and increased by 22 in 2012. James Carroll, a member of the Jersey City Police Department and a member of the school board, Carroll stated that the 2011 decline was due to parents being afraid that the school would close. In 2011 the archdiocese considered closing the school, but a fundraising generated sufficient money to keep it open. It closed in 2012. That year the building housed the K-8 grades of the Hoboken Charter School on a temporary basis as the regular K-8 building of the charter school had a fire.
- St. Bridget School
- SS. John & Ann Interparochial School
- St. Mary School
- St. Patrick School
- St. Paul School
- St. Paul of the Cross School
- St. Peter School

Bayonne

- Our Lady of Mt. Carmel School
- Our Lady of the Assumption School
- St. Andrew School
- St. Mary, Star of the Sea School - In 2007 it had 184 students. The following year it merged into All Saints Catholic Academy.
- St. Vincent de Paul School

Hoboken

- John Paul II Interparochial School
- Our Lady of Grace School - closed in 1999; merged into John Paul II Interparochial School
- St. Anne School - school building used for John Paul II Interparochial School, which became Hoboken Catholic Academy
- St. Francis School - merged into John Paul II Interparochial School
- SS. Peter & Paul School - merged into John Paul II Interparochial School

Kearney

- Mater Dei Academy - It opened in 2009 as a merger of St. Stephen School, Kearney, and Holy Cross School, Harrison. Its initial enrollment was 250, but this declined to 170 for the 2011–2012 school year; the school closed in 2012.
- Sacred Heart School
- St. Cecilia School - closed in 2002
- St. Stephen School - Merged into Mater Dei Academy in 2009

Union City

- Mother Seton School - Merged into Mother Seton Interparochial School in 2005.
- St. Anthony School - Merged into Mother Seton Interparochial School in 2005.
- St. Augustine School - Merged into Academy of St. Joseph of the Palisades in West New York in 2020
- St. Michael School - Merged into Mother Seton Interparochial
- Mother Seton Interparochial - Merged into Academy of St. Joseph of the Palisades in West New York in 2020

Other municipalities

- Holy Cross School (Harrison) - Merged into Mater Dei Academy in Kearny in 2009.
- Immaculate Conception School (Secaucus) - closed in 2009
- Our Lady of Libera School (West New York) - closed in 2010.
- St. John Nepomucene School (North Bergen) - closed in 2004

==== Union County (former) ====
Schools include:

Elizabeth

- Bender Memorial Academy - It was a private school not directly operated by the archdiocese. It closed in 2005.
- Blessed Sacrament School - Its neighborhood was historically Irish American. (closed in 2008, merged into Our Lady of Guadalupe School)
- Elizabethport Catholic School - It formed in 1996, from a merger St. Adalbert's, SS. Peter and Paul, and St. Patrick's. The school was to use all three buildings, with Peter and Paul having preschool, St. Adalbert housing grades 1–4, and St. Patrick for grades 5–8. By 1998 the St. Patrick building served as the upper school, another building was used as a lower school, and a separate building was used for the office of its director. Elizabethport Catholic's initial projected enrollment was 500; the combined enrollment meant that the school could have classes for high-level students, athletic programs, and after school programs, things lacking in the predecessor schools. Its proposed initial annual tuition was $1,500, which some parents believed would be too expensive. Its prospective students, as of the 1990s, were African-American, Hispanic American, and Portuguese American, with less than half being Catholic.
- Holy Rosary School
- Immaculate Conception School
- Our Lady of Guadelupe School (Interparochial) - Merged into St. Joseph's School in Roselle in 2020
- Sacred Heart School
- St. Adalbert School - The land for the school and church building was dedicated on November 6, 1906. Historically many of the students were Polish American. Circa the 1980s there were what the church's website called "improvements". By the 1990s its students came from other ethnic backgrounds. Enrollment declined after the 1980s. It merged into Elizabethport Catholic, with the merger scheduled for 1996.
- St. Anthony of Padua School - Its neighborhood historically was Italian American. (closed in 2008, merged into Our Lady of Guadalupe School)
- St. Catherine School - Its neighborhood was historically Irish American.
- St. Genevieve School - It was in the Elmora neighborhood. It closed in 2020.
- St. Hedwig School- Historically Polish school (closed 2002)
- St. Mary of the Assumption School (closed 2008, merged into Our Lady of Guadalupe School)
- St. Michael's School - Historically German school
- St. Patrick's School - It was located in the Elizabethport neighborhood. Historically its students were Irish American. By the 1990s its students came from other ethnic backgrounds. It merged into Elizabethport Catholic, with the merger scheduled for 1996.
- Sts. Peter and Paul School - Historically many of the students were Lithuanian American. By the 1990s its students came from other ethnic backgrounds. It merged into Elizabethport Catholic, with the merger scheduled for 1996.
- St. Vladimir School - Historically Ukrainian school (closed by the parish in 1990)

Hillside

- Christ the King School
- Hillside Catholic Academy - A merger of Catholic schools, it opened in 2006 with 256 students. In 2011 it had 165 students, and this went down to 156 in 2012. Closed in 2012.

Linden

- St. Elizabeth of Hungary School - merged into Saints Mary and Elizabeth Academy in 2004
- Saints Mary and Elizabeth Academy (a 2004 merger of St. Elizabeth's of Linden and St. Mary's of Rahway) - Closed in 2014.
- St. Theresa School

Other municipalities

- Holy Spirit School (Union) - Closed in 2020
- Little Flower School (Berkeley Heights) - Closed in 1988
- St. Agnes School (Clark) - Closed in 2014.
- St. Anne School (Garwood) - Closed in 1986
- St. James the Apostle School (Springfield) - Closed in 2020
- St. Mary School (Rahway) - Merged into Saints Mary and Elizabeth Academy, based in Linden, in 2004
