= Catholic Conference (MIAA) =

Massachusetts high-school sports conference

- Conference: MIAA
- Division: I
- No. of teams: 10 - 6 Boys / 4 Girls
- Region: Greater Boston

The Catholic Conference is a Massachusetts high school athletic conference whose member institutions are located primarily in Eastern part of Massachusetts. Its nine members include only all-boys and all-girls Catholic high schools. The Catholic Conference participates in the Massachusetts Interscholastic Athletic Association (MIAA) Division I in sports competitions.

The Catholic Conference is regarded as one of the most accomplished sports conferences in terms of its winning reputation, with 17 state football championships, 9 basketball championships, 34 ice hockey championships, and 15 swimming championships.

== Member schools ==
=== Current members ===
The Catholic Conference consists of 10 member institutions located primarily in Eastern Massachusetts. The geographic domain of the conference stretches from Shrewsbury in the west to Hingham in the east and from Danvers in the north to Westwood in the south.

On July 1, 2021, St. John's High School of Shrewsbury formally joined the Catholic Conference as the sixth boys' school. The Pioneers played the 2020-21 season in the Catholic Conference bubble due to the COVID-19 pandemic.

The 10 members of the Catholic Conference are:

Institution	Location	Founded	Joined	Type	Nickname	Colors
Boys’ Division
Boston College High School	Boston	1863		Private	Eagles	
Catholic Memorial School	West Roxbury	1957	1957	Private	Knights	
Malden Catholic High School	Malden	1936		Private	Lancers	
St. John's High School	Shrewsbury	1898	2021	Private	Pioneers	
St. John's Preparatory School	Danvers	1907		Private	Eagles	
Xaverian Brothers High School	Westwood	1963	1963	Private	Hawks	
Girls’ Division
Fontbonne Academy	Milton	1954		Private	Ducks	
Malden Catholic High School	Malden	1936		Private	Lancers	
Notre Dame Academy	Hingham	1853		Private	Cougars	
Ursuline Academy	Dedham	1819		Private	Bears	

Catholic Conference
Locations of Catholic Conference members, 2021-2022 Boys division member Girls division member Former member

=== Former members ===
School	Location	Type	Founded	Joined	Left	Division	Current Conference	Nickname
Don Bosco Technical High School	Boston	Private	1946	1946	1998	Boys	None (Closed)	Bears
Mount Alvernia High School	Newton	Private	1935		2023	Girls	None (Closed)	Mustangs
Mount Saint Joseph Academy	Boston	Private				Girls	None (Closed)	Phoenix
Nazareth Academy	Wakefield	Private	2009		2016	Girls	None (Closed)	Dragons
Our Lady of Nazareth Academy	Wakefield	Private	1947		2009	Girls	None (Closed)	Dragons

== Ice hockey ==
The Catholic Conference boasts very strong hockey programs. The conference has combined to win the Super 8 Hockey Tournament 22 times since its inception in 1991. Catholic Memorial has won the tournament 13 times, Boston College High School has won 6 times, and Malden Catholic has won 5 times.

Super 8 Championships

School	Appearances	Wins	Losses	Championships	Years won
Catholic Memorial School	17	61	15	13	2009, 2005, 2004, 2003, 2001, 2000, 1999, 1998, 1995, 1994, 1993, 1992, 1991
Boston College High School	14	48	18	6	2019, 2018, 2007, 2006, 2002, 1996
Malden Catholic High School	8	29	6	5	2016, 2014, 2013, 2012, 2011
St. John's Preparatory School	10	12	18	1	2015
Xaverian Brothers High School	2	3	4	0	

== Rivalries ==
Rivalries
BC High	Catholic Memorial
BC High	St. John's Prep
Xaverian	St. John's Prep
Xaverian	Catholic Memorial
Catholic Memorial	St. John's Prep
Malden Catholic	St. John's Prep
