= School District 122 =

School District 122 may refer to:

- Harlem School District 122
- La Salle Elementary Public Schools No 122
- New Lenox School District 122
- Ridgeland School District 122
