= Academy of the Sacred Heart =

Academy of the Sacred Heart may refer to:

- Academy of the Sacred Heart, Bloomfield Hills, Michigan
- Academy of the Sacred Heart, Grand Coteau, Louisiana
- Academy of the Sacred Heart (New Orleans, Louisiana)
- Academy of the Sacred Heart, the original name of Manhattanville College in Purchase, New York
- Buffalo Academy of the Sacred Heart, Amherst, New York
- Sacred Heart Academy (Redlands, California)
- Sacred Heart Academy (Hamden, Connecticut)
- Sacred Heart Academy (Kentucky), Louisville, Kentucky
- Academy of the Sacred Heart (New Jersey), Hoboken, New Jersey
- Sacred Heart Academy (New York), Hempstead, New York
- Sacred Heart Academy (Cincinnati, Ohio)
- Sacred Heart Academy High School (Mt. Pleasant, Michigan)
- Sacred Hearts Academy, Hawai'i
- Flintridge Sacred Heart Academy, La Canada, California

== See also ==
- Sacred Heart school (disambiguation)
- Sacred Heart (disambiguation)
