= 2023 LaSalle chemical plant fire =

Chemical fire in LaSalle, Illinois

LaSalle Fire
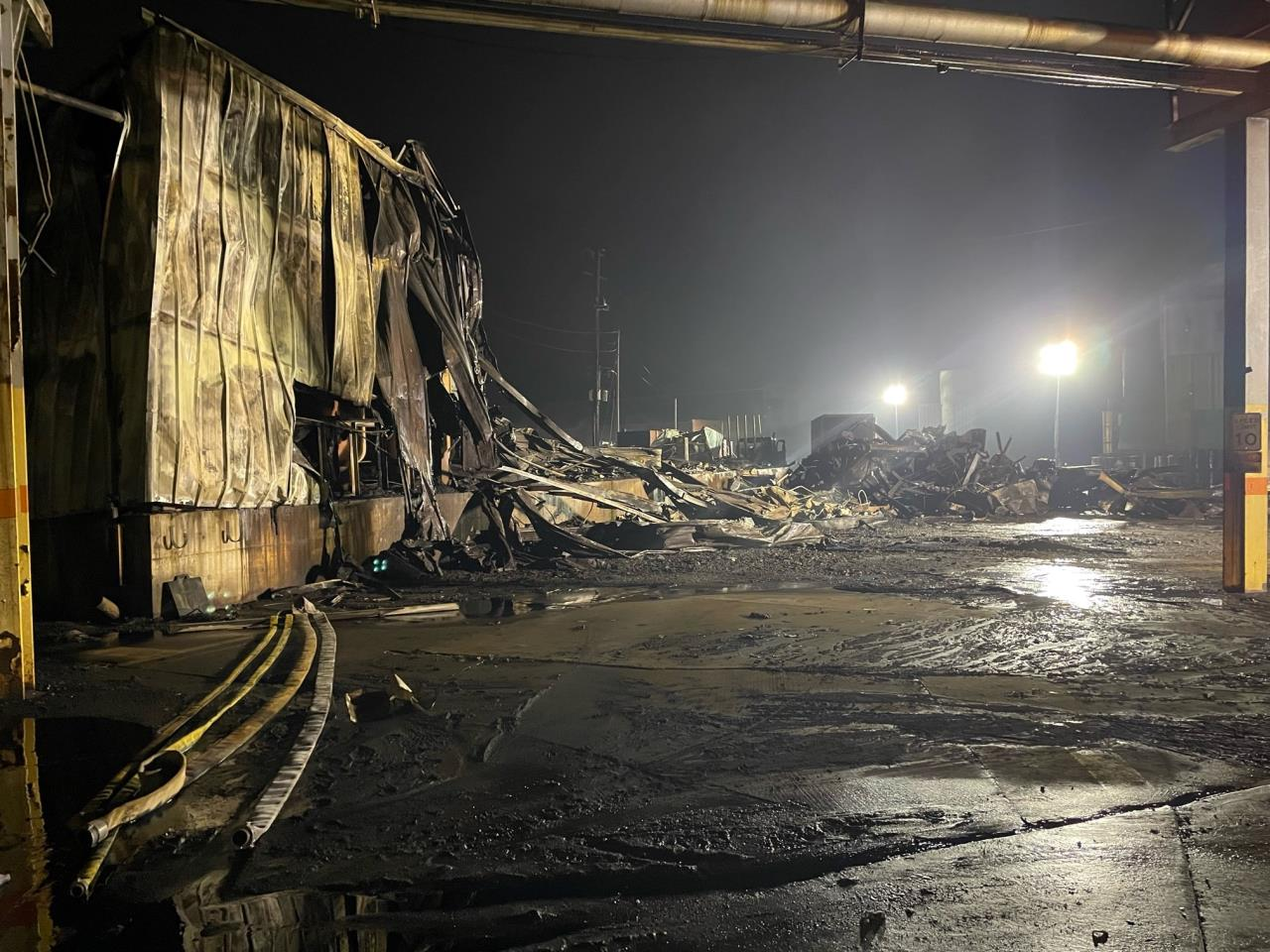
- EPA photo of burned area
- Location: Carus, 1500 8th St, La Salle, IL 61301; 41.336632°N 89.085968°W
- Deaths: 0
- Injuries: 0 – 2 (reports vary)
- Footage: Explosions, massive fire reported at La Salle chemical plant Wednesday on YouTube

At around 9 am on Wednesday, January 11, 2023, the Carus Chemical plant in La Salle, Illinois, was involved in a major fire. The plant, which is located about 90 miles (140 km) from Chicago and 80 miles (130 km) from the Quad Cities and was used for manufacturing water treatment products, caught fire. Residents in communities near the plant reported hearing sounds of explosions before and during the fire. Employees were evacuated from the premises, and a shelter in place order was announced for the wards of the city downwind of the fire. The shelter in place was originally going to be lifted at 3 pm, but was not officially lifted until 5 pm.

A "green substance" was reported to be on surfaces around the site following the incident, and residents were warned not to touch it. It was later revealed to be an oxidizer from the chemical plant. A statement was released by the La Salle Police Department saying that the chemicals could be "deactivated" with a mix of water, hydrogen peroxide, and vinegar. The substance was later identified as potassium permanganate.

The fire chief of La Salle, Jerry Janick, had a media meeting around noon on the 11th where he stated he could not confirm reports of explosions, but did reiterate that all employees were safe from the blaze. On the same day at 1:00 pm, the company that operated the plant, Carus LLC (Carus Group Inc.), officially announced the fire was "under control", and confirmed that all employees had escaped safely and been accounted for.

== Background ==
Carus is a family-owned chemicals company that had operated in La Salle for over 100 years. Carus Chemical was the second-largest employer in La Salle as of 2013.

After the fire, CBS Chicago researched the company's past complaints and uncovered that they had been investigated by the Illinois State EPA for multiple violations since 2019, but no further action was taken after the plant agreed to fix the problems.

== Cause ==
The cause of the fire remained unknown through January and February as investigations were underway. Carus LLC announced on January 30 that they had hired a third-party consultant to determine the root. The cause of the fire was revealed on March 30 when Carus posted a press release stating they had determined it was caused by friction between a forklift and spilled potassium permanganate. They determined chemicals had spilled from a supersac while being transported to a truck, and ignited when a forklift moved pallets around it.

== Response ==
The fire started from a container in the shipping area and spread to become a four-alarm fire, with the La Salle Fire Department receiving assistance from nearby agencies including the Peru, Illinois fire department and LaSalle County emergency management teams.

Videos of the flames were shared on Storyful and later used in news reports of the incident. Some social media videos showed flames shooting into the sky, and a plume of smoke and steam that could be seen for miles.

== Impact ==
During the fire, over one million pounds of chemicals were burned. Following the fire, it was determined that the Carus warehouse needed to be torn down.

Carus opened a community hotline later on the 11th for community members to call for information about the fire and guidance on cleaning up property damaged by the fire and debris. Initial news reports said zero workers and one firefighter were reported to be injured from the incident, No update was published on the firefighter's condition, but later reports announced zero injuries.

The city announced on the 11th that the school district would continue operations as normal on the following day, and that it was safe to return to work.

As part of the cleanup process, the Illinois EPA started testing the air quality to make sure it was safe to breathe as residents were concerned that the air quality might not be safe due to chemical released from the plant. Although there was a shelter-in-place order during the burning, there was never an order for residents to wear masks due to air quality concerns. The air quality was determined to be safe to breathe within a day after the fire.

The United States EPA also tested the air quality in locations around town and made sure the nearby Little Vermilion River was not contaminated.
