= Elizabeth High School =

Elizabeth High School may refer to:

Australia

- Elizabeth High School, Elizabeth, South Australia (from 1961 – 1988, see Playford International College)

United States

- Elizabeth High School (New Jersey) – Elizabeth, New Jersey
- Elizabeth High School (Colorado) – Elizabeth, Colorado
- Elizabeth High School (Louisiana) – Elizabeth, Louisiana
- Elizabeth Forward High School – Elizabeth, Pennsylvania
- Elizabeth Seton High School – Bladensburg, Maryland
- St. Elizabeth Academy – St. Louis, Missouri
- St. Elizabeth High School (California) – Oakland, California
- St. Elizabeth High School (Delaware) – Wilmington, Delaware
- St. Elizabeth High School (Missouri) – St. Elizabeth, Missouri
- Academy of Saint Elizabeth – Convent Station, New Jersey
- Cape Elizabeth High School – Cape Elizabeth, Maine
