= Universal School =

Private, Islamic School, in Bridgeview, Illinois

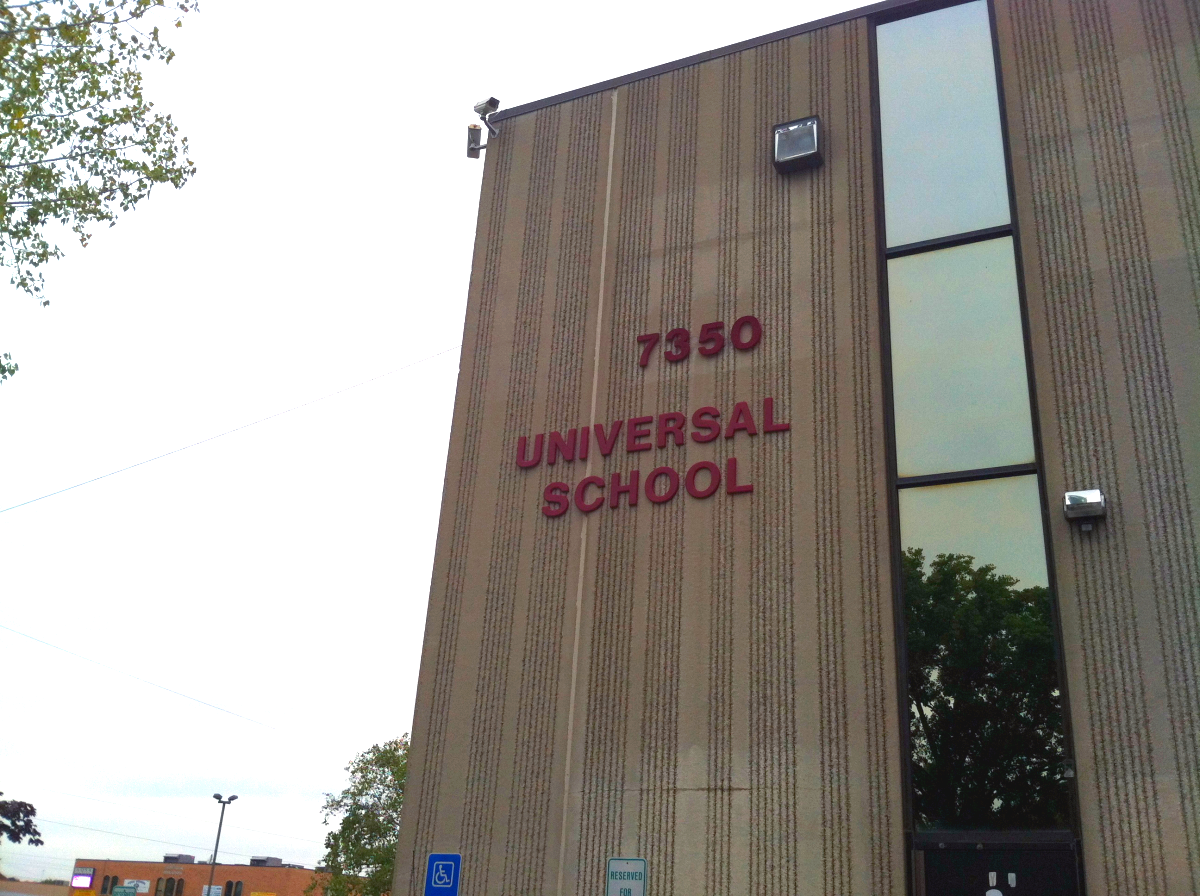

Location
- 7350 West 93rd Street; Bridgeview, Illinois; 41°43′23″N 87°48′7″W

Information
- School type: Private, religious school
- Motto: "Where Islam and Education Come Together"
- Religious affiliation: Islam
- Established: September 4, 1990
- Founder: Doctor Abdulrahman Amine
- Superintendent: Safaa Zarzour
- Grades: K-12
- Classes: Quran, science, social studies, computers, library kindergarten-
- Team name: Universal Stars
- Newspaper: Constellation

Universal School is an Islamic, religious, K-12 private school, that is located in Bridgeview, Illinois, in the Chicago metropolitan area. Students take Islamic Studies, Arabic language, and Quran classes. The school motto is "Where Islam and Education come together." Universal School was officially founded in 1989, and opened on September 4, 1990, to 165 students and 11 faculty members.

As of 2016 the superintendent is a Syrian American man named Safaa Zarzour, who also served as the head of the Chicago office of the Council on American Islamic Relations (CAIR).

== History ==
Impetus to establish an Islamic school occurred after a wave of Arab immigration came in the 1970s and 1980s to the southwest Chicago suburbs; Palestinians were a large group within this wave. According to Craig N. Joseph and Barnaby Riedel, authors of "Islamic Schools, Assimilation, and the Concept of Muslim American Character," "Universal School owes its existence to" the Muslim immigration wave and to the Bridgeview Mosque. Three doctors decided to establish an Islamic school. The Islamic Development Bank gave the founders of the school a loan to have the facility built, and Muslims around the U.S. gave their own donations to the founders. In 1988 groundbreaking occurred, and on September 4, 1990, the school opened its doors. The Illinois State Board of Education recognized the school in 1992.

In its first school year the institution had 11 employees and 140 students. As of 2005 the school had 638 students. By 2008 there were over 50 employees and over 600 students.

== Campus ==
The campus is adjacent to the Muslim American Society Chicago offices; the Aqsa School, another K-12 Islamic school, the Bridgeview Mosque, and a youth center. It is across the street from Mosque Foundation.

The building, made up of gray concrete, uses mirror-tinted windows oriented in a lengthwise manner. It has 36 classrooms, including dedicated rooms for preschool and kindergarten-aged children. It also has a cafeteria and lunchroom located in the basement, as well as two laboratories, and a basketball court. Joseph and Riedel stated that the school building that the concrete and windows "define" the building, which is "long, squat, and institutional in appearance." Due to the appearance and its perceived role in sheltering students from influences and anti-Islamic sentiment in the outside world, students gave the building "the box" as its nickname.

== Operations ==
It is not affiliated with the Bridgeview Mosque, which is adjacent to the school. Marguerite Michaels of Time stated that "The Universal School makes clear its independence from the[...]Bridgeview mosque." It is also not affiliated with Aqsa School.

As of 2005 the tuition for each student was $4,500 to $4,900.

Students in grades Pre-Kindergarten through grade 5 attend coeducational classes, while for grades six through ten boys and girls are in separate classes. In grades 11 and 12 boys and girls sit separately but attend the same classes.

Female students are required to wear hijabs in middle school and high school, while in lower levels doing so is optional. Male students may not have body piercings, and this ban extends to earrings.

== Curriculum ==
In 2008 Barnaby B. Riedel, author of "Universal Particularism: Making an Ethical Islamic School in Chicago," wrote that some Islamic teachers at Universal School desired more instruction dedicated to specific Islamic schools of thought, although the majority believed in using a more general approach to teach the religion.

== Extracurricular activities ==
The athletic teams play in the Metropolitan Prep Conference. Among the sports offered are boys' basketball and volleyball. The school also offers basketball, wrestling, volleyball, and soccer.

As of 2021 the school also has spelling bees, a science fair club, a mathematics league, and a student newspaper.
