= Betty Ring =

American decorative arts researcher and collector

Betty Abrego Ring
- Born: Betty Ruth Abrego; March 18, 1923; Beaumont, Texas
- Died: May 5, 2014 (aged 91); Houston, Texas

Betty Abrego Ring (March 18, 1923 – May 5, 2014) was an American decorative arts specialist. She was a researcher and collector of early and Colonial American needlework, and is considered one of the most prominent figures in early American schoolgirl embroidery.

== Life and career ==
Betty Ruth Abrego was born in Beaumont, Texas on March 18, 1923, to parents Nellie (née Fitzsimmons) and Claude Abrego. As a young girl, her family moved frequently due to her father's work as a dredging engineer. She attended the University of Texas, leaving and marrying Gregg Ring after two years. They had seven children between 1948 and 1963. During this period and outside her time parenting, she began collecting and studying antiques. Ring purchased her first needlework sampler in 1960, which began her collection of American 18th and 19th century embroideries.

Around 1963, Ring joined the Heritage Society in Texas, becoming a volunteer for the Kellum-Noble House. She became a board member in 1965 and served as president of the Heritage Society from 1965 to 1967. In 1967, she became a docent for Bayou Bend. There, Ring became a protégé of Ima Hogg and organized "An Exhibition of Eighteenth and Early Nineteenth Century American Needlework", and began giving lectures alongside the exhibit.

=== Needlework research ===
In the 1960s, Ring started studying "mourning embroideries", a style of needlework craft that began in the early 1800s in the United States. These types of silk embroideries featured figures near urn-topped pedestals, often set in gardens or cemeteries with weeping willows and angels. She researched their origins, finding that students created them usually because they were fashionable, rather than for grief. Ring later wrote, "It was mourning embroideries that really aroused my curiosity and led to an intense interest in schoolgirl needlework."

During Ring's studies, there was a lack of research and writing on mourning embroideries. In 1965, Ring traveled to Chapel Hill in North Carolina to visit Elizabeth Daniel, a dealer and collector of silk memorials. When she saw Daniel's collection of embroideries together in one place, she realized that the needlework shared similar stylistic features. This led her to believe that early American embroidery pieces were not made independently of one another, but were instead made with similar styles through the instruction of individual teachers.

Ring traveled across the U.S. collecting needlework samplers, analyzing them, and researching genealogical records to trace 18th and 19th century schoolgirl embroidery. For decades before this, American 18th and 19th century needlework samplers were thought to be amateur works made from original patterns. Ring's research showed that, rather than original creations, most samplers and silk embroidery followed patterns laid out by school mistresses for their students. Ring's research also revealed that needlework of that time had distinct styles or motifs that could be traced back to specific schools or teachers.

Starting in 1967, Ring began giving lectures on needlework samplers. She wrote for Antiques magazine, writing her first article about needlework in 1971, titled "Memorial Embroideries by American Schoolgirls."

In the 1980s, Ring conducted research on schoolgirl needlework, including that of Rhode Island school mistress Mary Balch and her students' needlework, for an exhibit called Let Virtue Be a Guide to Thee - Needlework in the education of Rhode Island Women, 1730-1830. In addition to being a guest curator of the Rhode Island exhibit, she created the catalogue book, Let Virtue Be a Guide to Thee (1983). The exhibit went on to be held at the Houston Museum of Fine Arts and the Metropolitan Museum of Art in New York.

In 2012, Sotheby's held an auction of pieces from her collection that grossed more than $4,000,000. Ring died on May 5, 2014, in Houston, Texas, at the age of 91.

== Bibliography ==
- Needlework, An Historical Survey (1976), editor
- Let Virtue Be a Guide to Thee (1983)
- American Needlework Treasures (1987)
- Girlhood Embroidery, American Samplers & Pictorial Needlework 1650-1850 (two volumes) (1993)
