= Ann Ayscough Sands =

American educator (1761–1851)

Ann Ayscough Sands (January 5, 1761 – July 17, 1851) was an American educator. She was the founder of the first public school ever established in Brooklyn, New York. St. Ann's Church, the first Episcopal church in that city, was named in her honor.

== Biography ==
Ann Ayscough was born in New York City, January 5, 1761. Her father, Dr. Richard Ayscough, was a surgeon in the British army, and her mother was a Langdon, while a still more remote ancestor was a Cuyler, one of the original Dutch settlers from Holland. She was married to Joshua Sands, March 9, 1780. In 1813, she was the principal founder and the first directress of the Loisian Seminary and therefore, indirectly, was the founder of the first public school ever established in Brooklyn. She was also the president of the Brooklyn Dorcas Society. She died of a pulmonary affection on July 17, 1851, at the age of 90. She had twelve children, six of whom preceded her in death.
