= Katherine Whelan Brown =

American politician

Katherine Brown (née Whelan; November 15, 1872 – October 3, 1942) was the first female Democrat elected to the New Jersey State Legislature. She subsequently served on the Hudson County Board of Chosen Freeholders.

Brown organized the Democratic women of Jersey City's eighth ward immediately after the passage of the 19th Amendment and remained leader of their club until her death.

As a two-term assemblywoman (1922–23), she introduced early efforts at gun control and helped to pass a night work bill, which was intended to protect women by prohibiting them from working in factories during the overnight hours. As a member of the Hudson County Board of Chosen Freeholders (1925–1935), she was responsible for oversight of the county hospitals and institutions at Snake Hill (which she renamed Laurel Hill) and oversaw the planning and opening of the Margaret Hague Maternity Hospital.

An ally of Jersey City Mayor Frank Hague, she campaigned for Democrats across the state and attended both the 1932 Democratic National Convention and Franklin D. Roosevelt's 1933 inauguration.

== Personal life ==
Born into a politically active family in Jersey City, she spent her early years in a block of tenements at 134-136 Dudley Street, owned by her paternal grandparents, William Whelan Sr. (c. 1820–1888) and Catherine Maher (c. 1825–1901). Katherine's father, William Henry Whelan (c. 1849–1928), served as president of Jersey City's Board of Public Works in the 1880s and was influential in Democratic politics during that period; her grandfather had run unsuccessfully for city alderman in 1870.

Brown attended Public School Number 1 and the Academy of St. Aloysius in Jersey City. She married James A. Brown on June 25, 1912, at St. Peter's Catholic Church in Jersey City.

During World War I, Brown was active in war work and visited military camps in New York and New Jersey, where she entertained the troops with readings and recitations.

In poor health by the late 1930s, she gradually withdrew from public life and died at her home, 329A Arlington Avenue, on October 3, 1942.

== Sources ==
- Jersey Journal, Oct. 5, 1942, p. 1. "Mrs. Brown, Ex-Lawmaker, Long Ill, Dies"
- Jersey Journal, Dec. 30, 1932, p. 9. "Mrs. Brown First Woman Ever To Serve 3 Terms as Freeholder"
- Fitzgerald's Legislative Manual, State of New Jersey, Volume 146, p 324, accessed via Google Books.
