= Julia Morgan School for Girls =

Girls middle school in Oakland, California, U.S.

Location
- 5000 MacArthur Boulevard, #25; Oakland, Alameda County, California 94613; United States; 37°47′01″N 122°11′15″W

Information
- Type: Private, Middle school
- Established: 1999
- Head of school: Kathrina Weekes
- Grades: Sixth grade-Eighth grade
- Gender: Girls
- Campus: Leased from Mills College at Northeastern University
- Campus size: 135 acres
- Sports: Soccer, cross country, basketball, volleyball
- Team name: Hericanes
- Yearbook: Blueprint
- Tuition: $43,575 (2025-2026)
- Alumni: 1,200
- Website: www.juliamorganschool.org

Julia Morgan School for Girls is an all-girls middle school in Oakland, California, named for Julia Morgan, the building's architect and the first woman to be licensed in California as an architect. The school is housed in a historical and architecturally significant building that she designed. The building was constructed in 1924 and was originally used for the Ming Quong Home for Chinese Girls, an orphanage. It was purchased and donated to Mills College in 1936 and became known as Graduate House. After 1960, it was known as Alderwood Hall. In 2004, the building was renovated for use as the Julia Morgan School for Girls. The building is located at 5000 MacArthur Boulevard.

From 1925 until 1937, the building was used as an orphanage. After being purchased by Mills College in 1936, it was known mainly as the Graduate House until 1960. Later it was used as a conference area, for classrooms, and as a residence hall until 2004. In 2004, it was leased to Julia Morgan School for Girls. Morgan designed many of the buildings on the Mills College campus.

== History ==
The land was donated in 1918 and the building opened in December 1925. The construction of the orphanage cost $125,000. As the Ming Quong Home, the building was owned by the Presbyterian Board of Missions (New York City) and functioned as an orphanage for Chinese girls. The building was constructed with the help of Donaldina Cameron to alleviate the overcrowding of young inhabitants in San Francisco's Chinatown. The orphanage was named Ming Quong because it means "radiant light." The building was purchased and donated to Mills College by Captain Robert Dollar. Aurelia Reinhardt showed public approval of the addition while she actively tried to petition that the orphanage not be constructed in fear that it would bring down the neighborhood and college's value. As such a row of pine trees was planted to hide the building from campus visitors.

In 2004, the building was converted to an all-girl middle school under Julia Morgan's name. Rooms in the building are named in reference to the building's history.

== Architecture ==
The 2-story concrete building has a U-shape. Its architecture mixes the Spanish eclectic style with Asian features. The building includes stucco walls and terra cotta roof tiles on the wings. The central part of the building is capped by a cross gable roof. The building includes casement windows "with an Asian-inspired muntin design". The entryway includes a grand staircase leading to a stone portal decorated with urns and statuary.

Chinese graduate students at Mills designed the reflecting pond in the building's entrance courtyard. The open glade where Seminary Creek was once located flow before being forced underground into a culvert, came to be known as the Alderwood Dell.

The 2004 renovation created classrooms, offices, a cafeteria, a library, and a multi-purpose room and the glade became a playing field. Mitchell and Riera Architecture was responsible for the interior re-design.

== School ==
Since becoming an all-girl middle school in 1999, the institute remains dedicated to equity and service with annual events like Gift of Giving. Gift of Giving is a night devoted to community engagement and service. Julia Morgan has left a lasting effect on the school and it remains committed to girl power and STEAM fields with programs like GO GIRL (Girls Out Getting Involved in Real Life) and the Invention Convention.

The private all-girl school has been noted in media.

== See also ==
- List of works by Julia Morgan
- List of girls' schools in the United States
