= Hoboken Charter School =

Charter school in Hudson County, New Jersey, US

Location
- K-8: 713 Washington Street; 9-12: 360 First Street, 2nd Floor; Hoboken, Hudson County, New Jersey 07030; United States; 40.745268471457074°N 74.02836363132312°W

Information
- Type: Public charter school
- Established: January 15, 1997; 29 years ago
- NCES School ID: 340003200302
- Principal: Elizabeth Palma (K-8); Joanna Weintraub (9-12)
- Faculty: 22.0 FTEs
- Grades: K-12
- Enrollment: 299 (as of 2023–24)
- Student to teacher ratio: 13.6:1
- Colors: Red and white
- Athletics conference: Independent
- Team name: Cougars
- Website: www.hobokencs.org

Hoboken Charter School is a K-12 charter school in Hoboken, in Hudson County, in the U.S. state of New Jersey.

As of the 2023–24 school year, the school had an enrollment of 299 students and 22.0 classroom teachers (on an FTE basis), for a student–teacher ratio of 13.6:1. There were 50 students (16.7% of enrollment) eligible for free lunch and 3 (1.0% of students) eligible for reduced-cost lunch.

== History ==
On January 15, 1997, Leo Klagholz, the New Jersey Commissioner of Education, enacted the school's charter. The school opened in 1997 with classes in the Demarest Building and had its charter extended for five years in 2001. In 2010, the school moved its K-8 students into the former Academy of the Sacred Heart building.

In 2012, the K-8 building was hit by a fire categorized as three alarms; it would be unavailable until September 2013. The former St. Anne's School (of the Roman Catholic Archdiocese of Newark) in Jersey City Heights was the temporary class location. Additionally Hurricane Sandy in late 2012 had disrupted operations of the school.

In 2013 Arne Duncan, U.S. Secretary of Education in the Obama administration, released a YouTube video praising the school.

== Athletics ==
The Hoboken Charter High School Cougars compete independently in interscholastic sports under the supervision of the New Jersey State Interscholastic Athletic Association (NJSIAA).
