= Marywood Academy =

- U.S. National Register of Historic Places
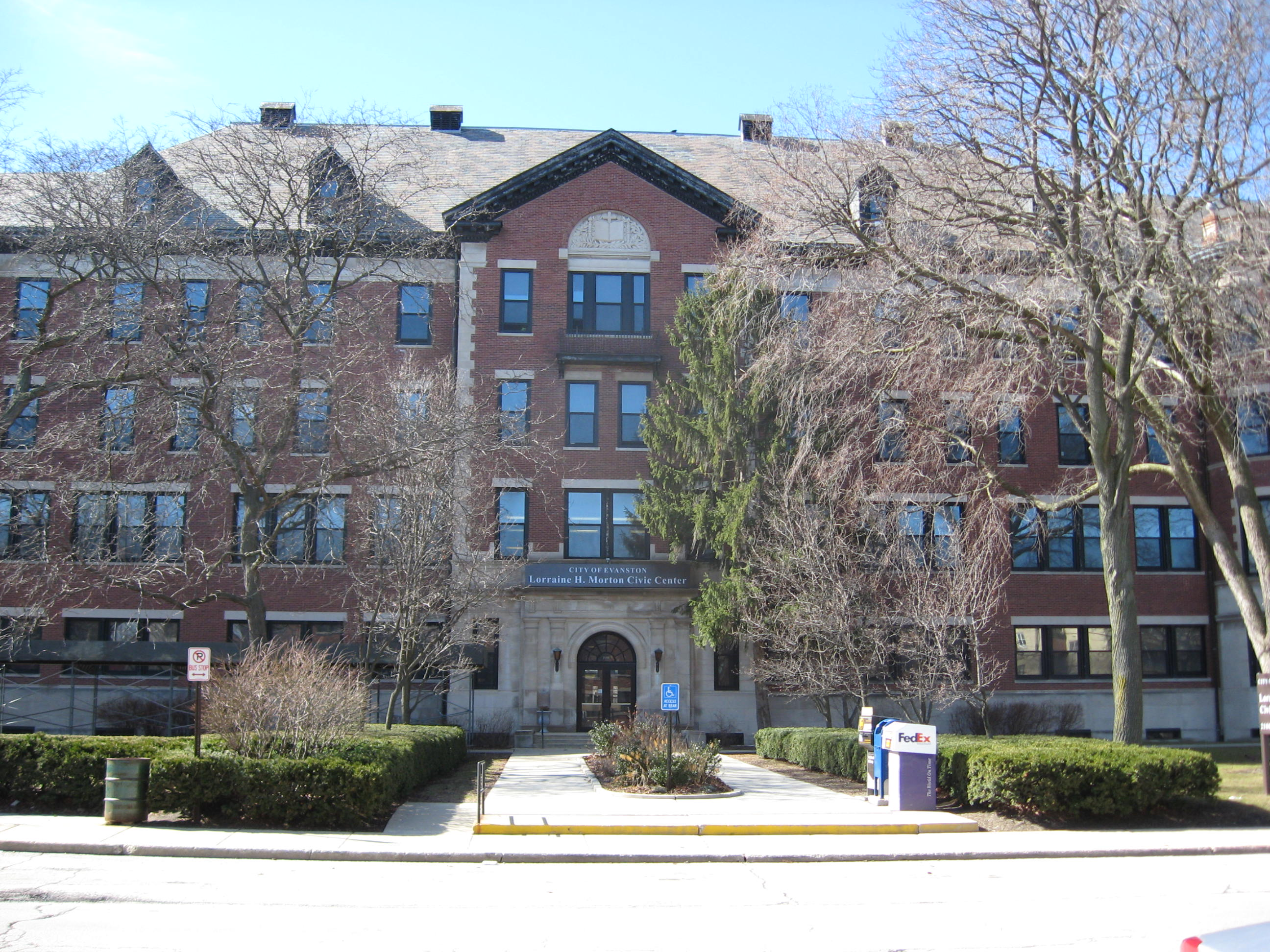

- Location within Illinois Location within the United States
- Location: 2100 Ridge Ave., Evanston, Illinois
- Coordinates: 42°3′24″N 87°41′14″W
- Area: 9 acres (3.6 ha)
- Built: 1900
- Architect: Schlacks, Henry
- Architectural style: Georgian Revival
- NRHP reference No.: 06000007
- Added to NRHP: February 9, 2006

The Marywood Academy is a historic building located at 2100 Ridge Avenue in Evanston, Illinois. The building was built in 1900 as Visitation Academy to serve as a girls' Catholic school led by the Visitation Sisters. Architect Henry J. Schlacks gave the building a Georgian Revival design that featured a tripartite massing with a base, middle, and cornice; limestone quoins and belt courses; and Doric pilasters and an architrave molding around the entrance. The Sisters of Providence purchased the school in 1915 and renamed it Marywood Academy; the school operated as Marywood Academy until 1970, reaching a peak enrollment of 532 in the 1964–65 school year. The building was later sold to the City of Evanston and served as the city's civic center from 1979 thru March, 2025.

The building was added to the National Register of Historic Places on February 9, 2006.
