= Young Women's Leadership Academy at Arnold =

Bill Arnold Middle School

Location
- 1204 East Marshall Drive; Grand Prairie, Dallas County, Texas 75051; United States
- 32°43′19″N 96°59′19″W

Information
- Type: Public school
- Established: 2002
- School district: Grand Prairie Independent School District
- Principal: Dexter Dixon
- Teaching staff: 59.73 (FTE) (2018–19)
- Grades: 6–8
- Enrollment: 814 (2018–19)
- Student to teacher ratio: 13.63:1 (2018–19)
- Colors: Red; Black; White
- Team name: Arnold Tigers
- Website: www.gpisd.org/arnold

Bill Arnold Middle School is a public middle school located in Grand Prairie, Texas, serving grades 6 through 8. It is part of the Grand Prairie Independent School District (GPISD) and is situated at 1204 E Marshall Drive, Grand Prairie, TX 75051.

== History ==
In the 2024–2025 academic year, Bill Arnold Middle School underwent significant restructuring. The Young Women's Leadership Academy (YWLA) and Young Men's Leadership Academy (YMLA) for grades 6–8 were consolidated to form a comprehensive middle school with a leadership focus under the Bill Arnold Middle School name. This change aimed to provide a dynamic learning experience that encourages critical thinking, inspires confidence, and nurtures intellectual and social development necessary for success in college, career, and life.

== Leadership ==
As of the 2024–2025 school year, Dexter Dixon serves as the principal of Bill Arnold Middle School. With 14 years in education, Principal Dixon leads the school in its mission to foster leadership and academic excellence.

== Extracurricular activities ==
The school offers various extracurricular activities aimed at developing leadership skills and positive character traits. Students have the opportunity to participate in community service projects, including the Presidential Service Award program, and engage in numerous leadership development opportunities.

== Demographics ==
According to data from the 2023–2024 school year, Bill Arnold Middle School has an enrollment of approximately 652 students. The student body is diverse, reflecting the multicultural community of Grand Prairie.

== Feeder schools ==
Bill Arnold Middle School receives students from various elementary schools within the Grand Prairie ISD. These feeder schools include Austin Elementary School, Daniels Elementary School, Eisenhower Elementary School, Hector Garcia Elementary School, Hobbs Williams Elementary School, James Bowie Elementary School, Juan Seguin Elementary School, Milam Elementary School, Sallye Moore Elementary School, Sam Rayburn Elementary School, and Travis Elementary School.

== Notable events ==
In late 2018, the school added a new administration building, enhancing the facilities available to students and staff.
