= Lyons Female College =

American girls' school

Lyons Female College (also known as Lyons Girl's Seminary; later, Our Lady of Angels Seminary) was an American girls' school. located at 407 22nd Avenue North, Clinton, Iowa.

== Establishment ==
At the time of its establishment, there was a great interest taken in the education of young ladies. Public high schools had not then arrived at an excellence surpassing "seminaries" and "academies" in thoroughness and extent of study. Accordingly, there was a constant series of experiments and plans concerning the higher female education. The school was founded in the Lyons neighborhood of Clinton, Iowa before the Civil war, its dedication occurring on September 15, 1858.

== History ==
The founder of the Lyons College was Rev. John Covert, who was also identified with other similar institutions in Ohio and Indiana, and who had an impracticable idea of uniting them and the Lyons College into one system, with a central university at Chicago, Illinois or St. Louis, Missouri. The first prospectus of the institution made high promises. At first, the institution was well patronized, but owing to the workings of the injudicious scholarship system, and financial bungling by Covert, the attendance began to dwindle, a prejudice against the school was developed, and its reputation and value equally depreciated.

In 1866, the institution passed to Rev. G. P. Moore, assisted by a classical teacher, Prof. M. Soules, of Lyons, and a corps of other teachers. For awhile, the institution revived. An arrangement was made by which it should pass under the control of the Presbytery of Iowa. Subsequently, Revs. Hanna and F. A. Chase, each for one year, were Principals, the college afterward reverting to Moore. He conducted it for several years, but at no time did the institution adopt Soules' advice and keep pace with the progress of educational ideas, and therefore, failed financially. Accordingly, Moore, to save himself from complete financial loss, concluded to dispose of the unprofitable property.

== Our Lady of Angels Seminary ==
On October 2, 1872, the institution was purchased for US$10,000 by the Sisters of Charity of the Blessed Virgin Mary. For the first two years, the Sisters worked under many disadvantages, as the seminary buildings were so nearly a complete wreck that they had to be practically renovated. With subsequent additions and improvements, the school became a leading Catholic institution of Iowa. Thirteen teachers had charge of the Primary, Preparatory, Grammar, Academic, Musical and Art Departments. Those who passed creditably through the Academic or Classical Course received the graduating gold medals of those departments. The co-educational boarding school had one hundred scholars in 1878. Our Lady of Angels Seminary closed in 1966.

== Demolition ==
In the 1980s, the school buildings were demolished.
