= Hawthorn Leadership School for Girls =

Girls' charter school in St. Louis, Missouri

Coordinates: 38.666°N 90.260°W

Hawthorn Leadership School for Girls was a public all girls' charter middle and high school in St. Louis, Missouri. It was chartered by Washington University in St. Louis and has a focus on science, technology, engineering and math (STEM). It is Missouri's first public girls' school.

Mary Stillman, one of the daughters of John Danforth and an alumna of all girls' schools, had conceptualized Hawthorn.

In August 2015 it opened 130 students in grades 6 and 7. A new grade will be added each year until it gets grade 12. The school shut its doors in August 2023, citing declining enrollment.
