= Bridgeview, Illinois =

- Village
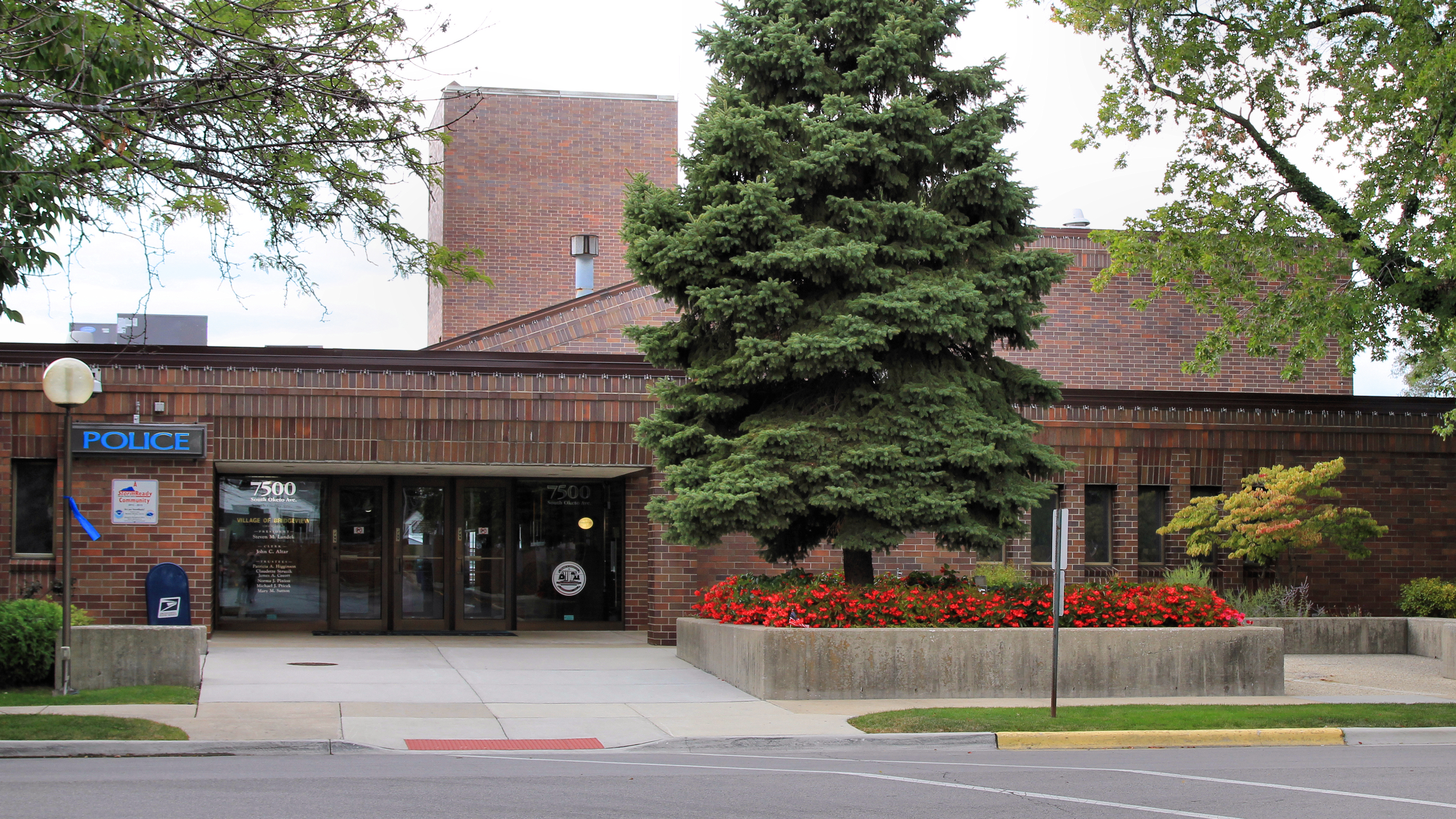
- Village Hall

- Seal
- Motto: A Well Balanced Community
- Location of Bridgeview in Cook County, Illinois

- Location within Greater Chicago Location within Illinois Location within the United States
- Coordinates: 41°45′N 87°48′W
- Country: United States
- State: Illinois
- County: Cook
- Townships: Lyons, Palos, Stickney, Worth
- Incorporated: 1947

Government
  - Type: Mayor–trustee
  - Mayor: Steven Landek

Area
  - Total: 4.13 sq mi (10.70 km^{2})
  - Land: 4.13 sq mi (10.70 km^{2})
  - Water: 0 sq mi (0.00 km^{2}) 0%

Population (2020)
  - Total: 17,027
  - Density: 4,120.2/sq mi (1,590.83/km^{2})
- Up 3.5% from 2010

Standard of living (2015–19)
  - Per capita income: $24,474
- ZIP Code: 60455
- Area codes: 708/464
- Geocode: 17-08225
- FIPS code: 17-08225
- Website: www.bridgeview-il.gov

Bridgeview is a village in Cook County, Illinois, United States. It is located approximately 15 miles (24 km) southwest of the Chicago Loop. As of the 2020 census, the village population was 17,027.

== History ==
The earliest European settlement in Bridgeview occurred in the 1830s, when the area was still populated by Native American groups. By the 1870s German and Italian settlers began moving into the area for farming purposes. Dutch migrated to the area by the 1920s, at which time farming began to decline; real estate and industry began to develop the area considerably. After Lake Michigan water became available to the area, the population grew significantly. The Bridgeview Community Club was founded in 1938 and became the center of local activities.

The first Palestinians arrived in the 1890s and by 2024, an area between Midway International Airport and a SeatGeek soccer stadium was home to "Little Palestine", the largest Palestinian enclave in the United States.

Bridgeview was incorporated in 1947 with an initial population of approximately 500 residents. Local residents chose the name "Bridgeview" by one vote over "Oketo", which remains a street name in the village today. The term "Bridgeview" connotes views of the area from the Harlem Avenue bridge, 79th Street bridge and 87th Street bridge.

Arab Americans are a growing presence, making up 10.8 percent of the population in 2020. In 1981, an Islamic social club was established and by 1984 it had become a mosque. Two Islamic schools in Bridgeview educate hundreds of students from K-12.

Bridgeview's motto is "A Well Balanced Community", as the village's zoning is divided equally into residential, commercial, and industrial areas. Its proximity to Chicago's Midway Airport and downtown, along with access to major highways, has made it a crossroads of the inner southwest suburbs.

The Fifth District Circuit Court of Cook County is located in Bridgeview near 103rd Street and 76th Avenue.

== Geography ==
According to the 2021 census gazetteer files, Bridgeview has a total area of 4.13 square miles (10.70 km^{2}), all land.

The village has a roughly rectangular shape; its borders running north and south stagger between 8300 West and 6800 West, but can generally be defined as between Roberts Road and Harlem Avenue. The southern border of the town is 103rd Street between 76th Avenue and Harlem. The northern border is staggered between 6700 South on the west side of the rail tracks and 6900 South on the east side of the rail tracks.

Bridgeview borders the following communities: Bedford Park, Nottingham Park (unincorporated Cook County, often considered part of Chicago due to its 60638 ZIP code), Burbank, Oak Lawn, Chicago Ridge, Palos Hills, Hickory Hills and Justice.

Bridgeview is 15 miles (24 km) southwest of the Chicago Loop.

== Demographics ==
Historical population
Census	Pop.	Note	%±
1950	1,393		—
1960	7,334		426.5%
1970	12,506		70.5%
1980	14,155		13.2%
1990	14,402		1.7%
2000	15,335		6.5%
2010	16,446		7.2%
2020	17,027		3.5%
U.S. Decennial Census; 2010 2020

=== Racial and ethnic composition ===
Bridgeview village, Illinois – Racial and ethnic composition Note: the US Census treats Hispanic/Latino as an ethnic category. This table excludes Latinos from the racial categories and assigns them to a separate category. Hispanics/Latinos may be of any race.
Race / Ethnicity (NH = Non-Hispanic)	Pop 2000	Pop 2010	Pop 2020	% 2000	% 2010	% 2020
White alone (NH)	12,589	12,574	11,287	82.09%	76.46%	66.29%
Black or African American alone (NH)	126	450	658	0.82%	2.74%	3.86%
Native American or Alaska Native alone (NH)	25	11	15	0.16%	0.07%	0.09%
Asian alone (NH)	340	489	564	2.22%	2.97%	3.31%
Pacific Islander alone (NH)	0	2	4	0.00%	0.01%	0.02%
Other race alone (NH)	83	23	67	0.54%	0.14%	0.39%
Mixed race or Multiracial (NH)	727	319	441	4.74%	1.94%	2.59%
Hispanic or Latino (any race)	1,445	2,578	3,991	9.42%	15.68%	23.44%
Total	15,335	16,446	17,027	100.00%	100.00%	100.00%

• Bridgeview is especially well-known as a central hub for the state's Muslim community, housing the Mosque Foundation and a large network of Islamic institutions and halal businesses.

• Statewide, Illinois has the highest per capita Muslim population of any U.S. state (around 350,000 to over 450,000 residents as of 2022), with the vast majority living in the Greater Chicago metropolitan area (Cook, DuPage, and Will counties).

=== 2020 census ===
As of the 2020 census, Bridgeview had a population of 17,027. There were 3,807 families residing in the village. The median age was 37.9 years; 23.5% of residents were under the age of 18 and 15.9% were 65 years of age or older. For every 100 females there were 101.3 males, and for every 100 females age 18 and over there were 99.8 males age 18 and over.

100.0% of residents lived in urban areas, while 0.0% lived in rural areas. The population density was 4,119.77 inhabitants per square mile (1,590.65/km^{2}), and there were 6,156 housing units at an average density of 1,489.47 per square mile (575.09/km^{2}). Of Bridgeview's housing units, 4.4% were vacant; the homeowner vacancy rate was 1.7% and the rental vacancy rate was 5.0%.

There were 5,888 households in Bridgeview, of which 34.3% had children under the age of 18 living in them. Of all households, 49.1% were married-couple households, 19.9% were households with a male householder and no spouse or partner present, and 25.7% were households with a female householder and no spouse or partner present. About 25.7% of all households were made up of individuals and 12.0% had someone living alone who was 65 years of age or older. The average household size was 3.27 and the average family size was 2.68.

=== Income and poverty ===
The median income for a household in the village was $55,102, and the median income for a family was $64,281. Males had a median income of $40,097 versus $32,451 for females. The per capita income for the village was $26,074. About 11.5% of families and 14.5% of the population were below the poverty line, including 22.0% of those under age 18 and 9.6% of those age 65 or over.

== Sports ==
Bridgeview was the home of the Chicago Fire professional Major League Soccer team between 2006 and 2019, whose stadium was funded and operated by the village. SeatGeek Stadium is also home of the NISA's team, Chicago House AC, the Fire Reserves, the Chicago Red Stars of the National Women's Soccer League and the Chicago Hounds of Major League Rugby. Toyota Park hosted the 2006 Major League Soccer All-Star Game, and continues to be a premier venue for concerts and music festivals.

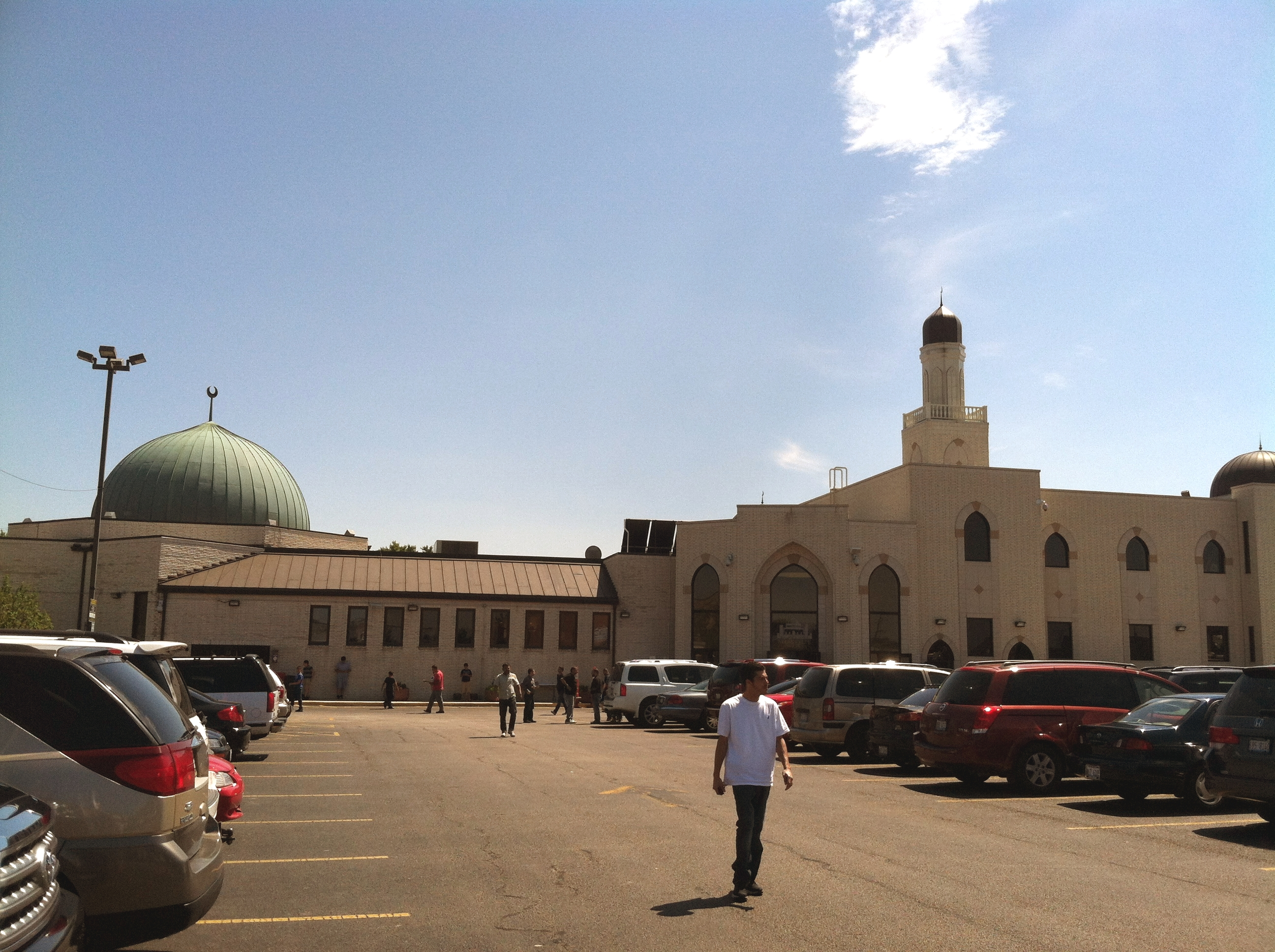
Mosque Foundation, the center of Islamic life in Bridgeview

== Government ==
Bridgeview is in Illinois's 6th congressional district.

== Education ==
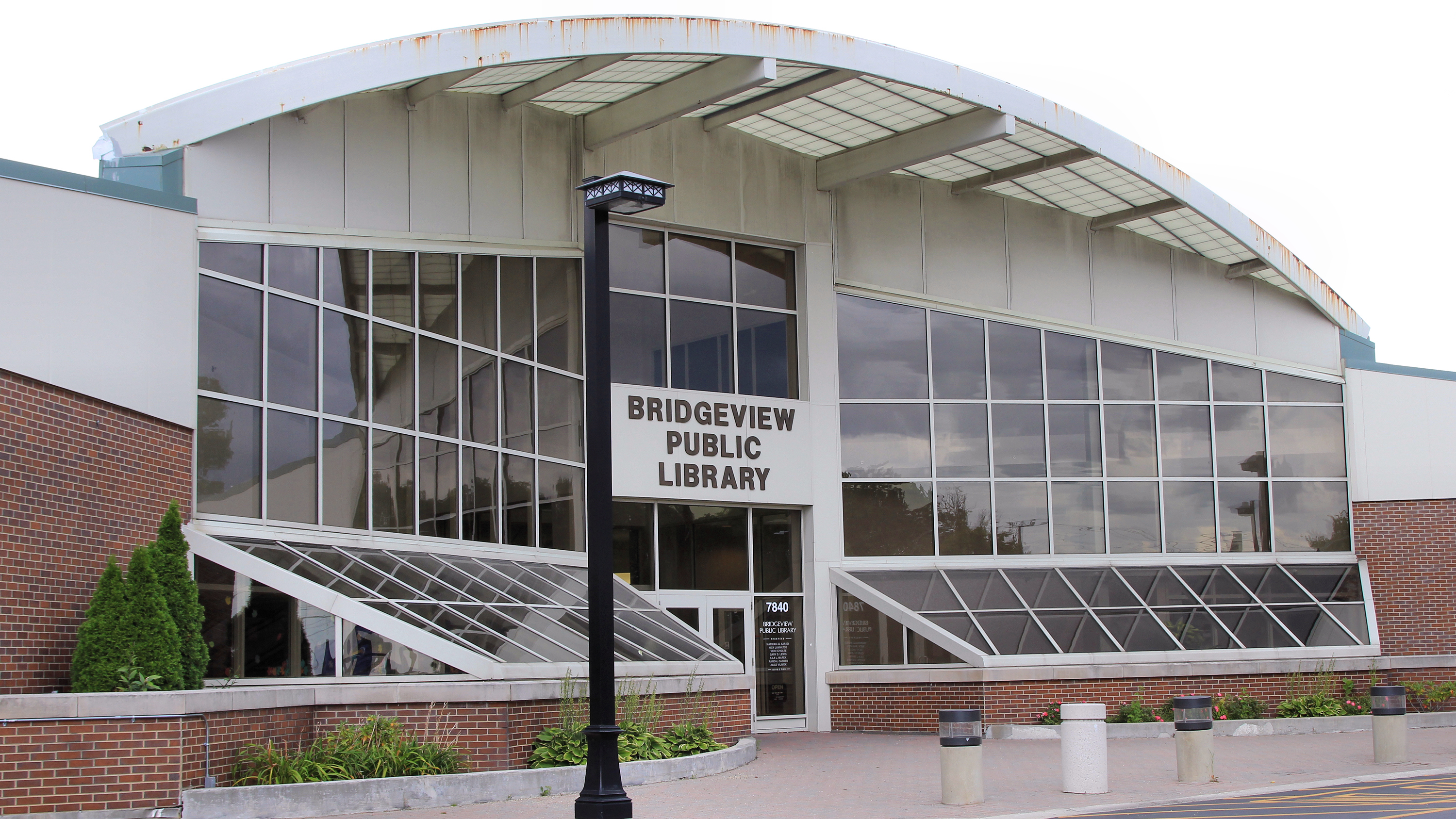
Bridgeview Public Library

Public elementary school districts serving Bridgeview include:

- Indian Springs School District 109
  - Two Indian Springs schools are in the city limits: Bridgeview Elementary School and Lyle Elementary School.
- Cook County School District 104
- North Palos School District 117
  - Residential areas of the North Palos School District section are zoned to Dorn Elementary School, Glen Oaks Elementary School, and Conrady Middle School; all three schools are in Hickory Hills.
- Ridgeland School District 122
  - Residents are zoned to Lieb Elementary in Bridgeview and Simmons Middle School in Oak Lawn.

High school districts:

- Argo Community High School (District 217)
- Oak Lawn Community High School (District 229)
- Consolidated High School District 230
  - Amos Alonzo Stagg High School serves the section of Bridgeview in District 230

Private schools in Bridgeview:

- Aqsa School (Islamic K-12)
- Universal School (Islamic K-12)

K-8 private schools in the surrounding area:

- St. Albert the Great School (Burbank)
- St. Louis DeMontfort School (Oak Lawn)
- St. Patricia School (Hickory Hills)
- Zion Lutheran School (Summit)

Moraine Valley Community College serves area residents.

The Bridgeview Public Library serves residents of the village.

== Transportation ==
Pace provides bus service on multiple routes connecting Bridgeview to destinations across the Southland.

== Notable people ==
- Mark Barnett, a former professional motocross racer.
- Brent Bowers, a former MLB outfielder
- Steven Landek, current mayor of Bridgeview and Illinois State Senator from 2011 to 2023
- Todd Rogers, video game player; former resident
