= Mosque Foundation =

Mosque in Illinois, the United States

Coordinates: 41°43′22.2″N 87°48′10.6″W

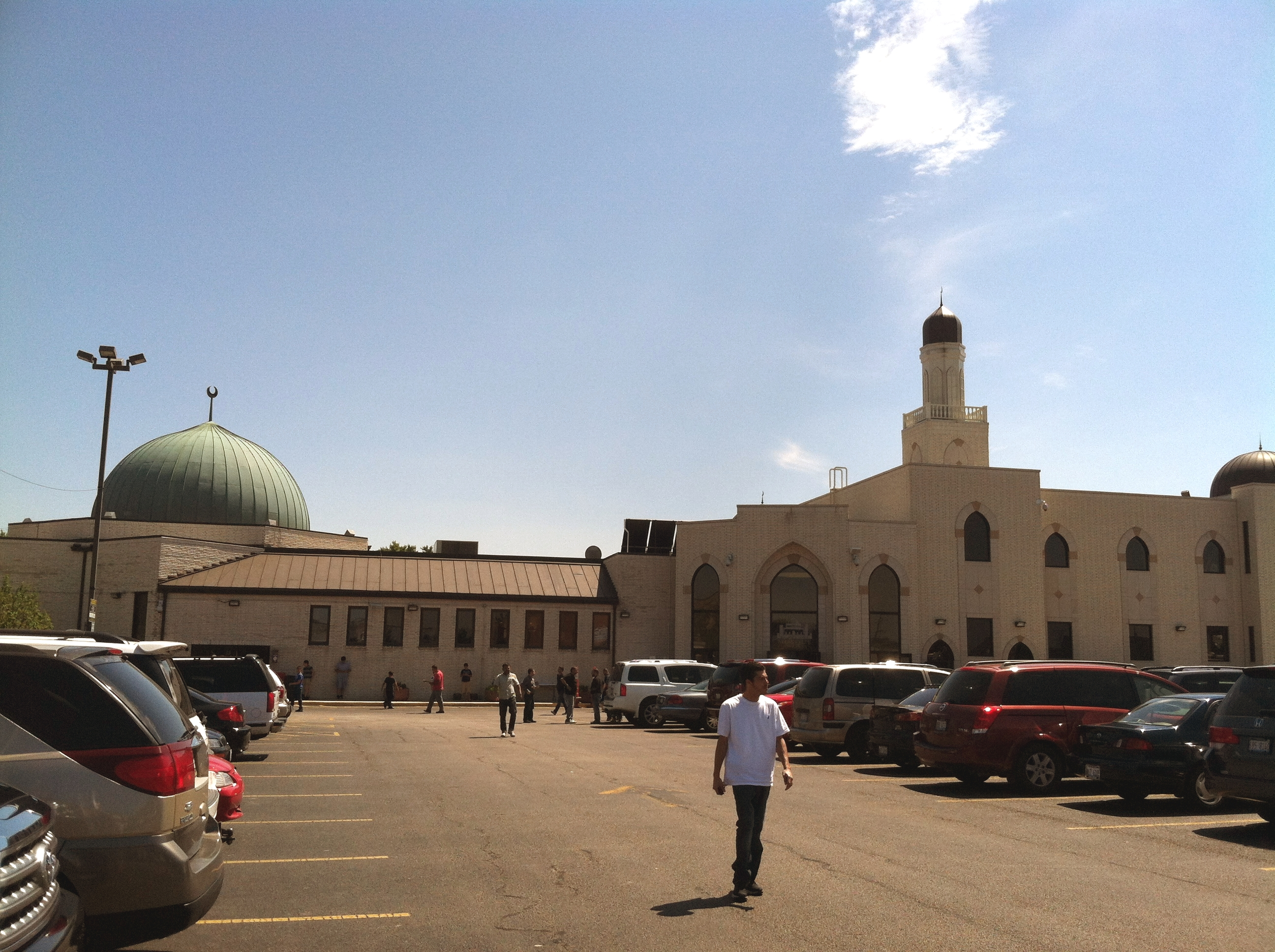

Religion
- Affiliation: Islam
- Ecclesiastical or organisational status: non-profit religious organization
- Leadership: Imam(s): Jamal Said

Location
- Location: 7360 W. 93rd St., Bridgeview, Illinois, United States
- Interactive map of Mosque Foundation

Architecture
- Type: Mosque
- Style: Modern
- Established: 1954

Specifications
- Capacity: 10,000+
- Dome: 3
- Minaret: 1

Website
- Official Website

The Mosque Foundation is located in Bridgeview, Illinois, in the Chicago metropolitan area.

== History ==
In 1954 a handful of Palestinians from Beitunia émigrés on Chicago's famous Southside formed the Mosque Foundation of Chicago with the dream of one day building a structure to house the religious and cultural activities of their growing young families. One of the mosques most notable founders is Suraya Shalabi. The foundation's first prayer leader, Khalil Zayid, was a poor salesman who could neither read nor write in English, but who recognized the need for a place to practice his religion. Unable to drive, Zayid asked his daughter Miriam to take him from door to door to ask for money to build a mosque. Everyone in the early foundation chipped in to help raise funds including the women of the foundation who held bake sales in an effort to raise funds. Today, that dream has become one of the busiest mosques in America, serving a community of more than 50,000 Muslims.

By the 1970s all Zayid and the other Palestinian immigrants could afford was an empty lot in Bridgeview situated between railroad tracks and a trailer park, But the 1970s ushered in a new wave of immigrants who were both political and educated. By appealing to their wealthy charities in Saudi Arabia, on the grounds that their children were in danger of being lost to an “unIslamic society,” the newcomers to Bridgeview were able to raise $1.2 million. Built in 1981 on a few acres of swampy land in the middle of mostly abandoned prairie in Bridgeview, the new mosque was composed of a prayer hall with a capacity of 300 worshippers. No one could foresee that the mosque's establishment would inspire a Muslim neighborhood of hundreds of beautiful new homes around the mosque, two full-time Islamic schools at its edges, a Community Center down the road, and dozens of thriving businesses.

The new mosque leaders removed Zayid from his post and replaced him with Masoud Ali Masoud, a conservative Islamic scholar and member of the Islamic movement. Changes were made in the community whereby women were asked to cover their hair and separated from men as per shariah law. In November, 1981 protests broke out among mosque members and the foundation's decision to turn the deed of the mosque over to the North American Atlantic Trust. Eventually, the dispute was settled in a 1983 Chicago hearing by a judge who deemed that no one had acted unlawfully. The community has steadily diversified to include Muslims of many languages and experiences—all praying side-by-side, with their children, in a brimming mosque that cannot contain them.

By 1985 Sheikh Jamal Said, inspired by the Islamic movement, became the religious leader at the foundation where he now remains. Known for his fiery sermons, and his efforts to help oppressed Muslims, Jamal is a well-respected imam and member of the community. Under Jamal's leadership, the mosque offers a politically conservative version of Islam, though any Muslims regardless of ideology are also allowed to pray and engage at the mosque. Today, imams of the foundation are active in counseling, education, spiritual guidance, and arbitration. Community members work with local and national Islamic, interfaith, and civic organizations on numerous initiatives. These include protecting American civil liberties, empowering Muslims locally and nationally, improving the quality of urban life across America, and helping the poor, immigrants, and the oppressed by advocating for justice and peace.

== Timeline ==
1954: Official Registration

1963: Interim Location Purchased

1976: Tax-exempt Status Approved

1977: Mosque Architectural Plan Completed

1978: Construction Began

1981: Mosque Opened

1986: Aqsa School for Girls Opened in Mosque*

1996: Youth Center Opened

1998: Interim Expansion Completed

2002: Lot for Additional Parking Purchased and Developed

2004: Reopened Youth Center after Major Remodeling

2005: Muslim Community Donated Lakeshore Chicago Garden to the City of Chicago

2005: Food Pantry Opened

2006: Expanded Youth Center to Community Center

2007: Started Mosque Foundation Community Pulse Newsletter

2007: New Website Launched

2008: Second major expansion completed

== See also ==
- List of Mosques in Illinois
- Islam in the United States
- Timeline of Islamic history
- Islamic Architecture
- Islamic Art
- List of mosques in the Americas
- Lists of mosques
- List of mosques in the United States
