= Aqsa School =

Islamic day school in Bridgeview, Illinois, USA

Coordinates: 41.723844°N 87.803158°W

Aqsa School (Arabic: مدرسة الأقصی) is an Islamic day school in Bridgeview, Illinois, in the Chicago metropolitan area. As of 2016 the principal is Tammie Ismail.

The school has elementary, junior high, and high school levels. The elementary is coeducational while the later stages are all-girls'.

Aqsa School is not affiliated with the nearby Universal School.

== History ==
The middle and high school opened in 1986 and the elementary division opened after its standalone school building opened in 1996.

In 2016 Sudanese American teacher Laila El-Amin, who headed the Arabic and religion departments of Aqsa School, received the Golden Apple award.

== Demographics ==
Most students are of Arab heritage, and those of Palestinian heritage are the largest Arab subgroup.

Other Arab-American groups include Egyptian, Jordanian, Lebanese, Libyan, and Syrian backgrounds. There are also students of European origin, including those of Albanian, Italian, and Turkish backgrounds. The school has South Asian-origin students; including those of Bangladeshi, Indian, Kashmiri, and Pakistani origins; and Southeast Asian-origin students, including those from the Philippines. In addition there are African-American and Hispanic and Latino students.

In terms of race most students are designated as White American, as Arab Americans are racially classified as "White".

== Operations ==
The 6th and 9th grades see influxes of students who transfer from other schools.
