= Nazareth Academy (Wakefield, Massachusetts) =

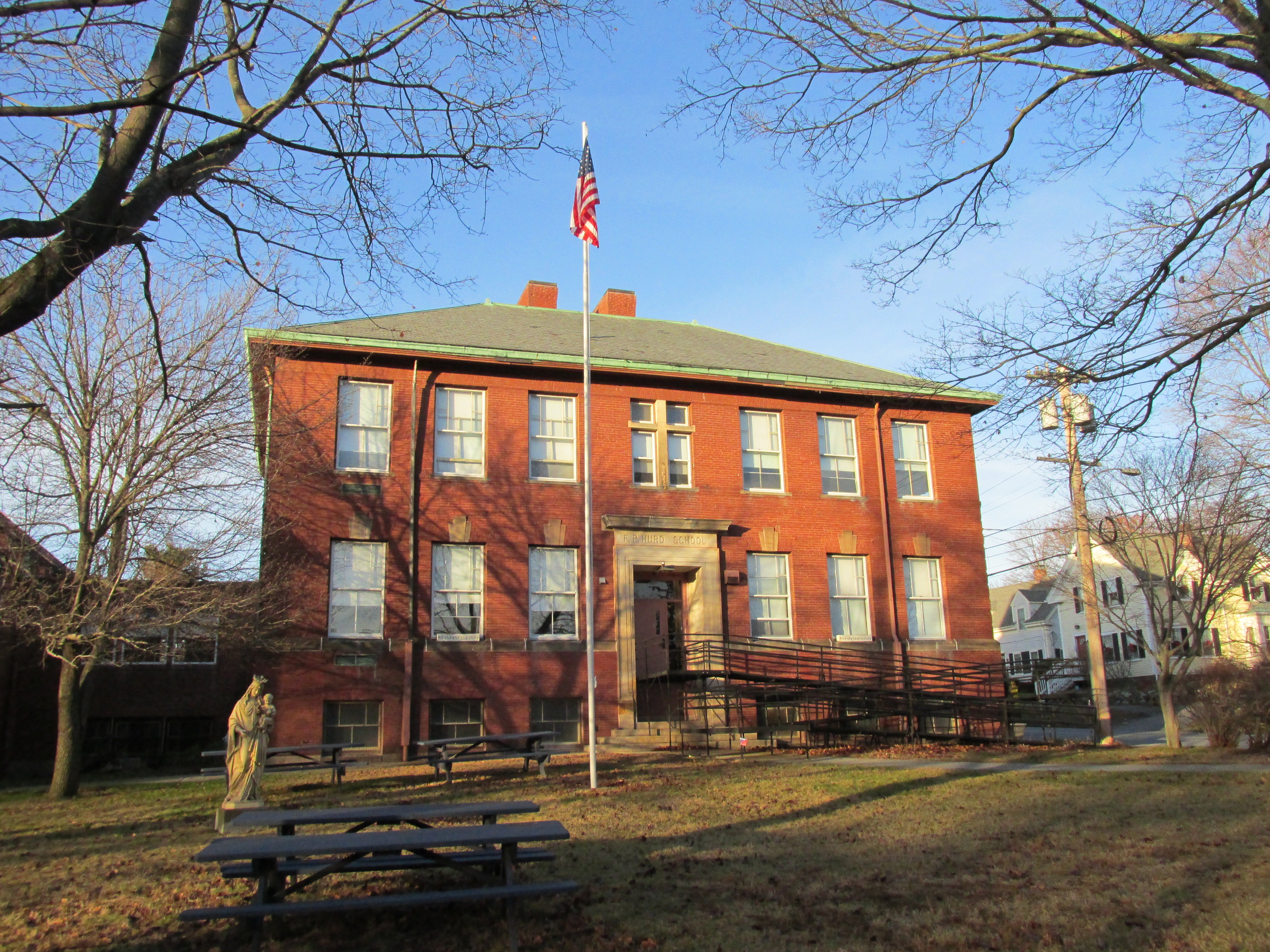
- Nazareth Academy

Location
- 27 Cordis Street; Wakefield, Massachusetts 01880; United States
- 42.5158°N 71.0715°W

Information
- School type: private, secondary
- Motto: Dei sub numine viget (Under God's power, she flourishes)
- Denomination: Roman Catholic
- Founded: 2009
- Closed: 2016
- Principal: Phyllis Morrison
- Grades: 9–12
- Gender: all-girls
- Colors: navy white
- Slogan: An academy of excellence for young women
- Team name: Dragons

Nazareth Academy was an independent all-girls Catholic high school in Wakefield, Massachusetts.

== History ==
This independent school opened its doors on September 9, 2009. On January 29, 2009, the Sisters of Charity of Nazareth announced the decision to close Our Lady of Nazareth Academy in Wakefield, Massachusetts. Shortly after, a group of parents, alumnae, and community business leaders started an organizing effort for a new girls' school, independent of the Sisters of Charity of Nazareth, with performing arts department head Patricia Tamagini as the new head of school.

On April 14, 2009, by unanimous vote of the Wakefield School Committee, the new Nazareth Academy was granted official school status by the Town of Wakefield in the Commonwealth of Massachusetts, indicating approval of the Academy's curriculum and state recognition for its graduates' diplomas.

Nazareth Academy graduated its first class of 17 seniors in May 2010.

In 2016, with a student body of less than 30, it was announced that Nazareth Academy was closing. Girls and their families who were interested in an all-girls educational environment were invited to attend The Academy at Penguin Hall, a new school in Wenham, located in a mansion which had served as a residence for the Sisters of Notre Dame de Namur from 1962 until the mid-1990s. Nazareth Academy graduated its final class of 8 seniors in May 2016.

== Campus ==
Nazareth Academy was housed at the former Hurd school on Cordis Street in Wakefield, near Lake Quannapowitt. The academy was the sole respondent to a request for proposals the town issued in March 2009 to use the vacant building.

== Statistics ==
Year	freshmen	total students	graduated	references
2009–2010			17	
2010–2011	28		26	
2015–2016		25		
