= Mary Balch's School =

All-girls school in Providence, Rhode Island

- 22 George Street, Providence, Rhode Island (Defunct and demolished); United States

Information
- Type: Private school
- Founders: Sarah Balch, Mary Balch
- Gender: Girls
- Enrollment: 113 (1821)

Mary Balch's School, also known as the Polly Balch School or just the Balch School, was an 18th-century private, all-girls school in Providence, Rhode Island. It is most known for its students' style of needlepoint samplers. The school was started together by mother and daughter, Sarah and Mary Balch.

== Mary Balch ==
Mary "Polly" Balch was born in Newport, Rhode Island, in 1762. She was the second child of Timothy Balch, a tailor, and Sarah Rogers Balch. At the start of the British occupation of Newport in 1776 during the American Revolution, Balch and her family moved from Newport to Providence, Rhode Island. Within a year, her father died, leaving her mother with four children. Balch likely began teaching in 1782 to help support the family.

== History ==
Sometime before 1785, Mary and Sarah Balch opened a school together in Providence using their knowledge on needlepoint samplers from their hometown of Newport. The earliest sampler traced back to the school is dated from March, 1785. Eventually, Mary Balch took over operation of the school from her mother.

On August 10, 1801, Mary Balch expanded the school by opening a boarding school on George Street. The new curriculum included subjects outside of needlework, included writing, music, and dancing. In 1821, 113 students were enrolled, making the Balch School the highest-attended private school in Providence.

Mary Balch continued to work at the school until her death. She died on January 3, 1831, at the age 69. Her tombstone states that she was the "1st to establish a female Academy in Providence." After her death, the school was run by one of Balch's previous assistants, Miss Walker.

== Style of embroidery work ==
Sometimes considered "playful", the Balch style of embroidery often included figures in elegant clothes and naturalistic florals in borders or on arches. Betty Ring named the Balch's style of work the "frolicking people" style, which can be contrasted with the more formal English style used by other instructors from Newport around the same time. One common motif from the school is a depiction of a pseudo-classical arch along with multiple figures.

Many of the samplers included a public building as a focal point. This style of using real buildings as a focal point in samplers was thought to have originated at the school. Balch's students depicted buildings in Providence, including churches and statehouses.

One of the most popular sayings included in the school's works was "Let Virtue be a Guide to thee." Mourning embroideries done on silk were also completed at the school. A feature of Balch's style of mourning embroideries included using stitching instead of ink for the details on memorial monuments.

== Legacy ==
The original school building is now demolished.

Samplers created at the school were the first in the United States to be recognized as having a distinctive embroidery style coming from a specific school. Balch herself became one of the most well-known teachers of needlework from the 18th century. According to Joseph K. Ott, in modern times, the Balch School "produced the highest number of embroideries that can be attributed to a single source."

Samplers from the school have been sold for over $100,000 at auctions. In 1987, a sampler from the Balch School was sold for $192,500; the sampler was created by 11-year-old Eliza Waterman in 1788.
