= Ridgeland School District 122 =

School district in Illinois, United States

Address
- 6500 West 95th Street Oak Lawn, Illinois, 60453; United States

District information
- Type: Public
- Grades: PreK–8
- NCES District ID: 1733690

Students and staff
- Students: 2,341

Other information
- Website: www.ridgeland122.com

Ridgeland School District 122 is a school district headquartered in Oak Lawn, Illinois in the Chicago metropolitan area.

It serves sections of Oak Lawn and Bridgeview.

== Schools ==
- Simmons Middle School (Oak Lawn)
- Elementary schools:
  - Columbus Manor Elementary School (Oak Lawn)
  - Harnew Elementary School (Oak Lawn)
  - Kolb Elementary School (Oak Lawn)
  - Lieb Elementary School (Bridgeview)
