= Queen of Angels Academy (Compton, California) =

Location
- 823 East Compton Boulevard; Compton, California 90220; United States; 33.8956°N 118.2619°W

Information
- Type: Private, All-Female
- Religious affiliation: Roman Catholic
- Founded: 1995
- Status: defunct
- Closed: 2002
- Authority: Roman Catholic Archdiocese of Los Angeles
- Grades: 9-12
- Affiliation: Sisters of the Holy Family

Queen of Angels Academy was a private Catholic high school for girls in Compton, California.

== History ==
It was established in 1995 through the merger of two all-girl schools, St. Michael's High School in Los Angeles, and Regina Caeli High School.

The academy occupied the campus of the former Regina Caeli High School, a school with a 99% minority student body, administered by the Sisters of the Holy Family, a congregation of African-American religious sisters.

In December 2001 the Archdiocese of Los Angeles announced that the academy would close at the end of the current school year, citing declining enrollment and the high level of subsidy by the archdiocese as major factors.

The following year, the building was converted for use as St. Albert the Great Middle School, part of the parochial school located across the street.
