= Loisian Seminary =

Coordinates: 40°41′51″N 73°59′18″W

Loisian Seminary was a girls' school in the U.S. state of New York. Founded in 1813, it was the first public school in Brooklyn.

Up to the year 1813, there was no public and few private schools in Brooklyn. In that year, however, an enterprise originated which ultimately resulted in the establishment of the first public school. A number of charitable women of the city formed an organization and established a school known as the Loisian Seminary, named after Lois, the grandmother of Timothy the Apostle, and by whom he was instructed in the first principles of the Christian religion.

The object of this organization was for the purpose of teaching poor children reading, writing, arithmetic, knitting, and sewing, at no cost. Twenty-four students were selected, who attended in rotation.

The school was run by five trustees, namely, Mrs. Ann Ayscough Sands, Mrs. Onderdonk, Mrs. Ireland, Mrs. Miller, Mrs. Moffat, and Miss Cunningham, secretary. Sands, whose name headed the subscribers, was the wife of Joshua Sands, who had been collector of the Port of New York and member of Congress. The trustees' duty was to attend at least once each week. They were assisted by two other women. They provided paper, books, and other materials as required. The trustees decided which children were to be admitted. Money for the rent of the room and providing books was raised by subscriptions and donations. The trustees saw to it that the children admitted in this school attended religious service in the churches to which they belonged. The trustees fixed the hours for keeping school open, and developed the regulations to run it. The students were selected by the trustees, and any one neglecting to attend without sufficient excuse was required to pay a fine of US$1.

After moving around to different sites, a permanent location for the school was obtained at the southeast corner of Adams and Concord streets, which later became the site of District School No. 1.

== Bibliography ==
- Bishop, William G.; McCloskey, Henry (1863). Manual of the Common Council of the City of Brooklyn for ... (Public domain ed.). Brooklyn (New York, N.Y.). Common Council.
