= Mount Alvernia High School =

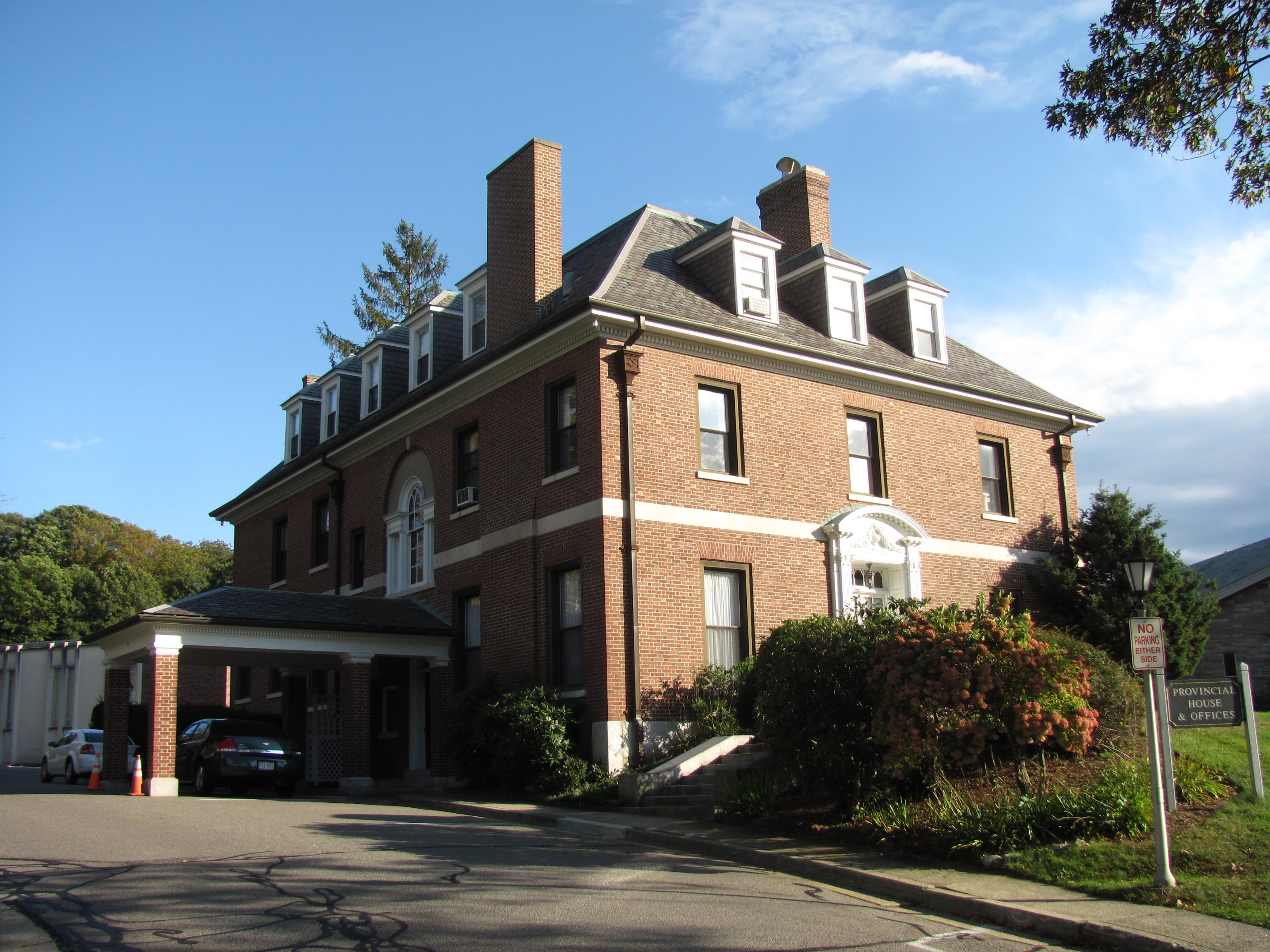
- Provincial House

Location
- 790 Centre Street; Newton, (Middlesex County), Massachusetts 02458; United States; 42°20′39″N 71°11′19″W

Information
- Type: Private, All-Girls
- Religious affiliation: Roman Catholic
- Denomination: Franciscan
- Established: 1935
- Status: Closed
- Closed: 2023
- Head of school: Jillian Boudreau
- Grades: 7–12
- Average class size: 30
- Colors: Navy Blue and Gold
- Slogan: Pax et Bonum
- Athletics conference: Catholic Conference
- Mascot: Mustang
- Team name: Mustangs
- Accreditation: New England Association of Schools and Colleges
- Tuition: 20,000
- Director of Admissions: Kimberly Kossuth
- Athletic Director: Julie Gosselin

Mount Alvernia High School (MAHS) was a private all-girls Roman Catholic high school in Newton, Massachusetts. The school is part of the Roman Catholic Archdiocese of Boston.

On March 8, 2023, it was announced that the high school would be closing at the end of the 2022-2023 school year.

== Background ==
Mount Alvernia High School was established in 1935 as an extension of Mount Alvernia Academy, an elementary school established in 1927 located in nearby Chestnut Hill. In 1972, the high school became a separate entity when it moved to 790 Centre St. in Newton, Massachusetts. The school's curriculum is college-preparatory and every student that attends graduates with at least one college acceptance.

The school had approximately 133 students, and its campus covers around 23 acres. The average class size was 15 students, with an overall teacher-to-student ratio of 1 to 9. There were numerous varsity sports teams, including cross country, soccer, swimming, volleyball, basketball, ice hockey, indoor track and field, golf, outdoor track and field, softball, lacrosse, and tennis.

The owners of the land sold to Boston College in 2023. The school shuttered after the 2022-2023 school year.
