= Academy of St. Aloysius =

Defunct Catholic high school in Jersey City, New Jersey, United States

Location
- 2495 Kennedy Boulevard; Jersey City, Hudson County, New Jersey 07304; United States
- 40.726446°N 74.075146°W

Information
- Type: Private, All-female
- Religious affiliation: Roman Catholic
- Closed: 2006
- Grades: 9-12

The Academy of St. Aloysius was a private high school for girls located in Jersey City, in Hudson County, New Jersey, United States, operated by the Sisters of Charity of St. Elizabeth. The school had an enrollment of 178 students and offered a college preparatory curriculum, an honors program and college credit courses.

The school closed in June 2006, as did the Academy of the Sacred Heart in Hoboken, New Jersey, another Sisters of Charity girls' high school, as they merged to form a new school, called Caritas Academy. Also run by the Sisters of Charity, was open from September 2006 until 2008 in the building previously occupied by St. Aloysius.

The school was a member of the New Jersey Association of Independent Schools.

== Athletics ==
The Academy of St. Aloysius competes in the Hudson County Interscholastic Athletic Association (HCIAA), which includes 22 private and parochial high schools in Hudson County. The league operates under the supervision of the New Jersey State Interscholastic Athletic Association (NJSIAA).

== Notable alumnae ==
- Katherine Whelan Brown (1872–1942), politician who was the first woman elected to the New Jersey State Legislature.
