= Our Lady of Nazareth Academy (Wakefield, Massachusetts) =

Location
- 14 Winship Drive; Wakefield, (Middlesex County), Massachusetts 01880; United States; 42°29′50″N 71°5′15″W

Information
- Type: Private, All-Girls
- Motto: Caritas Christi Urget Nos. (The love of Christ urges us on.)
- Religious affiliation: Roman Catholic
- Established: 1947
- Founder: Sisters of Charity of Nazareth
- Closed: 2009
- Grades: 9–12
- Average class size: 21
- Student to teacher ratio: 8:1
- Campus: Suburban
- Campus size: 20 acres (81,000 m^{2})
- Colors: Navy Blue and White
- Athletics conference: Catholic Conference - G
- Team name: Dragons
- Accreditation: New England Association of Schools and Colleges
- Publication: The Nazorean (literary magazine)

Our Lady of Nazareth Academy was a private, all-girls, Roman Catholic high school in Wakefield, Massachusetts. It was located in the Roman Catholic Archdiocese of Boston and operated from 1947 to 2009.

== Background ==
Our Lady of Nazareth Academy was established in 1947 by the Sisters of Charity of Nazareth.

== Extracurricular activities ==
Athletic programs included volleyball, soccer, basketball, softball, and tennis. Students performed in dramas such as Shakespeare's Hamlet and musicals such as Sweethearts. Several times drama students participated in the Massachusetts High School Drama Guild One-Act Festival.

Other extracurricular activities included Concert Choir, Student Council, Student Newspaper, Math Team, Environmental Club, Mock Trial, Hope Club, Model U.N and Diversity Club.

== Closure ==
The Sisters of Charity of Nazareth closed the school at the end of the 2009 academic year.
