= Academy of the Sacred Heart (New Jersey) =

Coordinates: 40°44′43″N 74°01′42″W

Academy of the Sacred Heart was a Catholic school in Hoboken, New Jersey. Before its closure it was a high school for girls; it had circa 160 students in 2003.

It was established as a coeducational day school, with a ten-slot boarding facility for students resident in New York State, in 1868. It at first had a frame building but later it occupied 713 Washington, where it remained for the remainder of its life. Its building later had an expansion.

In 2006 it merged with Academy of St. Aloysius to form Caritas Academy, with St. Aloysius hosting the merged school, which closed in 2008.

In 2010 Hoboken Charter School moved its K-8 students into the former academy building.
