= St. Elizabeth Academy =

Closed high school in St. Louis, Missouri, US

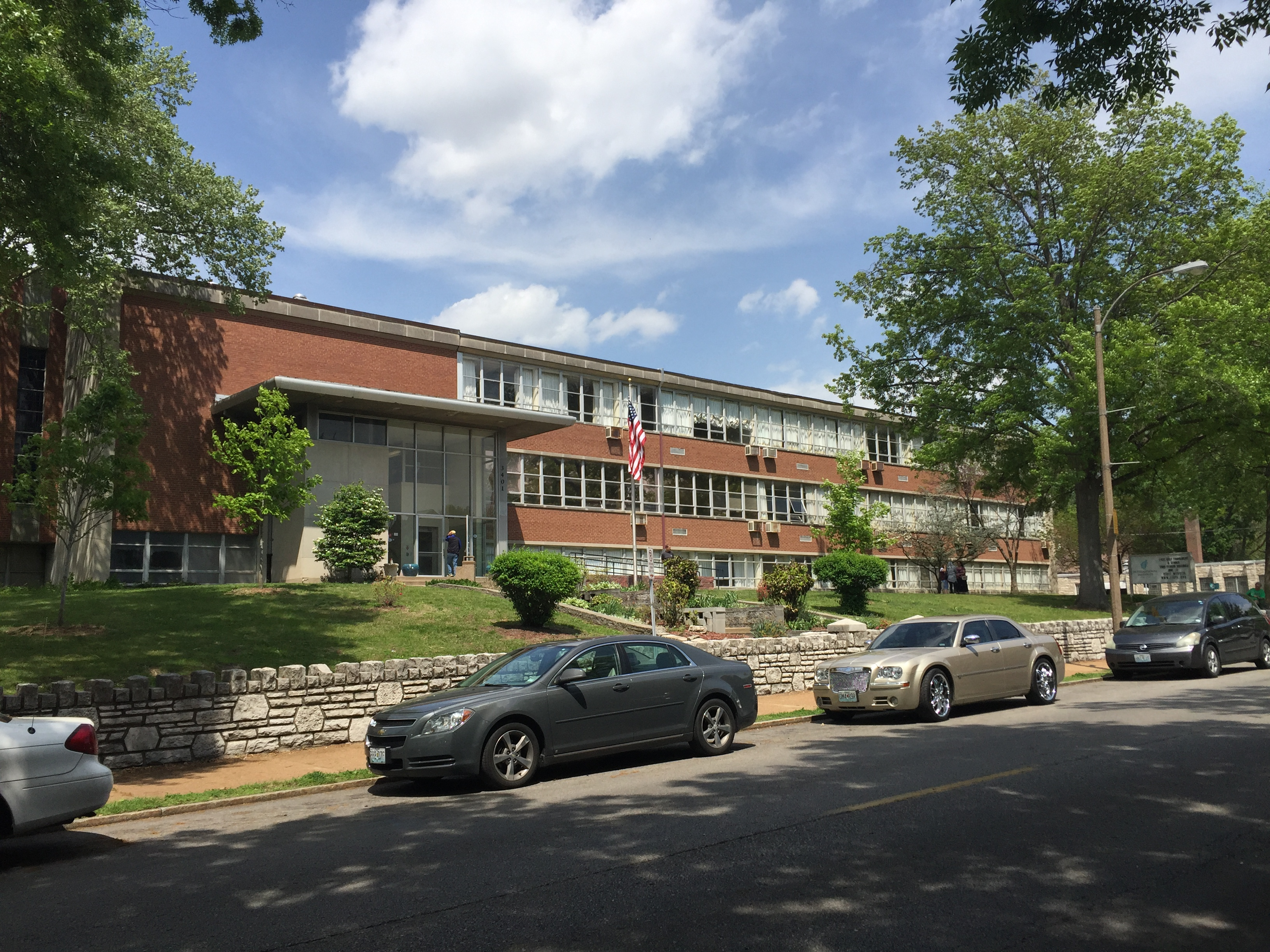
- International Institute of St. Louis in May 2018. The building was formerly St. Elizabeth Academy.

Location
- 3401 Arsenal Street; St. Louis, Missouri 63118; United States; 38.602475°N 90.238314°W

Information
- Type: Private all-girls high school
- Religious affiliation: Roman Catholic
- Established: 1882
- Closed: 2013
- Staff: 34 (4 full, 30 part)
- Grades: 9–12
- Colors: Red and white
- Slogan: "Developing the Successful Woman Inside Each Girl"
- Mascot: Lizzie the Hawk
- Nickname: Hawks
- Accreditation: NCACS
- Newspaper: Thuringian
- Tuition: $8,900 (2012–13)
- Website: seahs.org (archived)

St. Elizabeth Academy (SEA) was a private, Roman Catholic high school in the Tower Grove East neighborhood of St. Louis, Missouri. Established in 1882 by the Sisters of the Most Precious Blood of O'Fallon, it operated as an all-girls school until its closure in 2013.

== History ==
The Sisters of the Most Precious Blood established SEA as a boarding school for girls in 1882. It later transitioned into a day school.

=== Closure in 2013 ===
The Board of Directors announced on January 8, 2013 it would close the school due to declining enrollment rates. A closing Mass and celebration were held on July 21, 2013. At the time of its closure, St. Elizabeth was the second-oldest Catholic operating in the city of St. Louis behind St. Louis University High School.

The school's campus and convent were sold to the International Institute of St. Louis, an organization dedicated to assisting new immigrants to the United States.

== Campus ==
The original building of St. Elizabeth Academy's campus was constructed in 1894 in a High Victorian Gothic style.

The campus of SEA was added to the National Register of Historic Places in 1983 as part of the Crittenden Historic District.
