= LaSalle Elementary School District 122 =

Public school district in LaSalle, Illinois, United States

LaSalle Public Schools District 122

Address
- 1165 St. Vincents Avenue LaSalle, Illinois, 61301; United States
- Coordinates: 41.3400°N 89.0963°W

District information
- Type: Public
- Grades: PreK-8
- Established: 1947
- Superintendent: Mr. Brian Debarnardi

Students and staff
- Students: 904 (total), 599 (Northwest), 253 (Lincoln), 48 (Jackson)

Other information
- Website: Official website

LaSalle Elementary School District 122 is a public school district located in LaSalle, Illinois.

== Schools ==
- AS# School
- Northwest Elementary School
- Lincoln Jr. High School
