= Caritas Academy =

Former Catholic girls school in New Jersey

- Jersey City, New Jersey

Information
- Type: Private, All-Female
- Religious affiliation: Catholic Church
- Established: 2006
- Closed: 2008
- Grades: 9-12

Caritas Academy was an all-girls Catholic high school in Jersey City, New Jersey. It operated under the auspices of the Archdiocese of Newark.

== History ==
Caritas Academy was a four-year Catholic college preparatory for urban young women, sponsored and operated by the Sisters of Charity of Saint Elizabeth, and currently serves the academic needs of 210 students.

It was established as a merger of Academy of Saint Aloysius in Jersey City and the Academy of the Sacred Heart in Hoboken, opening in 2006 in the former Aloysius building.

The academy had been accredited by the Middle States Association of Colleges and Secondary Schools since 1954. It was a member of the National Association for College Admission Counseling, The College Board, National Association of Independent Schools, New Jersey Student Success, and the Archdiocese of Newark. Caritas accommodates schedules with New Jersey City University for the School of Visual and Performing Arts, and has affiliations with Saint Peter's College and the College of Saint Elizabeth to grant college credits.

It had 185 students in 2007.

Caritas Academy closed down on June 30, 2008. The building now belongs to Learning Community Charter School.
