= Woodward School for Girls =

Independent girls' school in Massachusetts

The Woodward School
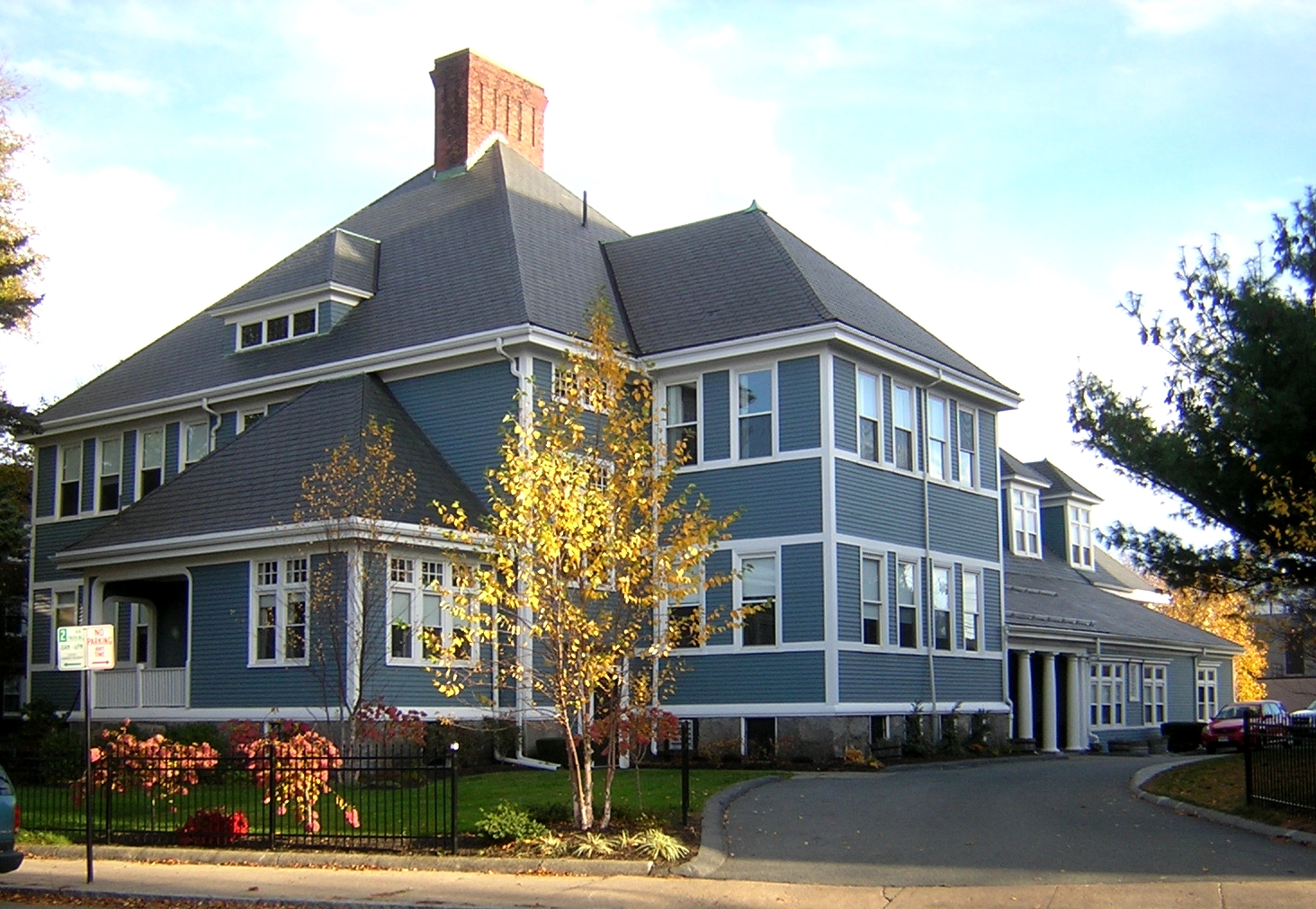

Location
- 1102 Hancock Street; Quincy, MA 02169; United States

Information
- Former names: Woodward Institute for Girls, Woodward Female Institute, Woodward School for Girls
- Type: Private school
- Motto: Discimus ut Ducamus (We Learn So That We May Lead)
- Opened: 1894
- Founder: Dr. Ebenezer Woodward & Mary A.W. Greenleaf Woodward
- CEEB code: 221810
- NCES School ID: 00604829
- Head of school: Alex Magay
- Grades: 6-12
- Gender: Female
- Campus: Urban
- Colors: Maroon and White
- Athletics: Soccer, Basketball, Softball, Volleyball
- Athletics conference: New England Preparatory School Athletic Council (NEPSAC)
- Mascot: Wildcat
- Accreditation: New England Association of Schools and Colleges (NEASC)
- Newspaper: The Columns
- Affiliation: International Coalition of Girls' Schools (ICGS)
- Website: thewoodwardschool.org

- Woodward Institute
- U.S. National Register of Historic Places
- Location within Massachusetts Location within the United States
- Location: 1102 Hancock Street, Quincy, Massachusetts 02169
- Coordinates: 42°15′18″N 71°0′20.7″W
- Area: 1.4 acres (0.57 ha)
- Built: 1893
- Built by: Loxon, S.
- Architect: Thayer, E.G., Kendall & Stevens, Rand & Taylor
- Architectural style: Queen Anne
- MPS: Quincy MRA
- NRHP reference No.: 89001954
- Added to NRHP: November 13, 1989

The Woodward School is an independent, college-preparatory day school for girls in grades six through twelve. Founded by bequest in 1869 and opened in 1894, the school is located in the historic Quincy Center district of Quincy, Massachusetts, and is the only nonsectarian private school in the city. Woodward's American Queen Anne style school building is listed on the National Register of Historic Places.

== History of the School ==
=== Founding ===
The Woodward School was founded by Dr. Ebenezer Woodward and his wife, Mary Ann Wroe Greenleaf. Dr. Woodward was a prominent Quincy physician and a cousin of President John Adams. When Dr. Woodward died in 1869, his will established a trust fund to create and maintain a girls' school equivalent to the Adams Academy, the Quincy boys' school founded by John Adams.

Upon her death in 1870, Mary A.W. Greenleaf Woodward bequeathed further assets to the trust fund established by her late husband. The Town of Quincy, which became a city in 1888, was named trustee of "The Woodward Fund and Property," and was given 25 years to build the school.

=== Historic School Building ===
The original school building consisted of six classrooms and was designed by E. G. Thayer in the Queen Anne style, with clapboard siding and a slate roof. Construction began in 1893 and was completed in 1894. In 1897, the school building was modified to add six additional classrooms, a library, study hall, gymnasium, reception rooms, and administrative offices. The architectural firms of Kendall & Stevens and Rand & Taylor were contracted to design plans for this significant structural extension. Upon completion of construction, the size of the school building was roughly doubled in size. Today, the school largely retains visual conformance with the 1897 building.

In 1989, the Woodward School was added to the National Register of Historic Places as an individual property of national architectural, educational, cultural, and historic significance.

== Affiliated organizations ==
- National Association of Independent Schools
- International Coalition of Girls' Schools
- New England Association of Schools and Colleges
- New England Preparatory School Athletic Council
- Adams Academy (1872-1908)
- Adams Temple and School Fund

== See also ==
- National Register of Historic Places listings in Quincy, Massachusetts
- Women's education in the United States
- Timeline of women's education
- List of girls' schools in the United States
