= I Raise My Eyes to Say Yes =

1989 memoir by Ruth Sienkiewicz-Mercer and Steven B. Kaplan

I Raise My Eyes to Say Yes: A Memoir
- First edition
- Author: Ruth Sienkiewicz-Mercer; Steven B. Kaplan
- Language: English
- Publisher: Houghton Mifflin Harcourt (first edition); Whole Health Books (revised edition)
- Publication date: August 17, 1989
- Pages: 225
- ISBN: 978-0-395-46109-9
- Website: iraisemyeyes.com

I Raise My Eyes to Say Yes: A Memoir is a 1989 autobiography by former Belchertown State School resident Ruth Sienkiewicz-Mercer coauthored with Steven B. Kaplan. Cognitively normal but severely limited physically by cerebral palsy and quadriplegia, Sienkiwicz-Mercer recounts the abuse she faced at the institution, whose staff presumed for years she was mentally handicapped, as well as her happy childhood before Belchertown and life after moving out therefrom.

Due to the family's shortage of financial resources, and her father's belief that institutionalizing her is in her family's best interest, Sienkiewicz-Mercer is admitted to Belchertown State School in May 1962. At Belchertown, she is diapered in some fashion for ten years despite being toilet trained, wears a hospital johnny for approximately four years, and is force fed. The institution is chronically understaffed, though conditions, such as the quality of food and staffing levels, gradually improve the longer she is there. Sienkiwicz-Mercer remains at Belchertown for sixteen years before moving into an apartment in her community, and later marries a former patient.

She authored the book with assistance from Steven B. Kaplan through word boards, using sounds, facial expressions, and a series of "yes or no" answers to communicate. Kaplan wrote most of the words of the book, though the emotions, thoughts, and impressions expressed were those of Sienkiewicz-Mercer. I Raise My Eyes to Say Yes received positive reviews upon release, and won a 1990 Christopher Award.

== Author and background ==
Ruth Sienkiewicz-Mercer (1950–1998) was an American quadriplegic and disability rights activist. She lived in a variety of places as a handicapped woman, including at home with her parents, at a private facility, and later at Belchertown State School. Sienkiewicz-Mercer began working on the book in 1976. After creating an outline of the book and "several pages of roughly drawn anecdotes" while at Belchertown, she met coauthor Steven B. Kaplan in January 1979 through the FREE (Fundamental Right to Equal Education) program, which assigned Kaplan to help Sienkiewicz-Mercer complete her autobiography.

She communicated to him by word boards through a variety of sounds and facial expressions, including raised eyes to indicate yes and a curled frown to indicate no. Kaplan wrote most of the words of the book, though the emotions, thoughts, and impressions expressed were those of Sienkiewicz-Mercer, who reviewed several drafts of his documentations. Kaplan included words or phrases she created using her word boards, such as "SHARI.DOL.GRETL.SOAP." to describe a story about her sister, in headers or text where possible.

While Kaplan transcribed her thoughts, he independently verified details of her story, including anecdotes and dates. On her wishes in 1986, an attendant of Sienkiewicz-Mercer gave the manuscript to Houghton Mifflin Harcourt book editor Richard Todd at a writer's conference. Todd "couldn't put the manuscript down" once he started reading it. She and Kaplan completed the book in 1988, which took almost two thousand hours of work between the two to finish.

Houghton Mifflin Harcourt published the first edition in 1989, with a 1996 revised edition published by Whole Health Books. In 1983, Sienkiewicz-Mercer described the book's publication as important because it could provide her and her husband with money independent of their Supplemental Security Income. Kaplan, by August 1989 an attorney in Hartford, Connecticut, hoped the release of the book would put Sienkiewicz-Mercer "right where she belongs — as an authority on the treatment of the disabled", while she hoped doctors would acquire knowledge from the memoir, and that she could do peer counseling with handicapped individuals therethrough.

== Synopsis ==
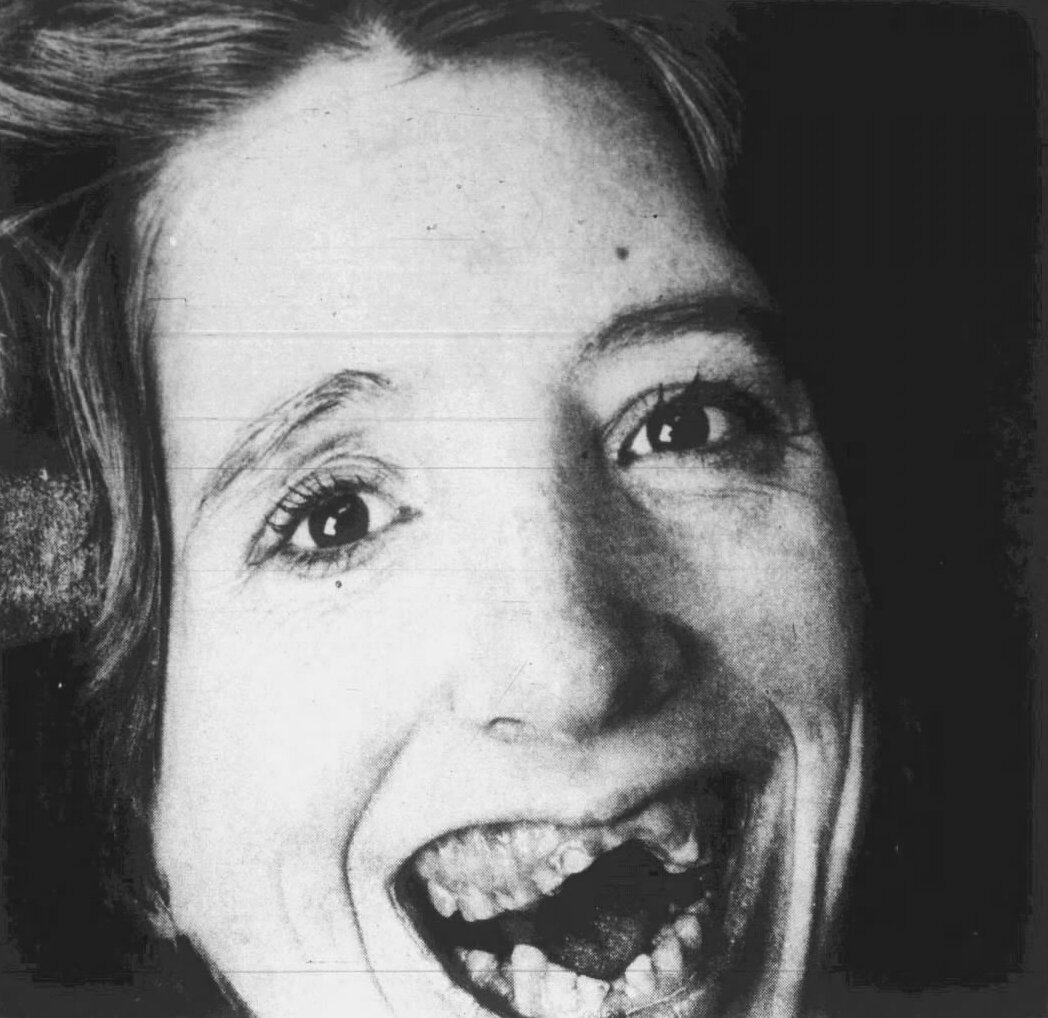
Ruth Sienkiewicz-Mercer (pictured in 1983) spent a total of sixteen years at Belchertown.

Note: synopsis based on Whole Health Books revised edition

I Raise My Eyes to Say Yes recounts the life of former Belchertown State School resident Ruth Sienkiewicz-Mercer, including her happy childhood before she attended the institution, the abuse she faced thereat, and her life after moving out therefrom. Ruth Christine Sienkiewicz-Mercer was born on September 23, 1950, at Cooley Dickinson Hospital in Northampton, Massachusetts, as a healthy baby. At five weeks old, she suffers from encephalitis, which leads to cerebral palsy. Sienkiewicz-Mercer and her mother begin speech and physical therapy at home.

At Lakeville Hospital due to a lack of progress in therapy, she is diagnosed as an imbecile by a psychologist despite being cognitively normal. She remains there for two months before returning home. Her family then sends her to Crotched Mountain Rehabilitation Center in Greenfield, New Hampshire, where staff treat the patients with dignity and respect. She stays there for three and a half years until March 1960. Due to the family's shortage of financial resources, and her father's belief that institutionalizing her is in her family's best interest, Sienkiewicz-Mercer is admitted to Belchertown State School, with her first day on May 14, 1962. A requirement for attendance thereat was a licensed psychologist's certification that the applicant was mentally handicapped.

At Belchertown, a doctor again misdiagnoses her as an imbecile. In the infirmary, nurses force feed her a steamed meat or boiled vegetable pulp devoid of taste while she lies on her back. She is diapered (and would remain diapered in some fashion until early 1972) despite being toilet trained and wears a johnny in the infirmary until spring 1966. Sienkiewicz-Mercer describes the odor on Ward 1 as "sickening", the air "stale", and the atmosphere "lifeless". The institution is chronically understaffed, with, for example, three staff responsible for bathing, feeding, and diapering the thirty residents on Ward 4. Time moves slowly, and she becomes depressed.

After a staff member leaves on whom she has a crush, other staff she likes leave, and the newness of the children's ward on which she lives wears off, Sienkiewicz-Mercer loses a quarter of her total body weight, eleven pounds. New staff on the ward arrive in fall 1965, which "effectively put a stop to the turnstyle-like arrival and departure of [their] attendants". Wessie, one of the new staff members, feeds her by propping her up with pillows instead of flat on her back. Wessie and Alice, another new staff member, learn Sienkiewicz-Mercer is not severely mentally handicapped as previously thought, and Wessie learns her facial expressions used for communication.

Around spring 1966, a new nurse states to the ward supervisor that Sienkiewicz-Mercer should be given a special diet and more time to eat; consequently, she regains weight, and continues a course of physical therapy into 1967. On Friday, April 14, 1967, an attendant breaks Sienkiewicz-Mercer's right leg by accident as she tries to put her in a chair bed. She has to wait three days before being "rushed" for emergency treatment due to the infirmary doctor and X-ray technicians taking off early for the weekend. Though the doctors met with her on Sunday, they waited for an X-ray on Monday to ensure the leg broke.

From 1967 to 1968, and again in 1970, the number of staff in the infirmary slightly increase, which makes almost enough staff to attend to the residents' physical needs, and the food increases in quality. In spring 1971, Sienkiewicz-Mercer uses a communication board for the first time. Due to a lawsuit by the Friends of Belchertown, she and her whole ward leave the infirmary in May 1975 for a different building on the campus.

In March 1978, she advocates on behalf of the physically handicapped in a presentation to about fifty women at the University of Massachusetts campus center. Sienkiewicz-Mercer leaves the state school for good on June 30, 1978, and moves into an apartment with a roommate. She forgives her father for sending her to (and keeping her at) Belchertown, and around May 1980 agrees to marry Norman Mercer, a former patient of the institution. With Norman, she enjoys an "active and fulfilling sexual relationship". At their wedding, Sienkiewicz-Mercer raises her eyes to say yes.

== Reception ==
I Raise My Eyes to Say Yes received positive reviews upon release, with reviewers calling the book remarkable, moving, or extraordinary. Sue Scheible of The Patriot Ledger said the book will alter perceptions of handicaps, while Ronni Scheier of The New York Times Book Review said those with disabilities who live in silence may find a voice in the book. V. L. Stonehouse of The Grand Rapids Press praised Sienkiewicz-Mercer's honest descriptions of her romantic life as a handicapped person, and concluded "Ruth makes a wonderful contribution as an advocate for human rights and dignity through equal education for all". In The Valley Advocate, Josie Rawson categorized the book as an exposé, both of her regrettably ordinary treatment at Belchertown and of an educational system which routinely reduces those with handicaps to non-human levels.

Critics noted the sad but uplifting quality of the book. Kirkus Reviews called the book exactly that, melancholy and inspirational; similarly, Beryl Lieff Benderly of The Washington Post described the book as far sadder than The Good Soldier by Ford Madox Ford, who described his book as the most desolate story he had ever heard. In the Salisbury Post, Jane Eagle Lunsford called I Raise My Eyes to Say Yes agonizing but inspiring. Herbert Mitgang of The New York Times, though, notes the autobiography is narrated with hardly any bitterness, a sentiment echoed by Scheible. Beverly Slapin in the San Francisco Chronicle stated it was astounding that she was able to maintain her sanity, wit, and sense of humor throughout.

Belchertown's cruelty and ignorance was noted by critics, including Mitgang, Rawson, and Susan Craighead of the Courier Journal, who described the institution as an American gulag. Slapin, Stonehouse, and Scheible called her stay thereat either incarceration or imprisonment. Benderly named Belchertown a grisly showing that would test Dickens's descriptive ability, a comparison repeated by Ruth Fischer in The Plain Dealer. In Newsday, Diane Cole called Sienkiewicz-Mercer's recollections a recent version of a macabre Victorian tale.

C. Rodney James of Worklife magazine said the book went beyond a survival tale, and that the author proved those with disabilities are still fully developed individuals with the ability to help greater society if provided a chance. Kirkus described Sienkiewicz-Mercer's recording of institutional life as "similar to other accounts– shortages of time, money, supplies, staff, and a vacuum where compassion should have been", though her will to communicate sets hers apart.

The autobiography received additional reviews in Parade and People magazines.

== Analysis ==
In Style, G. Thomas Couser views collaborative autobiographies as invoking literary ethics, in that one person can control another's life by "making, taking, and faking the life of another person in print", though he stated most collaborative works were voluntary and beneficial to both parties. He compared I Raise My Eyes to Say Yes to a slave narrative in that Sienkiewicz-Mercer eventually emancipates herself from the facility due in part to the disability rights movement, though like a slave narrative the ability for distortion is prevalent. He notes the difference in literary ability between Sienkiewicz-Mercer (with a first-grade reading level) and Kaplan, who was college educated. Therefore, he states Kaplan created a work she could never have with her education level, and doing so he says misrepresents her true voice. Tom Coogan reviewed similar issues of authority and authenticity the Journal of Literary & Cultural Disability Studies.

Another text authored by Couser identifies the autobiography as a part of a wave of disability narratives in the 1990s that swelled to include a variety of impairments formerly limited to war and disease, such as Katharine Butler Hathaway's The Little Locksmith and Harold Russell's Victory in My Hands. Couser went on to call the book not a narrative of restitution in which a physician would perform a redemptive role nor really a rehabilitative narrative, but rather a narrative in which the world adjusts to her disabilities and one in which she liberates herself from the institution through communication via word boards. He cites the book as both an autoethnography with postcolonial notes, equally as "the impulse to define oneself in resistance to the dehumanizing categories of the medical and health service institutions" and as a patient's view of an institution, and a testimonio, where Sienkiewicz-Mercer represents other disabled individuals as a class.

== Post American publication ==
After publication in the United States, the book won a 1990 Christopher Award, presented by the Catholic Order to honor "producers, writers and directors of films, books, and television specials 'who affirm the highest values of the human spirit'". Sienkiewicz-Mercer and Kaplan attended the awards ceremony in the Time-Life Building in New York City. She received an Individual Achievement Award from the National Council on Communicative Disorders in spring 1990. In television, Sienkiewicz-Mercer appeared on Maria Shriver's Yesterday, Today and Tomorrow, where the television crew recorded a day in her life with her husband and reenactments from Belchertown, and on The Joan Rivers Show.

Homeless Book published a paperback and ebook version of I Raise My Eyes to Say Yes in Italian, called Alzo Gli Occhi Per Dire Si, in 2022.
