= Lincoln Hospital =

Lincoln Hospital may refer to:

- Lincoln Hospital (Casa Grande, Arizona), listed on the NRHP in Pinal County, Arizona
- Lincoln Hospital (Bronx, New York)
- Lincoln Hospital (Durham, North Carolina) 1901–1976
- Lincoln Community Health Center, Durham, North Carolina, an outpatient primary care facility
- Lincoln County Hospital, Lincoln, England
