= Henry H. Kendall =

American architect

Henry Hubbard Kendall FAIA
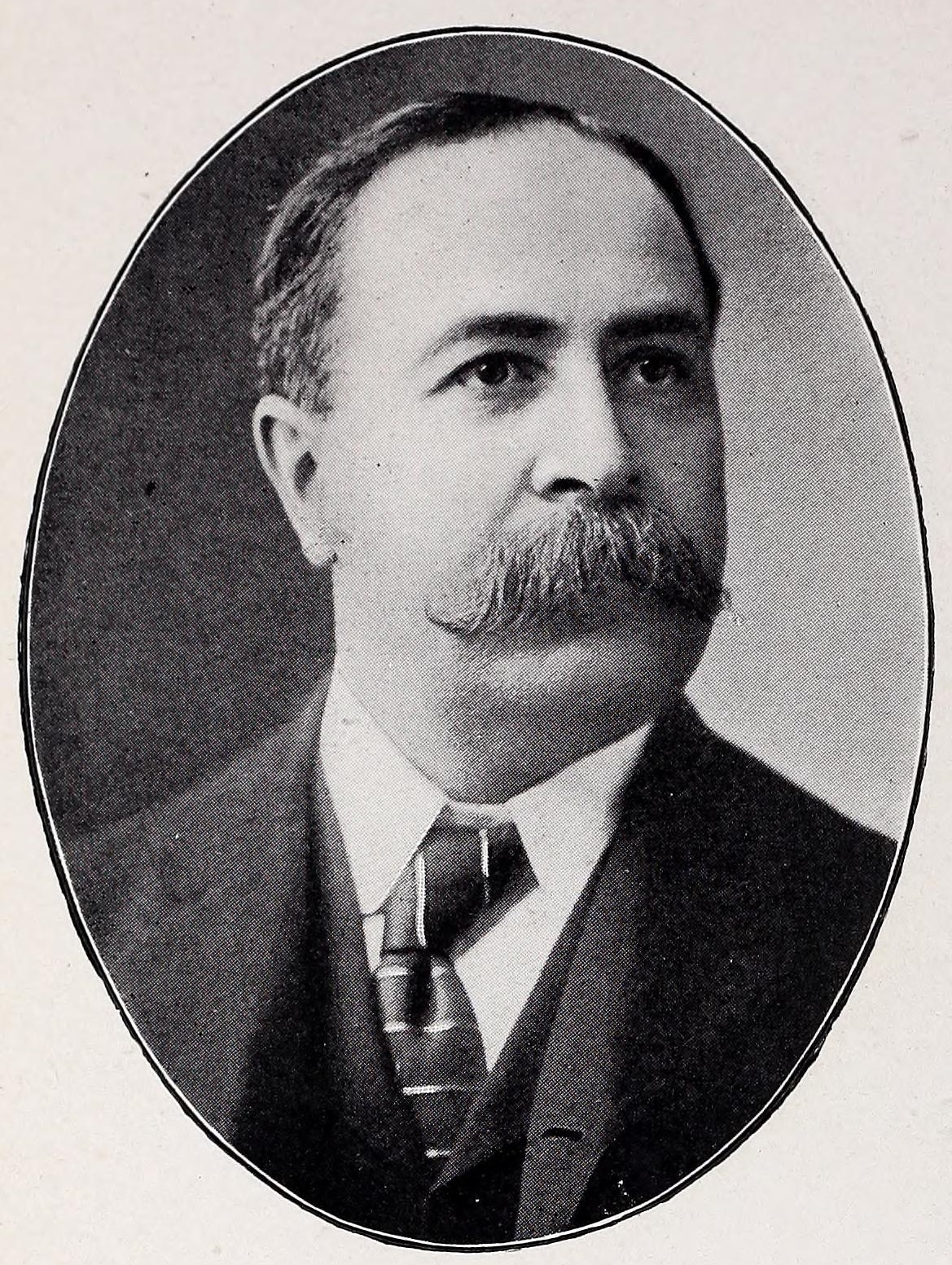
- Born: March 4, 1855; New Braintree, Massachusetts, U.S.
- Died: February 28, 1943 (aged 87); Newton Centre, Massachusetts, U.S.
- Education: Massachusetts Institute of Technology (1875)
- Occupation: Architect

18th President of the American Institute of Architects
- In office 1920–1922
- Preceded by: Thomas Rogers Kimball
- Succeeded by: William Baker Faville

Henry Hubbard Kendall (March 4, 1855 – February 28, 1943) was an American architect from Boston, Massachusetts. He wrote a letter to the U.S. Civil Service commission critiquing the low pay for government architects. Kendall was the senior partner in the firm Kendall, Taylor & Company. Several of his or the firm's works are listed on the U.S. National Register of Historic Places, for their architectural merit.

Kendall & Taylor was an architecture firm formed in 1908 by Henry H. Kendall and Bertrand E. Taylor. The firm did work in Durham, North Carolina.

== Biography ==
Kendall was born March 4, 1855, in New Braintree, Massachusetts. He graduated with a degree in architecture from the Massachusetts Institute of Technology at the age of 20.

He was the senior partner at Kendall & Stevens in Boston with Edward F. Stevens (1890–95); and then Kendall, Taylor, and Stevens (1895–1909) with Stevens and Bertrand E. Taylor. He also formed Kendall, Stevens, and Lee (1909–12) (with Frederick Clare Lee).

He was a fellow of the American Institute of Architects (AIA) and served as the group's president from 1920 to 1922.

He died February 28, 1943, at his home in Newton Centre, Massachusetts.

== Works ==
Works (with attribution) include:

- Belchertown State School, 30 State St., Belchertown, Massachusetts (Kendall, Taylor & Co.), NRHP-listed
- Westborough State Hospital, along Lyman St. N of Chauncy Lake and jct. of South St. and MA 9, Westborough, Massachusetts (Kendall, Taylor & Stevens), NRHP-listed
- White Memorial Building, 109 Main St., Houlton, Maine (Kendall, Taylor & Stevens), NRHP-listed
- Wrentham State School, Jct. of Emerald and North Sts., Wrentham, Massachusetts (Kendall & Taylor), NRHP-listed
- Contributing property Beech Hill Summer Home District, Harrisville, New Hampshire (Kendall, Taylor & Stevens), NRHP-listed
- John Sprunt Hill House, 900 S. Duke St., Durham, North Carolina (Kendall & Taylor), NRHP-listed
- Watts Hospital, Broad St. and Club Blvd., Durham, North Carolina (Kendall & Taylor), NRHP-listed
- A contributing property in the Watts-Hillandale Historic District, Durham, North Carolina (Kendall and Taylor), NRHP-listed
- One or more works in Beech Hill Summer Home District, Harrisville, New Hampshire (Kendall, Taylor & Stevens), NRHP-listed
- Massachusetts Mental Health Center, 74 Fenwood Rd., Boston, Massachusetts (Kendall, Taylor & Co.), NRHP-listed
- Watts Hospital, Broad St. and Club Blvd., Durham, North Carolina (Kendall & Taylor), NRHP-listed
- One or more works in Watts-Hillandale Historic District, Durham, North Carolina (Kendall and Taylor), NRHP-listed
