= Hastings Square Historic District =

Historic district in Massachusetts, United States

- U.S. National Register of Historic Places
- U.S. Historic district
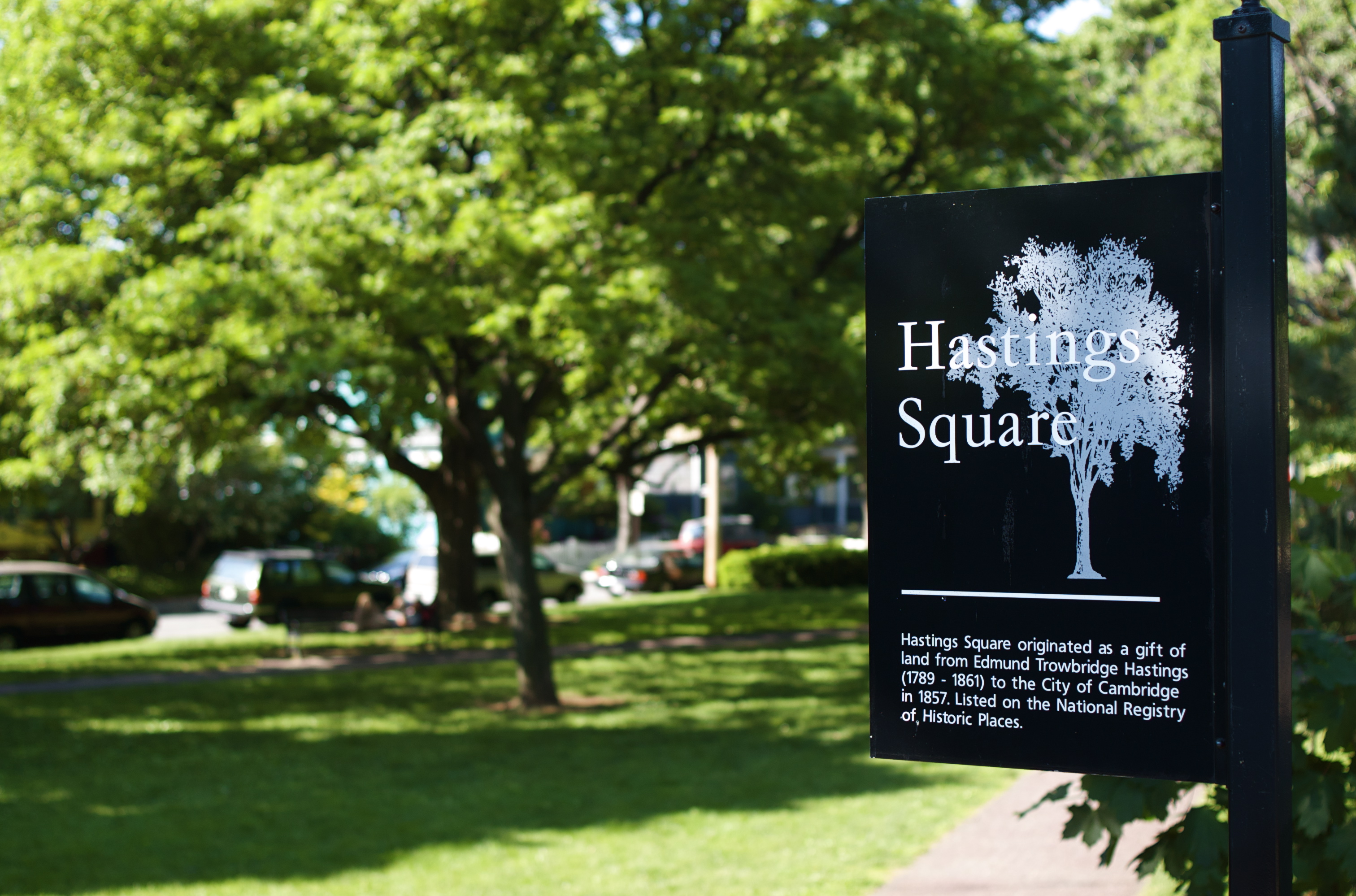

- Location within Massachusetts Location within the United States
- Location: Cambridge, Massachusetts
- Coordinates: 42°21′23″N 71°6′36″W
- Architect: Rand & Taylor; Hartwell and Richardson
- Architectural style: Queen Anne
- MPS: Cambridge MRA
- NRHP reference No.: 82001946
- Added to NRHP: April 13, 1982

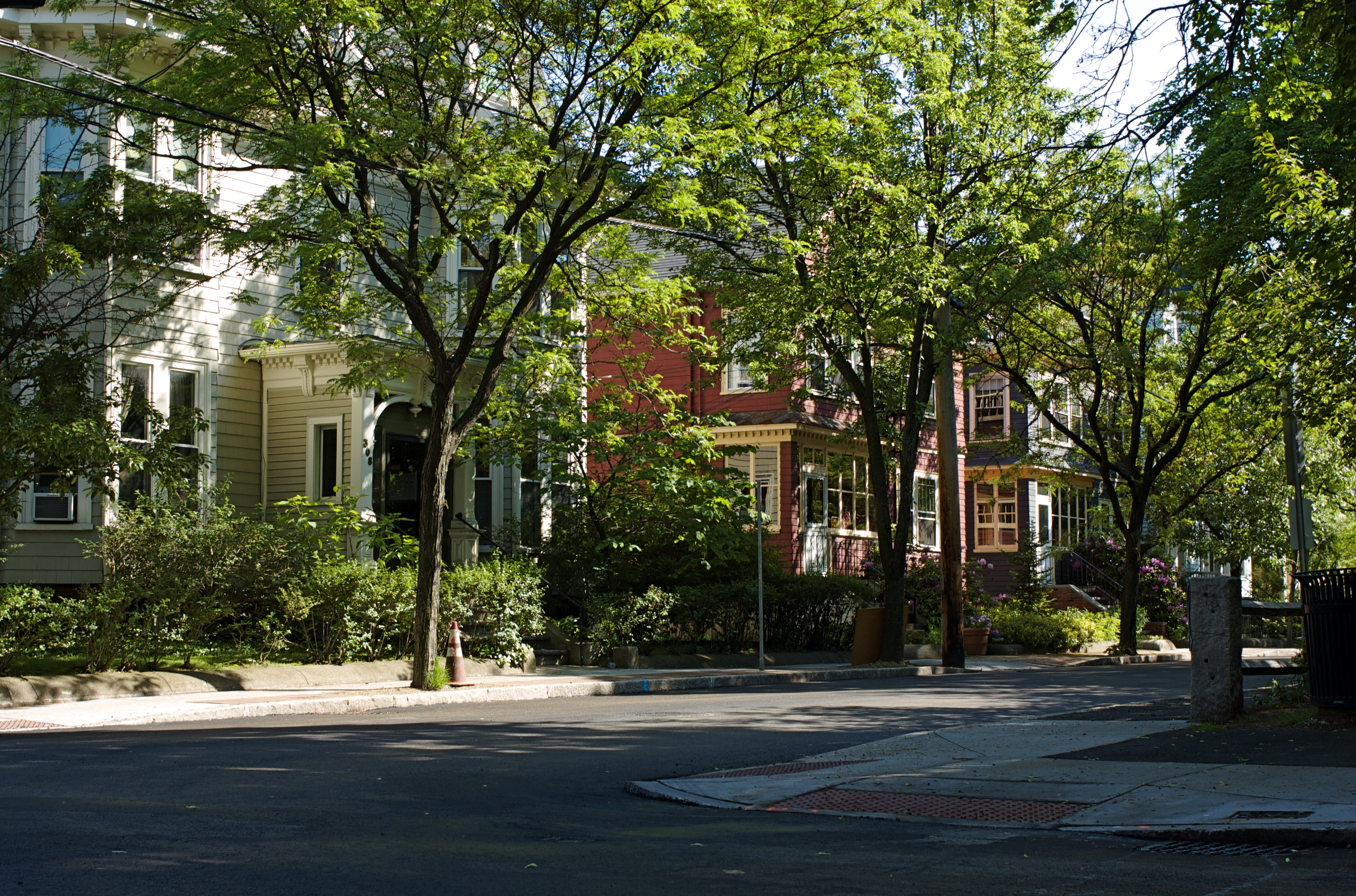
Houses along Brookline Street.

The Hastings Square Historic District is a historic district that encompasses Hastings Square, a small city park in Cambridge, Massachusetts, and the residential properties that abut it. The houses that line the streets across from the park are among the finest Queen Anne houses in the city. These properties were built between 1869 and 1892, and include two houses known to be designed by architects. The Queen Anne/Shingle style house at 302 Brookline Avenue was built in 1887 to a design by Rand & Taylor, and the 1892 Queen Anne house at 75 Henry Street was designed by Hartwell and Richardson.

The district was added to the National Register of Historic Places in 1982.

== See also ==
- National Register of Historic Places listings in Cambridge, Massachusetts
