= Sienkiewicz (surname) =

Sienkiewicz is a Polish form of the Belarusian surname Siankievič. Russian equivalent: Senkevich.

Notable people with the surname include:

- Agnieszka Sienkiewicz (born 1984), Polish actress
- Bartłomiej Sienkiewicz (born 1961), Polish politician
- Bartosz Sienkiewicz (born 2001), Polish para-athlete
- Bill Sienkiewicz (born 1958), American artist
- Henryk Sienkiewicz (1846–1916), Polish journalist and writer
- Ruth Sienkiewicz-Mercer (1950–1998), American activist

== See also ==
- Sinkiewicz
