= County General Hospital =

County General Hospital or County General Medical Center may refer to:

- Durham County General Hospital in North Carolina
- Hennepin County General Hospital in Minnesota
- Howard County General Hospital in Maryland
- Los Angeles General Medical Center in California
  - General Hospital, which used Los Angeles General Medical Center for establishing shots
- Tillamook County General Hospital in Oregon
- The fictional Chicago hospital in the TV series ER
