= George Rand =

George Rand may refer to:

- George Du Rand (born 1982), South African swimmer
- George D. Rand (1833–?), American architect
