= Lincoln Community Health Center =

Coordinates: 35.9806°N 78.8978°W

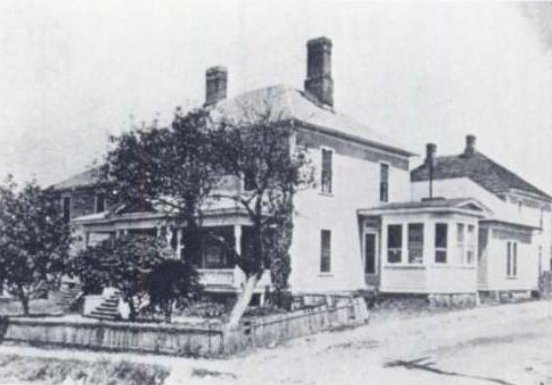
The original Lincoln Hospital, at the northwest corner of Proctor and Cozart streets, circa 1901

Lincoln Community Health Center (LCHC) is an outpatient primary care facility located in Durham, North Carolina that replaced Lincoln Hospital in 1968. LCHC offers a wide range of health services including adult medicine, pediatrics, dental, social work/mental health services, family care nursing and outreach into the home. Prenatal and family planning services are available at the Center in cooperation with the Durham County Health Department.

== History ==
The Duke family financed the construction of Lincoln Hospital in 1901, as a facility dedicated to the treatment of Durham's African-American citizens. It served as the primary African-American hospital in Durham until 1976, when it was restructured into the Lincoln Community Health Center. Charles DeWitt Watts, the hospital's chief of surgery, was instrumental in the decision to transform it into a community health center rather than close it. Its inpatient services were transferred to Durham County General Hospital as part of a 1968 referendum that also saw the closure of Watts Hospital, Durham's predominantly white healthcare facility.
