= Amherst Railway Society Railroad Hobby Show =

Annual Railway-centred show

Coordinates: 42°5′33.3″N 72°37′0.7″W

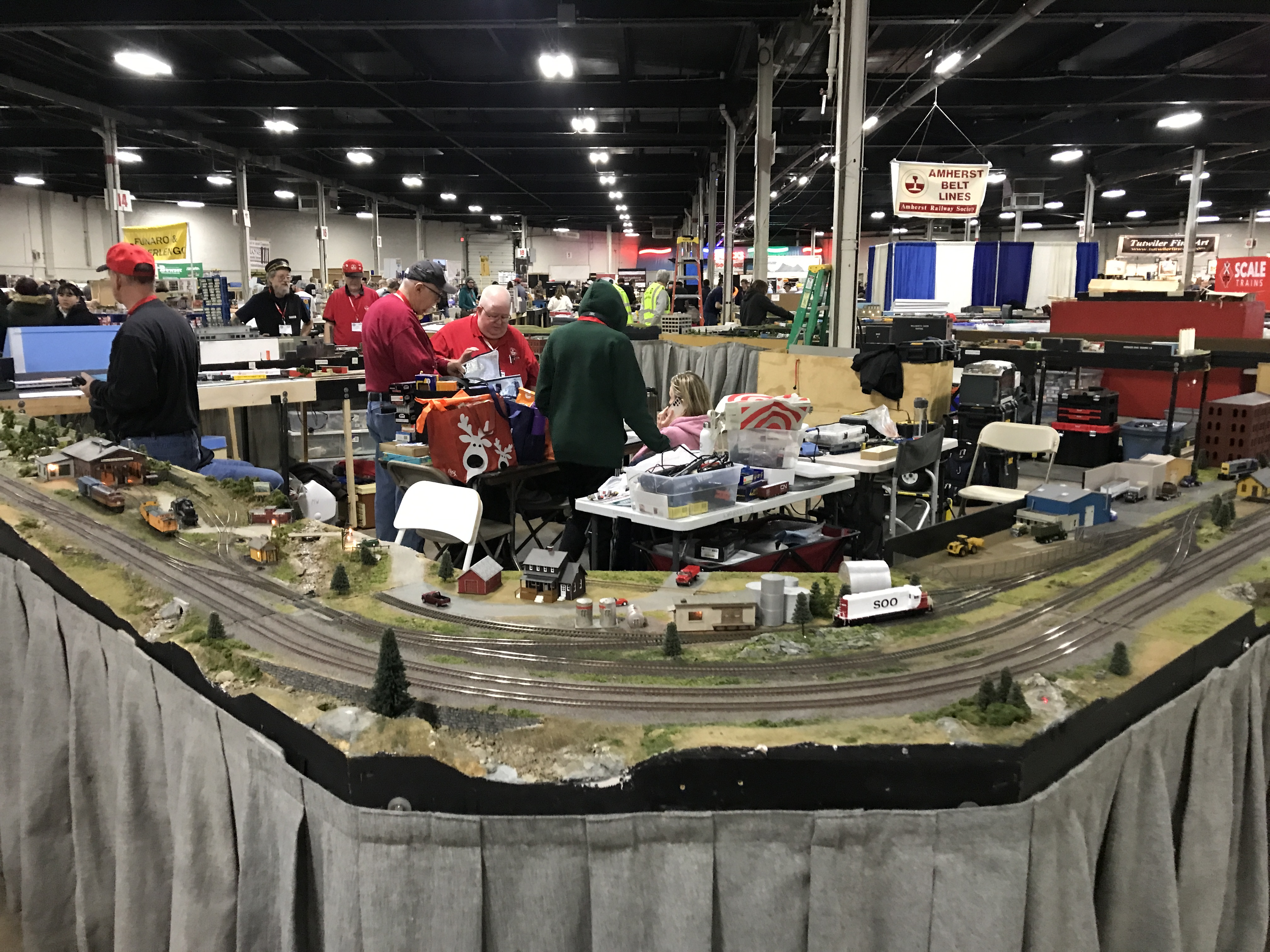
Amherst Belt Lines at the Amherst Railway Society Railroad Hobby Show

The Amherst Railway Society Railroad Hobby Show is an annual show, covering railroads, railroad Museums, model railroading, and railroad related toys, held at the Eastern States Exposition grounds in West Springfield, Massachusetts by the Amherst Railway Society. The show usually held on the last weekend in January. The show currently operates in three large buildings and one small building for a total of four buildings.

The Amherst Railway Society Hobby Show is the largest show featuring model trains in North America in terms of space size for all four buildings. Setup begins on Wednesday morning when the Floor Managers arrive to begin laying out table areas and to prepare the Mallory Building. Preparation for the show occurs year-round.

The Railroad Hobby Show is a fund-raiser for the nonprofit Amherst Railway Society. Since 1991, the society has donated more than $800,000 raised through the show to various railroad museums, historical societies, nonprofit groups and organizations dedicated to preserving railroad history and restoring railroad equipment and structures, as well as scholarships.

== History ==
The show began its existence in Amherst, Massachusetts on the campus of UMass Amherst, where it was held in the Student Union building during the 1970s. It moved to the New England Building on the Big E fair grounds in West Springfield in 1983. The show quickly outgrew the New England building and moved to the Better Living Center in 1984. The show now is held in four buildings, the Better Living Center, the Young Building, the Stroh Building, and the Mallory Complex.
