= Siankievič =

Siankievič (Belarusian: Сянкевіч) is a gender-neutral Belarusian-language surname. It is derived from the given name Sieńka (Belarusian: Сенька), a diminutive of Siamion (Simeon) (Belarusian: Сямён).

Other forms: Polish: Sienkiewicz; Russian: Senkevich (transliteration from Cyrillic alphabet).

Notable people with the surname include:

- Aliaksandr Siankievič, Belarusian statesman
- Vasiĺ Siankievič, Belarusian linguist
- Viktar Siankievič, Belarusian historian
- Viktoryja Siankievič, Belarusian journalist and TV presenter
- Jan Siankievič (b. 1995), Belarusian footballer
