= Belchertown State School =

- Massachusetts Department of Public Health
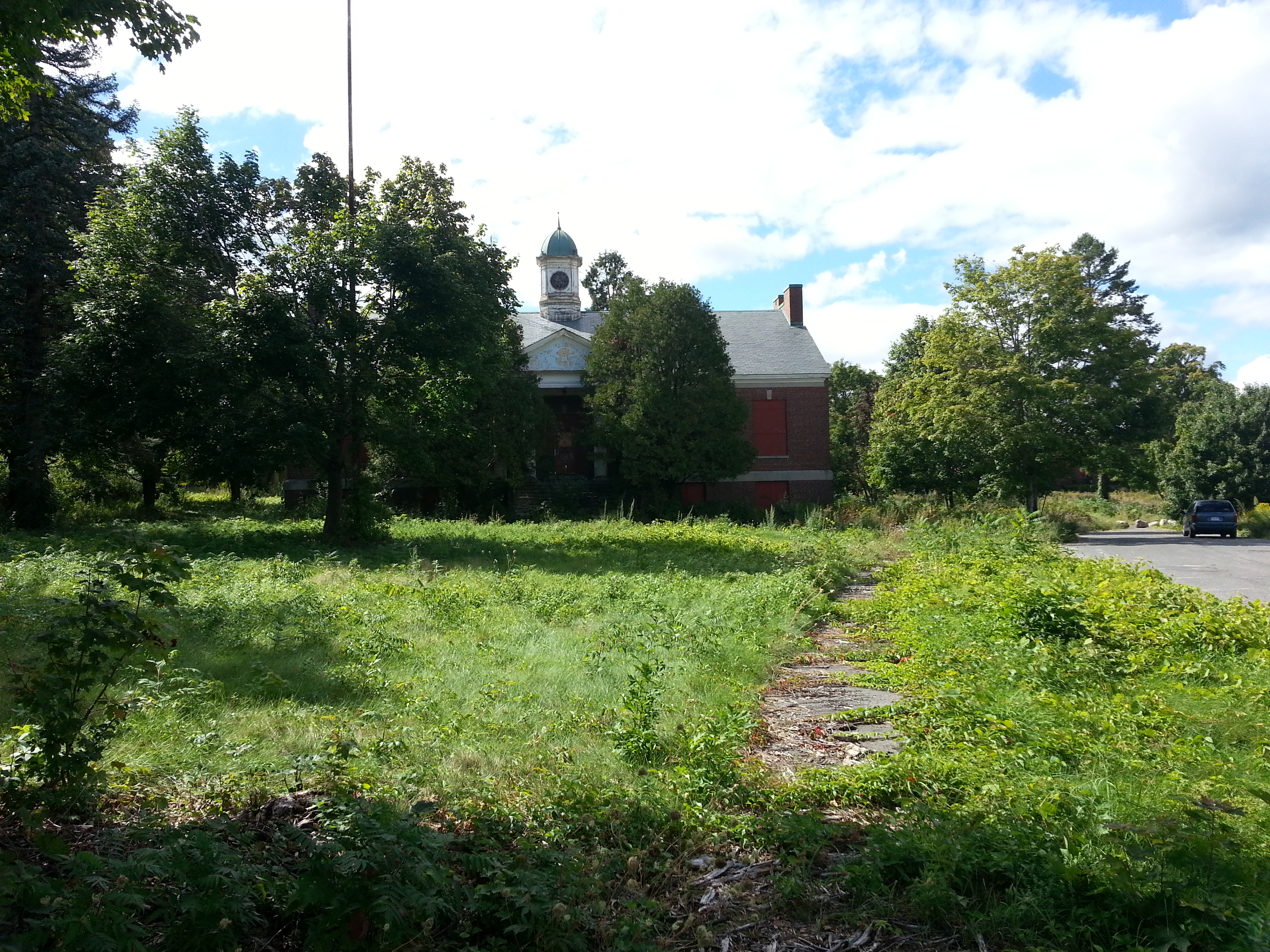

Geography
- Location: Belchertown, Massachusetts, United States
- Coordinates: 42°16′29.84″N 72°24′54.41″W

Organization
- Type: Specialist

Services
- Speciality: Psychiatric

History
- Constructed: 1915
- Opened: 1922
- Closed: December 31, 1992

Links
- Lists: Hospitals in Massachusetts
- Belchertown State School
- U.S. National Register of Historic Places
- Location within Massachusetts Location within the United States
- Location: Belchertown, Massachusetts
- Built: 1915
- Architect: Kendall, Taylor & Co.
- Architectural style: Bungalow/Craftsman, Colonial Revival, Italianate
- MPS: Massachusetts State Hospitals And State Schools MPS
- NRHP reference No.: 94000688
- Added to NRHP: July 19, 1994

The Belchertown State School for the Feeble-Minded was established in 1922 in Belchertown, Massachusetts. It became known for inhumane conditions and poor treatment of its patients, and became the target of a series of lawsuits prior to its eventual closing in 1992. The building complex was listed on the National Register of Historic Places in 1994.

== Conditions and treatment of patients ==
Located at 30 State Street, the 876-acre (3.55 km^{2}) campus contains 10 major buildings built in a Colonial Revival style by Kendall, Taylor, and Co. State schools of Massachusetts were institutions for people with intellectual disabilities or developmental disabilities, though at the time different terms were used.

Throughout its first 40 years, Belchertown operated mostly without scrutiny from outside sources. Author Benjamin Ricci (whose son lived at the school, and who later led a class-action lawsuit protesting the conditions there) referred to the conditions as "horrific," "medieval," and "barbaric." Doctors at the school had little regard for patients' mental capacity, evidenced by this quote:

His method of evaluating me consisted of looking me over during the physical exam and deciding that since I couldn't talk and apparently couldn't understand what he was saying, I must be an imbecile. [...] Since I couldn't ask him to speak up or repeat what he said, he assumed I was a moron.

Attendants on the wards were overworked, with dozens of patients in each ward. Because there was not enough time for proper toilet care, residents were left "half-naked rolling in their own excrement."

Those who were severely physically disabled were left in their beds the entire day, without any form of entertainment. Patients unable to feed themselves were force-fed by the attendants; when it was necessary to move a patient, the attendants did so roughly, sometimes causing injuries. As a result of this gross mistreatment, some patients were prone to "moaning in the hallways," "reaching into [their] diapers and spreading whatever [they] found all over, [...] repeatedly banging their heads against the walls," or any of a number of other responses.

== Changing attitudes towards institutions ==
The horrendous conditions at Belchertown were revealed in 1970 in a newspaper article entitled "The Tragedy of Belchertown". Reporter Jeremy Shanks wrote about the conditions at the state school. In 1972, Ben Ricci, parent of Belchertown resident Robert Simpson Ricci, began a class-action lawsuit against the school based on the horrific living conditions. The judge assigned to the case visited the institution without prior warning, witnessing "clogged plumbing, unattended residents drinking out of commodes, and an overwhelming stench of urine and feces. And there was incessant screaming … a soundtrack of horrible screaming.” Ricci v. Greenblatt was the first lawsuit against a state school, and others followed in Massachusetts for the next few years. The lawsuit was settled by the judge's requirement of the Commonwealth to provide services and supports to the plaintiff class throughout their lives.

In 1973, the deaths of four patients was investigated by the state and resulted in a report that found evidence of the institution's neglect and insufficient safety protocols. One of those deaths was that of Linda Buchanan, who died of exposure while outside overnight. The limited search for her was deemed insufficient by investigators, they had stopped searching at 10pm and found her body the next morning.

In 1975, two residents of Belchertown, Virginia Boyd and Ida Montufesco, sued the Belchertown registry of voters for refusing to allow them to register to vote. The clerk denied them their right to vote on the basis of being under guardianship, despite the fact that neither was under guardianship (which would deprive them of their right to vote under Massachusetts state law). The case Boyd v. Board of Registrars of Voters of Belchertown resulted in the affirmation that people residing at Belchertown could vote as long as they were not under guardianship and were not deprived of the right to vote because they live in an institution.

In 1977 a case was brought against the school on behalf of a 67-year-old mentally ill man unable to properly take care of himself with leukemia to determine if a court-appointed guardian ad litem could refuse treatment on his behalf.

In the early 1980s, self advocates led a march in Belchertown, protesting the continued existence of the state school. This was one of the self advocacy movements earliest demonstrations. The march went from the institution to the town common, where a meeting was to be held about the future of the institution. Many of the participants were former residents of the school.

In 1992, the same year the institution was planned to close, a survey was commissioned to see how residents and former residents of Belchertown felt about their living situation. Former residents and their families were much more likely to report being satisfied with community living. Over the past couple years, more and more people had left to live in the community. Some moved into apartments or homes with other former residents of Belchertown.

== Former residents ==
Some former residents wrote books about what they went through at Belchertown State School. Ruth Sienkiewicz-Mercer, a disability rights advocate with cerebral palsy, wrote I Raise My Eyes to Say Yes with Steve Kaplan. She had been a resident of the school in the 1960s and 1970s.

Donald Vitkus spent his childhood at Belchertown and wrote about it in the memoir You'll Like It Here cowritten with Ed Orzechowski. Donald Vitkus would spend the rest of his life advocating for disability rights; he also became a support person to other people with disabilities. He attended Holyoke Community College for a degree in human services. One story Vitkus relates is when he refused to take Thorazine, a psychiatric drug often used as a form of chemical restraint. A staff member tried to force it down his throat and he bit off the man's finger. As retribution, he spent 34 days in solitary confinement. Donald Vitkus died in 2018 and in accordance with his wishes, was buried in the graveyard for residents of the Belcherton State School. His grandson, speaking at the funeral, said, he was "no different than the people buried here. They were his family...We’re here to help him fulfill his last act of advocacy — a last stick in the eye to all who told him and his brothers and sisters that they would amount to nothing."

Russell W. Daniels had spent thirteen years of his life at Belchertown State School, when he was released and moved to a transitional program in Springfield in 1971. The next year he moved into his own apartment. He worked as a janitor and at a local restaurant. On August 22, 1972, a woman was found murdered in his apartment complex. Russell Daniels, a 26-year old Black man, was brought in by police for questioning. Later that day, he signed a confession that he could not read and likely did not understand. Daniels says, of the questioning, "“[The police] didn’t treat me as a human being, that’s for sure...it was pretty scary.” Despite the only evidence of guilt being the signed confession, he was found guilty and sentenced to life in prison. However, Ben Ricci, the plaintiff on the first lawsuit against Belchertown, brought the details of the case to light. In June 1974, Massachusetts Governor Francis W. Sargent ordered him transferred from the prison back to Belchertown State School on the basis that the confession had been "illegally obtained." In 1975, the conviction was overturned due to the fact that the jury was not made aware of his disability and there was no other evidence beyond the confession. Despite his innocence, Russell Daniels remained at the institution until its closure in 1992. He said of the situation, “Things like this happen sometimes to people who can’t fight back. I just want to make sure it doesn’t happen to anyone else.” After moving into the community, Daniels became a board member of Open Door Club, a self advocacy group, and worked in dining services at University of Massachusetts.

Robert Ricci, who was lead plaintiff on the case against Belchertown State School, moved into an apartment in the community in 1980, after 27 years in Belchertown. In the years after he left the institution, he often attended Amherst Railway Society meetings and worked at Amherst Town Hall, "particularly enjoy[ing]" delivering mail to the Amherst Fire Department. Robert died on December 3, 2025, at 78 years old. His father, Benjamin Ricci, wrote a book about his struggle against the inhumane conditions at Belchertown State School titled Crimes Against Humanity. Benjamin died at Cooley Dickinson Hospital in Northampton, Massachusetts on January 21, 2006, at 82 years old.

== School closure and redevelopment ==
After hobbling along for several more years, Belchertown State School was finally closed in 1992. Two years later it was added to the National Register of Historic Places. More recent improvements have been the makeover of Foley Field into a baseball diamond for the local Little League team, and restoration of the overgrown cemetery (with numbers marking the graves) to appear cleaner and properly memorialize dead patients by name. In 2001, a town meeting designated the school property as an Economic Opportunity Area for 20 years. This economic development plan provides tax incentives to businesses who establish themselves on the site.

As of November 14, 2012, the town of Belchertown had decided on a $1.25 million project, that would hand over the ownership of the land to a new owner. The new owners plan was to demolish the existing buildings which contained asbestos. The plan was to replace them with a new facility of 170-units of assisted living homes. The project was due to be completed by Winter of 2014 but development fell under and the land owner backed out. The buildings had been boarded up and road blocks were placed, but they have remained untouched. Plans to demolish the buildings started up again in November 2014, with the same idea to create an assisted-living facility.

By July 2016, two of the most notable buildings were demolished, the hospital and the iconic auditorium buildings.

From 2015 onward, the campus underwent multiple arson attempts by vandals. The public outcry led to a significantly higher police presence and arrests that followed.

== Buildings ==
Ground was broken at the Belchertown State School in March 1919. Construction was completed in 1922 with subsequent additions thereafter.

- Administrative Block - two buildings connected by a corridor. Most known for its small white clock tower. Used for administrators only.
- Cottages - nine white houses where more capable patients resided. Caretakers are asked in 1972 to vacate to make room for excess patients. All demolished by 2017.
- Hospital - held approximately 50 beds for children with disabilities. The building was demolished in 2015 for redevelopment.
- Infirmary - a ward where more-seriously disabled residents resided, which was demolished in 2016.
- Auditorium/Gymnasium - one of the most infamous buildings at BSS. Below ground contained a gym. Demolished in 2015 after PCB concerns.
- Vocational Block - a building where female patients could partake in activities such as coloring, painting, and knitting. Demolished in 2015.
- Industrial Block - a building where male patients could learn carpentry, basketball, and other "male" tasks. Demolished in 2015.
- A & K Wards - custodial buildings that housed male and female patients respectively. Demolished in 1977 and 1979, they symbolic acts of progress.
- G Ward - the campus's newest building. Built in 1964, it was considered inadequate for the facility's residents due to its large windows and location. Demolished in 2017.
- Custodials - wards that were nicknamed after their "+, or plus" shaped layout. The Belchertown campus was littered with these custodials.
- Kitchen Block - a building where residents could receive meals. Sewage often spewed out of the drains and onto the kitchen and dining hall floors.
- Cannery - where unused food was canned and preserved for future use.
- Drying Ground - resident laundry was processed here. Like many other state schools, residents often never ended up wearing the same clothes after laundry as it was often lost.
- Maintenance - includes a garage, loading dock, and shed for the general upkeep of the facility.
- Power Station - generated steam power for the facility until the complex switched to supplied power by a third-party sometime in the 1970s. The building was still used as a warehouse.
- Numerous fallout shelters are located within the forest surrounding the Belchertown State School campus.

== See also ==
- List of defunct Massachusetts State Mental Facilities
- National Register of Historic Places listings in Hampshire County, Massachusetts
