= Amherst Railway Society =

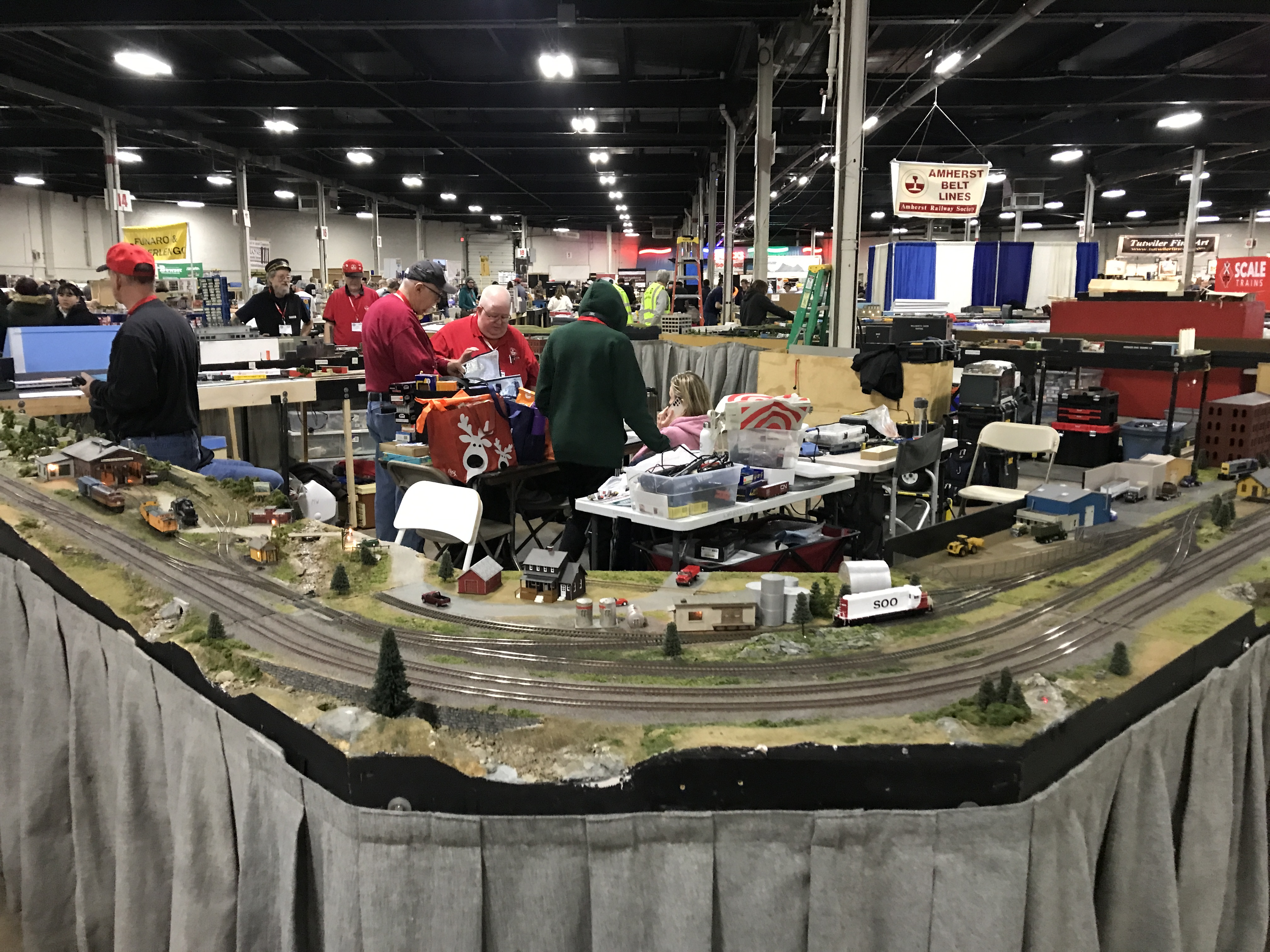
- Formation: 1963 (Inc. 1963)
- Members: 275
- President: Joe Biagioni
- Website: amherstRail.org

The Amherst Railway Society is a society of railway enthusiasts located in Palmer, Massachusetts which is also the home of seven railroads. The society puts on an annual Amherst Railway Society Railroad Hobby Show at the Eastern States Exposition Fairgrounds in West Springfield, Massachusetts, in late January of every year. The attendance at the two-day show, which has over 7 acres of displays, usually averages twenty five thousand people, making it one of the largest two-day train shows in North America.

The Amherst Railway Society has about 446 members who share some aspect of railroading as a common interest. Monthly meetings cover current topics in railroad news and offer slide shows, movies or a prominent speaker on a railroading topic.

Dates for the 2025 show are January 25th and 26th.

== History ==
According to written minutes, the Amherst Railway Society came into existence on October 15, 1963, in Goessman Laboratory, Room 151 at the University of Massachusetts Amherst. The first program on October 15, 1963, was "Mexican Steam" by Everett Turner, "American Diesels" by Al Wynne, and some steam shots from around Amherst by Harvey Allen. Many of the people attending the first meeting had been active in a previous UMass railroad group that was organized by students. That group ceased to exist by 1963. The Amherst Railway Society quickly grew and five years later, the organization put on its own train show that is now held every year in West Springfield.

== Railroad Hobby Show ==
The annual Amherst Railway Society Railroad Hobby Show has become the biggest railroad show in the country. In 1993 and 1994 the Amherst Railway Society received the Walthers Showmanship Award for sponsoring the event.

Proceeds from the show are used to promote interest in railroads. Donations have been made to various railroad museums, historical societies, restoration projects and scholarship funds. Organizations that have received donations include: the Fall River and Old Colony Museum, the 470 Club's Boston and Maine diesel locomotive restoration project, the Boston and Maine Historical Society, the Chester Foundation Station Project, the Wiscasset Waterville and Farmington Building and Car Fund as well as trolley museums in Shelburne Falls, Massachusetts, Warehouse Point, Connecticut, and Kennebunk, Maine.

The ARS has given away over $800,000 in grants to railroad related organizations.
