= Senkevich =

Senkevich is a Russian form of the Belarusian surname Siankievič. Polish equivalent: Sienkiewicz.

- Alexander Senkevich (born 1941), Russian Indologist, philologist, translator from Hindi, writer, and poet.
- Anton Senkevich (1970–2010), Russian footballer
- Artyom Senkevich, Belarusian ice hockey player
- Yuri Senkevich (1937–2003), Russian doctor, scientist, journalist and TV personality

== See also ==
- 7980 Senkevich, an asteroid named after Yurij Aleksandrovich Senkevich
- Oleksandr Senkevych, mayor of Mykolaiv, Ukraine
