= Watts–Hillandale Historic District =

Historic district in North Carolina, United States

- U.S. National Register of Historic Places
- U.S. Historic district
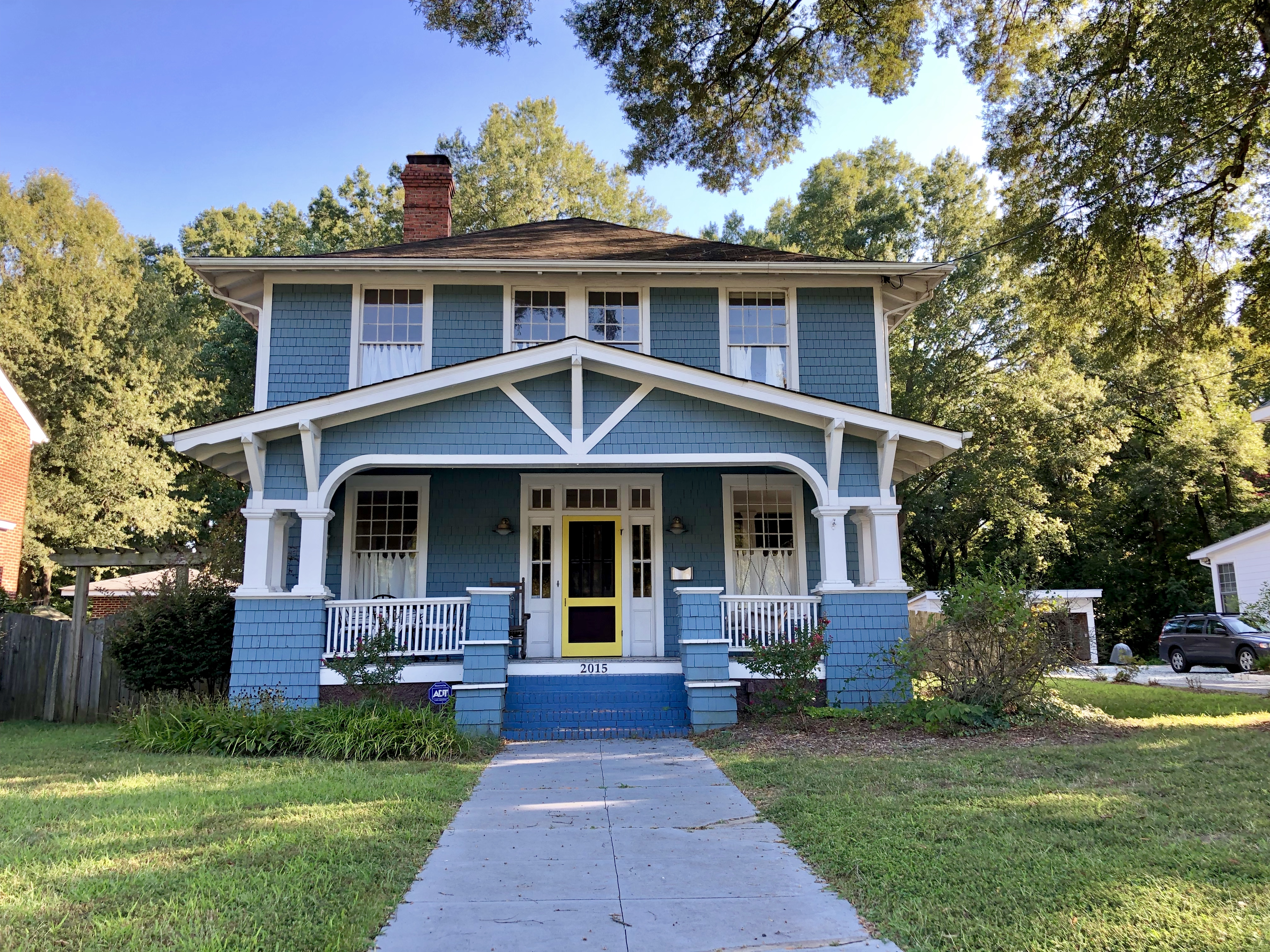
- Contributing House on West Club Boulevard

- Location within North Carolina Location within the United States
- Location: Roughly bounded by Durham Waterworks, Wilson St., Sprunt Ave., Broad St., Englewood Ave., and Hillsborough Rd., Durham, North Carolina
- Coordinates: 36°01′14″N 78°55′45″W
- Area: 178 acres (72 ha)
- Built: 1909
- Architect: Kendall and Taylor; Sally, John, et al.
- Architectural style: Mission/spanish Revival, Colonial Revival, et al.
- MPS: Durham MRA
- NRHP reference No.: 01000427
- Added to NRHP: April 25, 2001

Watts–Hillandale Historic District, also known as Club Acres and Englewood, is a national historic district located at Durham, Durham County, North Carolina. The district encompasses 446 contributing buildings, 2 contributing sites, and 2 contributing structures in a predominantly residential section of Durham. They were built after 1909 and include notable examples of Mission Revival and Colonial Revival style architecture. Located in the district is the separately listed Watts Hospital complex.

It was listed on the National Register of Historic Places in 2001.

The neighborhood is home to active community members and leaders. Halloween, particularly on Club Boulevard, is full of trick-or-treaters from across the city, with homes on the street giving out treats to 1,000 or more children who visit for the festivities.
