= Ruth Sienkiewicz-Mercer =

American disability rights activist (1950–1998)

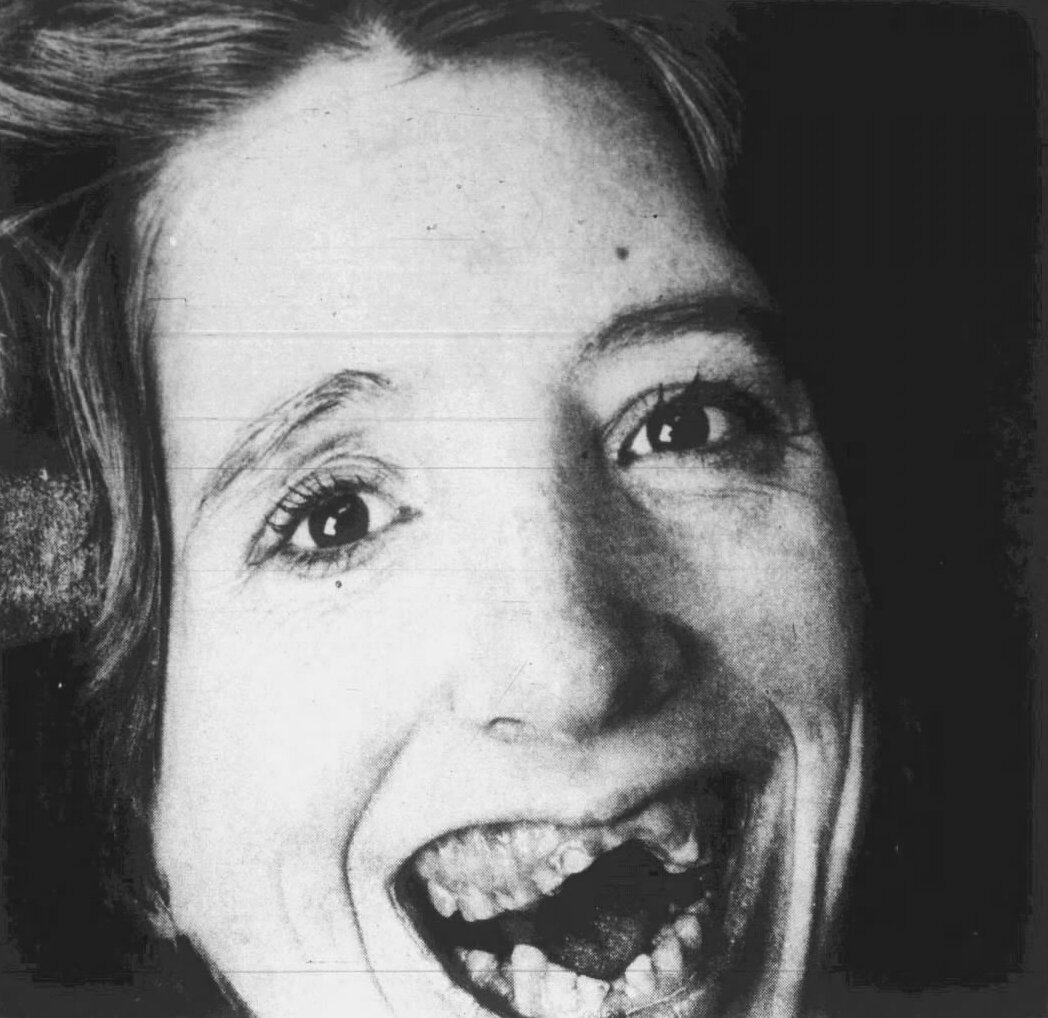
Ruth Sienkiewicz-Mercer in 1983

Ruth Christine Sienkiewicz-Mercer (September 23, 1950 – August 8, 1998) was an American author, quadriplegic, and disability rights activist best known for her autobiography I Raise My Eyes to Say Yes, co-authored with Steven B. Kaplan.

== Biography ==
Ruth Christine Sienkiewicz-Mercer was born in Northampton, Massachusetts, on September 23, 1950. She was a healthy baby, but had a severe bout of encephalitis at the age of five weeks. At thirteen months, she was diagnosed with cerebral palsy resulting from the encephalitis. Her control over her entire body, except for her face and digestive system, was impaired; although not completely paralyzed, she could not care for herself or communicate through speech as most people know it. Due to her inability to communicate normally, she was diagnosed as an "imbecile" at the age of five.

She lived mostly with her family until age eleven, with some brief stays in rehabilitation centers invariably terminated by her family's poor financial situation. As she approached her teens, it became increasingly difficult for her mother and family to care for her. Her parents decided to send her to the Belchertown State School, an institution for the people with intellectual or developmental disabilities. There, like many of the institution's patients, she was mistreated. She spent most of the next eight years lying in bed in a ward, ministered to by overworked attendants who often force-fed her.

A staff turnover in 1967 began to change things, as Sienkiewicz-Mercer learned to communicate with some of the new attendants and formed close friendships with them. Several attempts by the school at establishing a physical therapy and education program resulted in the development of a word board for her, providing her with a reliable method of communication for the first time.

In 1973, the massive building housing the mental wards was renovated, and she was moved to a small temporary building with nineteen other patients. The attendants there were friendly and the atmosphere far less oppressive than the wards; the patients were given greater liberty, to the extent that some were allowed to drink alcohol. With the support of many friends, she and some fellow patients left the State School and moved into their own apartment in 1978. One of these ex-patients, Norman Mercer, she married. The year after, her autobiography was published to media attention and critical acclaim.

After her departure from Belchertown, she became a disability rights activist, giving speeches with the aid of an assistant and later a speech synthesizer in cities across America. Her efforts may have contributed to the closure of Belchertown State School in 1992.

== Wordboards ==
Sienkiewicz-Mercer used four wordboards to communicate with her staff, friends and the general public. The assistant would hold the boards where Sienkiewicz-Mercer could see them and then point to and speak aloud the word Sienkiewicz-Mercer indicated with her eyes. In this way, sentences, paragraphs and an entire book were created.

Wordboard 1	Wordboard 2	Wordboard 3	Wordboard 4

== Death ==
Ruth Sienkiewicz-Mercer died in Northampton, Massachusetts on August 8, 1998, aged 47.
