= Lincoln Hospital (Durham, North Carolina) =

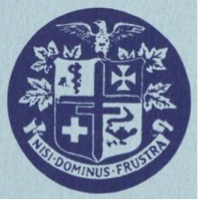

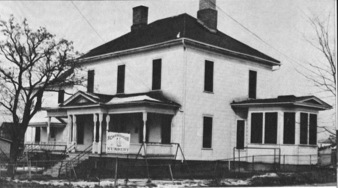
- A photograph of a wooden frame house in 1901, Logo: if not the Lord, [it is] in vain.

Geography
- Location: Durham, North Carolina, United States
- Coordinates: 35.9906°N 78.9136°W (approximate)

Organization
- Type: General hospital for African Americans
- Affiliated university: Lincoln Hospital School of Nursing, Howard University, North Carolina Central University

Services
- Beds: 123

History
- Opened: 1901
- Closed: 1976

Links
- Lists: Hospitals in North Carolina

Lincoln Hospital was a medical facility located in Durham, North Carolina founded to serve the African Americans of Durham County and surrounding areas. With original hospital construction financed by the Duke family, Lincoln served as the primary African American hospital in Durham from its opening in 1901 until 1976, when it closed and transferred its inpatient services to Durham County General Hospital.

Despite its cultural setting within the Jim Crow South, Lincoln Hospital developed and thrived due to a complex web of inter- and intraracial cooperation. Lincoln's medical staff sought to reduce morbidity and mortality of Durham blacks by targeting maternal and child health, infectious disease, and health behavior through health education programs, specialized clinics, and free medical care. Lincoln expanded educational opportunities for blacks through their nursing, residency, and surgery programs during a time when few opportunities existed for blacks in healthcare.

== History ==
=== Origins ===
African Americans experienced serious health disadvantages in 20th century Durham, North Carolina. Modern analyses have shown that inadequate housing, insufficient heat, poor ventilation, inadequate diet, and overwork contributed to multiple medical problems, including malnutrition and infectious diseases such as tuberculosis, typhoid, pneumonia, diphtheria, measles, and influenza. Rapid industrialization from the tobacco and textile industries increased the spread of diseases caused by particulate matter and caused strain on existing infrastructure. Excluding stillbirths, the death rate among Durham African Americans in 1910 was 26.0/1000 compared to 16.6/1000 for whites. Widespread belief that blacks were physically and mentally inferior to whites led to white apathy towards disparities in white and black morbidity and mortality. Separation of Durham's black and white communities allowed health disparities to flourish.

While this segregation widened the socioeconomic and health gap between black and white communities, it also facilitated the development of a strong black business community and a black elite with the power to address these disparities. The rise of "Black Wall Street" (Parrish Street, Durham) and black businesses at the turn of the century, such as NC Mutual Life Insurance, brought success and credibility to select members of Durham's black community. Leaders of these organizations exhibited social dexterity in maintaining good relations between blacks and whites through these economic connections. Recognizing Durham's health disparities, black leaders garnered support for a black hospital from white philanthropists.

Arguing that a black hospital would ultimately benefit whites and maintain segregation, Aaron McDuffie Moore, Stanford Lee Warren, and John Merrick persuaded the Duke family (Washington Duke) to fund Lincoln Hospital in lieu of building a monument on the campus of Trinity College (today Duke University) to commemorate slaves who had served officers in the Confederate Army. Aaron McDuffie Moore (Durham's first black physician) reminded the Duke family that blacks worked with whites in small intimate spaces, and that high rates of disease in blacks would affect the health of whites. Ben and James Duke gave an original donation of $8,550 for the hospital's construction in Hayti, a black neighborhood in Durham. The cornerstone read:

With grateful appreciation and loving remembrance of the fidelity and faithfulness of the Negro slaves to the Mothers and Daughters of the Confederacy during the Civil War, this institution was founded by one of the Fathers and Sons: B.N. Duke, J.B. Duke, W. Duke. Not one act of disloyalty was recorded against them.

The Duke Family remained patrons of the hospital until its closure.

=== Financial and material support ===
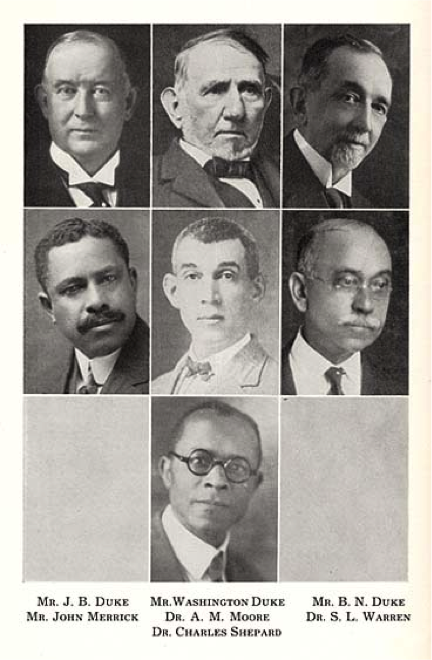
Lincoln Hospital founders.

Lincoln hospital's black leaders claimed the hospital was "a striking example of what can be accomplished in a community where both races work together." However, in the beginning, whites generally kept a distance by confining their involvement to financial contribution. Eventually, this relationship evolved to include whites in the running of the hospital. For example, Dr. Max Schiebel, who worked at the hospital in 1944, joined the surgery department long before official integration of the medical staff in 1925. (see surgery)

The hospital functioned with support from private institutions, black and white individuals, and the governments of Durham County and other surrounding counties. Community support was reflected in the hospital's leadership bodies, including the Lincoln Hospital Board of Trustees. Begun in 1921, the 21-member board was made up of one-third members selected from the white community, while the rest were appointed from African American leading institutions and families in Durham, as well as the local city and county governments. The Board also included a member of the Duke family, an appointee from NC Farmers and Mechanics Bank, and a representative from NC Mutual Life Insurance Company. Finally, a black woman, white man, and black man were elected from the community to serve on the Board. Black and white women in the Durham community were responsible for supplying linens, furnishings, and other supplies for the hospital and the nurses' home through community-wide donation drives. White clubwomen tracked the hospital's quality of care, supervised nursing students, and acted as liaisons between the institution and the white community. Lincoln Hospital's Lady Board of Managers acted as a female leadership body in the hospital, responsible for fundraising for the hospital and institutional improvements. Durham County also supplied funds to run the hospital.

With community support, the hospital established a mission to provide care regardless of a patient's ability to pay. The amount of charity patients admitted to Lincoln was not confined to a certain quota. According to its 1938 report, two-thirds of Lincoln Hospitals 1,879 patients were charity cases. On move-in day for the new facility in 1925, 18 of the 85 patients admitted were from other towns where there were no healthcare facilities for blacks. Reflecting the broad-based community support of and corporate pride in the institution, Durham residents frequently referred to Lincoln as "our hospital."

=== Facilities ===
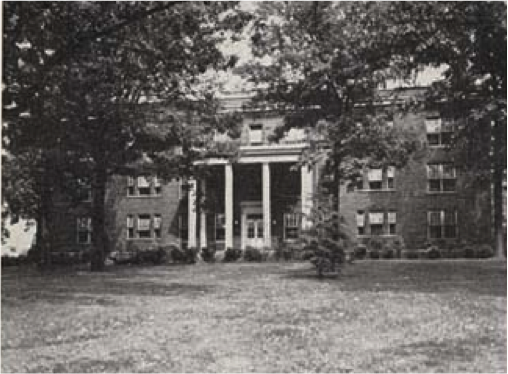
Lincoln hospital, second, brick structure circa 1938.

The original wood-frame hospital building, located at the corner of Cozart St. (Alley) and East Proctor St. and housing up to 50 patients, was damaged in a 1924 fire. Recruitment of additional funds initially meant to expand the original facilities allowed the immediate construction of a new building, which was completed in 1924 and opened on January 15, 1925. The Nurses Home was also added in 1924 as a gift from B.N. Duke in memory of his son, Angier B. Duke.

== Medical services ==
Consonant with its primary mission of patient care, Lincoln Hospital provided access to some of the best black physicians on the East coast through its departments of medicine, gynecology and obstetrics, and surgery. The department of medicine at Lincoln Hospital provided general services for venereal disease prevention and treatment, emergency care, cancer, and routine adult medicine. Over the years, the medical departments adapted to the specialties of the attending physicians, and the needs of the public at large.

=== Radiology and laboratory services ===
Full-time doctors at Duke and Watts hospitals provided lab and radiology services for Lincoln, providing qualified supervision for these specialties without on-site expertise. A notable pioneer in this department was Margaret Kennedy Goodwin (head radiology technician, 1938–1976), the first female African American to be elected to membership in the American Registry of Radiology technicians. Goodwin also led a two-year training program for lab and radiology technicians that began in 1950.

=== Gynecology and obstetrics ===
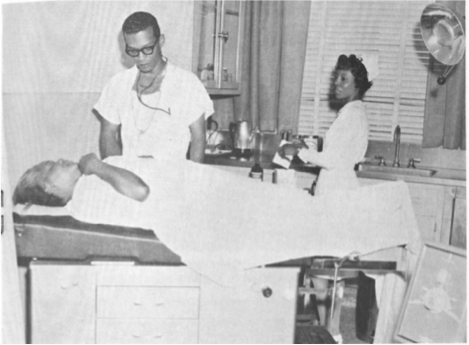
Dr. Moore, Obstetrician-Gynecologist, examining a patient, undated.

The hospital focused on increasing the number of hospital deliveries, developing maternal education programs, and maintaining birth follow-up programs to reduce maternal and infant mortality. At the time, infant mortality was very high: 411 deaths per 1000 live births among black children, excluding miscarriages and stillbirths, versus 137.5 per 1000 for whites in 1910 and many mothers died at home due to birth complications. Education about the risks of birth increased rates of hospital deliveries for black women in Durham. Prenatal care at Lincoln Hospital also included screening for sexually transmitted infections (STIs) such as syphilis. Mothers who tested positive were counseled and treated to prevent transmission of STIs to their babies at birth.

=== Pediatrics ===
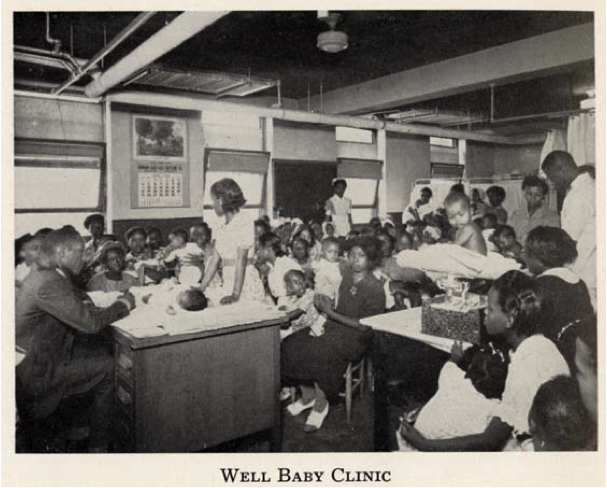
Well Baby Clinic at Lincoln Hospital, circa 1938.

In addition to STI screening at birth, Lincoln also worked to reduce child mortality through postnatal and childhood care in the Well Baby Clinic. Black mothers were encouraged to bring their children back for check-ups, to ensure that their babies were reaching growth and weight standards for their age. Proper diets and feeding schedules were also taught to the mother. All babies at the clinic were immunized. In 1963, the state calculated the rate of infection among African American children to be lower than the rate among white children in Durham. The pediatric department also later offered specialized programs such as the Crippled Children's Clinic—a joint effort between Lincoln and Duke Hospital's orthopedic departments. In 1937, the infant death rate for babies under one year of age in Durham County was reduced to 52.2 per 1000 live births among whites and 94.2 per 1000 among blacks.

=== Surgery ===
The Lincoln Hospital surgery department provided comprehensive surgical services to African Americans unavailable at nearby hospitals. While services were considered subpar in the early years of the hospital, Dr. Max Schiebel (Chief of surgery, 1944–1971) revitalized the program by raising standards and providing surgical expertise.

Dr. Charles DeWitt Watts (1917 – 2004) served as Chief of Surgery during the 1950s and 1960s he began training Howard University residents in a joint program with Duke University Medical School, where—because Duke was segregated—residents would come through Duke but be trained at Lincoln.

== Health education ==
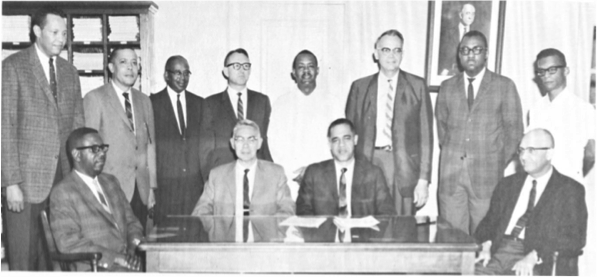
Lincoln Hospital Medical Staff, 1965–1966.

In the hospital's early years, a partnership with Leonard Medical School at Shaw University (the first four-year medical school for blacks in the U.S. and the first medical school in North Carolina) served as a pipeline to practice at Lincoln. Seven of the original Lincoln physicians were graduates of Leonard Medical School. The Leonard school closed in 1918, limiting local opportunities for black medical education and spurring Lincoln to establish its own training programs. Lincoln became a magnet for some of the most talented black physicians on the East coast. Partnerships with Duke, Watts, and other hospitals in North Carolina ensured a steady supply of residents for Lincoln's education programs. The Lincoln Nursing School (1901–1976) drew young African American women to its well-regarded program throughout the hospital's tenure. In 1934, the reorganization of Lincoln hospital and the acquisition of funds from the Julius Rosenwald Fund and the Duke Endowment led to the establishment of medical internship and residency programs.

=== Lincoln Hospital School of Nursing ===
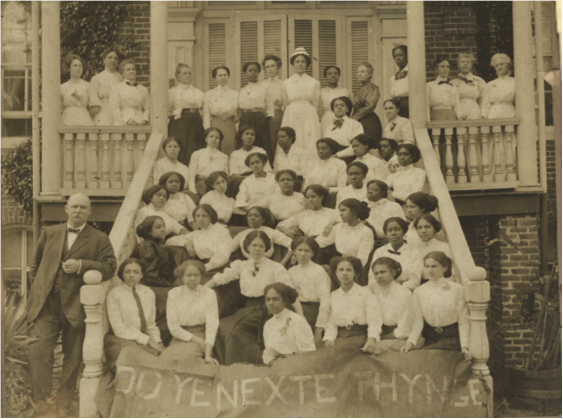
Lincoln nursing students, undated.

The Board of Trustees organized the Lincoln Hospital School of Nursing in 1903. The program was approved by the Board of Nurse Examiners of the State of North Carolina. Julia Latta was the first director of nursing from 1903 to 1910. The curriculum design included courses to be taken at North Carolina College in Durham, N.C, and formal affiliation with the college was established in 1930. The specialty areas of Pediatrics and Psychiatry were taught through affiliations with other hospitals including Meharry Hospital in Nashville, Tennessee and Cherry Hospital in Goldsboro, N.C. After the first year of training, nursing students worked alongside nursing graduate students to take care of patients, supplying essential, inexpensive, primary care. The Nursing School provided greater job and educational opportunities for young black women in Durham. The hospital maintained accreditation with the NC Board of Nurse Examiners until loss of patients compromised the school's clinical program in the 1960s.

=== Medical internships and residencies ===
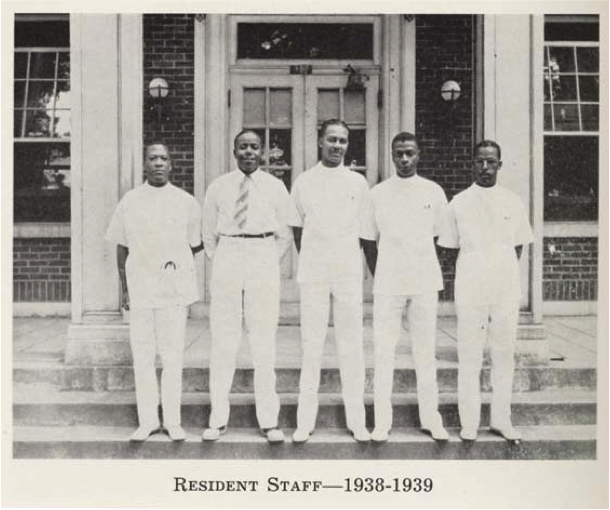
Residents, 1938–1939

Lincoln Hospital was accredited by the American Medical Association for internship training in 1925 and by American College of Surgeons in 1933. Pediatric, orthopedic, internal medicine, surgery, and ob-gyn residents, primarily from Duke University medical school rotated through Lincoln from 1930 into the late 1960s. Medical and surgical staff of the hospital spent time teaching residents and interns on rounds in the wards. Many Lincoln students, both black and white, went on to achieve distinction in their field.

=== Continuing medical education ===
Beginning in the 1930s, Lincoln hospital became a popular place to host continuing medical education conferences due to the proximity of the N.C. College for Negroes dormitories, which provided a place for physicians to stay in a time when most blacks were barred from southern hotels. In 1935, Lincoln hosted its first postgraduate clinic, which became an annual event. The clinic drew black and white physicians from all over North and South Carolina and Virginia to join speakers from the University of North Carolina at Chapel Hill and Duke University.

== Later years ==
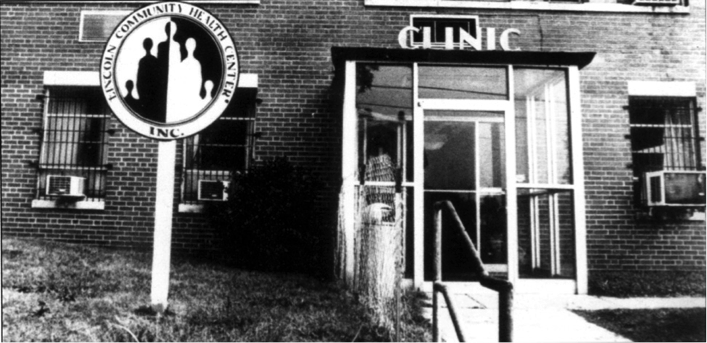
Lincoln Community Health Center, undated.

The hospital emerged from the Depression as one of the leading hospitals for blacks or whites in the Carolinas. However, by 1950, Durham residents recognized that both Lincoln and Watts hospitals were providing outmoded services. A joint proposal for Federal funding to expand both Lincoln and Watts Hospitals was submitted to the North Carolina Medical Care Commission in 1950. A local bond measure passed, providing money for construction of a new 33 bed wing, completed in 1953 and increasing Lincoln's bed total to 123.

Like many black institutions, Lincoln Hospital declined after integration. By the 1960s, both Lincoln and Watts Hospitals were providing subpar medical services to Durham. In 1965, Lincoln hospital integrated its medical staff. While white and black medical staff continued to practice at the hospital, patients of both races were increasingly admitted to other hospitals.

Charles DeWitt Watts founded Lincoln Community Health Center (LCHC) in 1971. The health center and hospital operated together in the Fayetteville St. facility until September 25, 1976, when inpatients were transferred to Durham County General Hospital. Today, the center offers a wide range of health services including adult medicine, pediatrics, dental, social work/mental health services, family care nursing, and community outreach. Prenatal and family planning services are available at the Center in cooperation with the Durham County Health Department. Building on the legacy of its predecessor institution, Lincoln Hospital, LCHC is dedicated to fulfilling its mission statement: "As a leader in the provision of community health care, Lincoln Community Health Center is committed to collaborating with other institutions dedicated to the continuous improvement in services being provided to decrease health disparities, while assuring access to all."

== Bibliography ==
- Brown, Leslie (2008). Upbuilding Black Durham: gender, class, and Black community development in the Jim Crow South. Chapel Hill, N.C.: University of North Carolina Press. ISBN 978-0-8078-5835-6.
- Reynolds, P. Preston (2001). Durham's Lincoln Hospital. Charleston, SC: Arcadia Publishing. ISBN 978-0-7385-1366-9.
- Rich, W.M. (December 1938). Thirty-Eighth Annual Report. University Library, The University of North Carolina at Chapel Hill: Documenting the American South.
