= Style (journal) =

- Discipline: Linguistics
- Language: English
- Edited by: John V. Knapp

Publication details
- History: 1967–present
- Publisher: Penn State University Press
- Frequency: Quarterly

Standard abbreviations
- ISO 4: Style

Indexing
- ISSN: 0039-4238 (print); 2374-6629 (web)

Links
- Journal homepage

Style is a peer-reviewed academic journal of style, stylistics, and poetics in literature published by Penn State University Press. It is indexed by the Arts and Humanities Citation Index, International Bibliography of Periodical Literature, MLA International Bibliography, and Scopus.
