= Watts Hospital =

- U.S. National Register of Historic Places
- U.S. Historic district – Contributing property
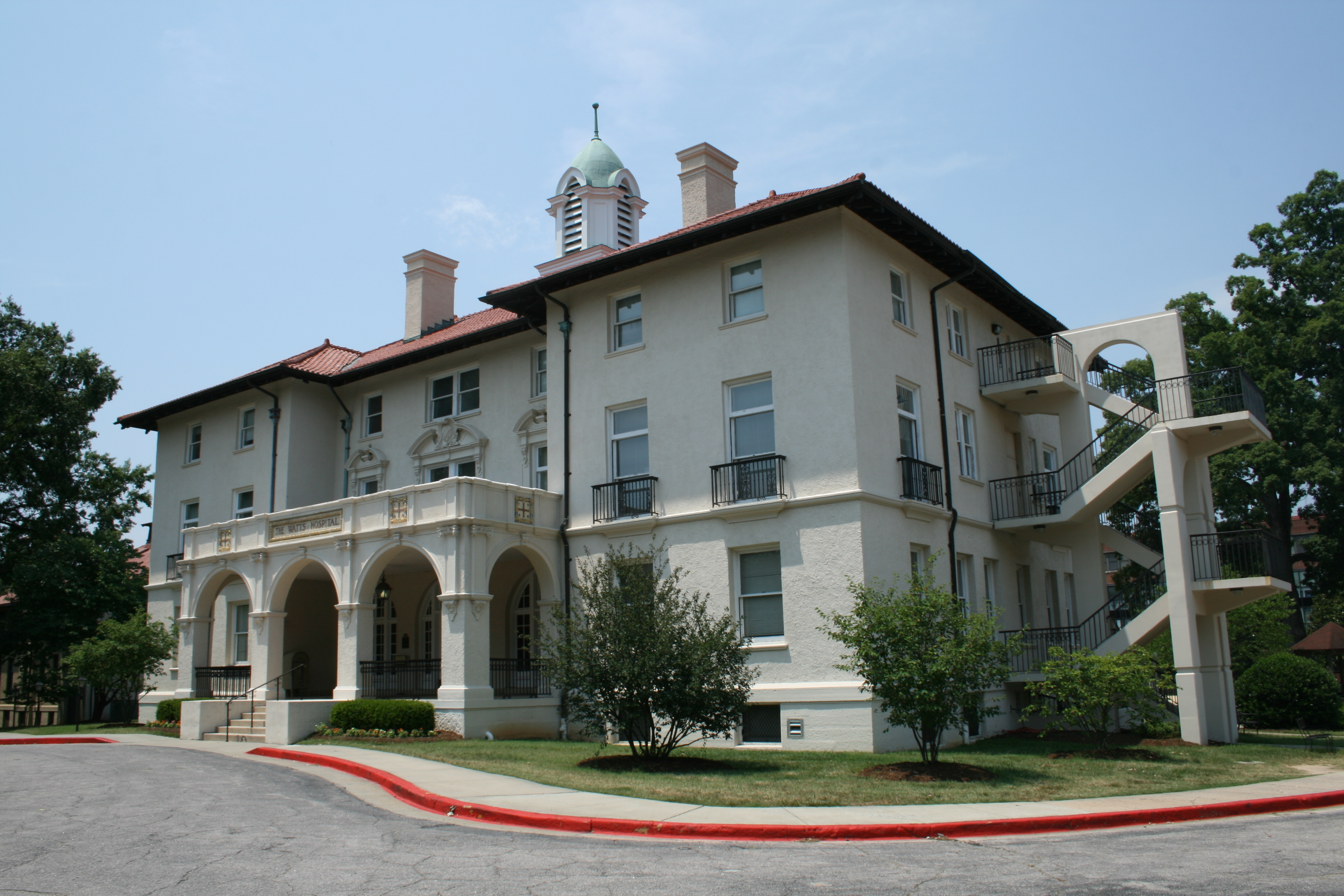

- Location within North Carolina Location within the United States
- Location: Broad St. and Club Blvd., Durham, North Carolina
- Coordinates: 36°1′7.094″N 78°55′12.352″W
- Area: 27 acres (11 ha)
- Built: 1908-1909
- Architectural style: Mission/Spanish Revival
- NRHP reference No.: 80002824
- Added to NRHP: April 2, 1980

Watts Hospital, located in Durham, North Carolina was the city's first hospital, operating between 1895 and 1976.

The hospital opened in 1895, funded entirely by George W. Watts, as a private, 22-bed, modern hospital dedicated to the care of Durham's white citizens and offered free care to those unable to pay. The hospital became public in 1953 and closed 1976, when Durham County General Hospital opened. The grounds and buildings of the hospital's 1909 campus were converted to become the North Carolina School of Science and Mathematics, which began classes in 1980.

== History ==
The original Watts Hospital was established in 1895, on land donated by George Watts, with an endowment of $50,000, provided solely by Watts. The land fronted on West Main Street with Guess Road (later renamed Buchanan Blvd.) to the west and Watts Street to the east. By 1909, the 22-bed hospital was insufficient for the explosive growth of Durham, and new, larger facility was built on 25 acres (10.1 ha) at the intersection of Club Boulevard and Broad Street, where the hospital remained until it closed in 1976. Watts donated another $500,000 for the new hospital site, designed by Boston architect Bertrand E. Taylor in the Spanish Mission style. The hospital was enlarged in 1926 with the Valinda Beale Watts Pavilion, designed by the local architectural firm of Atwood and Nash.

By the early 1960s, Watts had begun admitting black patients on a limited basis, constrained by its small size. A 1966 referendum to fund a new, larger and integrated Watts Hospital was defeated by Durham voters, opposed by both whites and blacks, who feared that the new hospital would cater to whites, while blacks would be treated in the outmoded 1909 facility.

A second referendum, in 1968, which more clearly delineated that Watts and Lincoln hospitals would become extended care facilities when the new Durham County General Hospital opened its doors in 1976. The referendum passed, though Watts was ultimately closed in favor of an enlarged Lincoln Community Health Center.

In September 1980, the first class of high school students moved into the deserted Watts Hospital buildings as the campus began a new life as the North Carolina School of Science and Mathematics (NCSSM), a boarding school for academically talented students from all over North Carolina. The old Spanish Mission style buildings were restored, while new, architecturally harmonious buildings were added. In one of the Durham's best examples of adaptive reuse, the old Watts Hospital, listed on the National Register of Historic Places in 1980, now thrives as NCSSM and serves to anchor the Watts-Hillandale Historic District which was designated a National Historic Neighborhood District in 1998.

== Legacy ==
=== Duke University ===
By 1922, Watts Hospital's quality of care and its philanthropic mission to provide healthcare to the working poor was so well-regarded that James B. Duke and North Carolina Governor Cameron Morrison proposed the creation of the state's first four-year medical college, Duke University, to educate students in conjunction with clinical services provided at Watts Hospital.

=== Watts School of Nursing ===
In addition to founding the clinical hospital, George Watts also established the Watts Hospital Training School for Nurses at the hospital, in 1895. The school was renamed the Watts School of Nursing (Watts SON) in 1976. Its first graduate, Ethel Clay, received her nursing degree in 1897.

Now part of the Duke University Health System, Watts SON has been housed at Durham Regional Hospital since 1976.

Watts School of Nursing is now located at the Duke Health Interprofessional Education Building in Durham, NC as of summer 2025.

==== Notable alumnae ====
- Ethel Clay Price (1874-1943), nurse and socialite
