= Edward F. Stevens =

American architect

Edward Fletcher Stevens (1860–1946) was an American architect and author. He partnered with Frederick Clare Lee to form Stevens & Lee. The firm designed hospitals in the U.S. and Canada including Hôpital Notre-Dame in Montreal; Ottawa Civic Hospital; St. Joseph's Hospital, Toronto; and portions of the Royal Victoria Hospital, Montreal. They worked in Boston and Toronto from 1912 to 1933.

Stevens graduated with an architecture degree from MIT in 1883. He worked for Allen and Kenway in Boston in 1889 and for McKim, Mead and White in 1890. He partnered with Henry H. Kendall to form Kendall and Stevens (1890–95); Kendall, Taylor, and Stevens (1895–1909) (with Bertrand E. Taylor; Kendall, Stevens, and Lee (1909–12); and formed his own firm Stevens and Lee (1912–33) with Frederick Clare Lee.

Stevens became a member of the province of Quebec Association of Architects in 1914 and a Fellow of the American Institute of Architects in 1923 During World War I he was a civilian specialist with the Army Engineers designing of hospitals abroad. After the war he served on a special committee tasked with revising the design of U.S. Army hospitals. He authored books on institutional design including The American Hospital of the Twentieth Century.

== Partner ==
Frederick Clare Lee studied at Yale University and the Ecole des Beaux-Arts, Paris (1897–1902). He was a partner in the firms Kendall, Stevens, and Lee (1909–12) and Stevens and Lee (1912–33).

== Bibliography ==
- The American Hospital of the Twentieth Century Illustrated Architectural Record Publishing, New York

== Additional sources ==
- Annmarie Adams. "Modernism and Medicine: The Hospitals of Stevens and Lee: 1919–1932" Journal of the Society of Architectural Historians. 58, no. 1 (March, 1999): 42.
- E. F. Stevens, Noted Architect The New York Times 1 March 1946
- Isabelle Gournay and France Vanlaethem Montreal Metropole: 1880–1930 Montreal: Canadian Centre for Architecture and Boréal, 1998.
