= Word board =

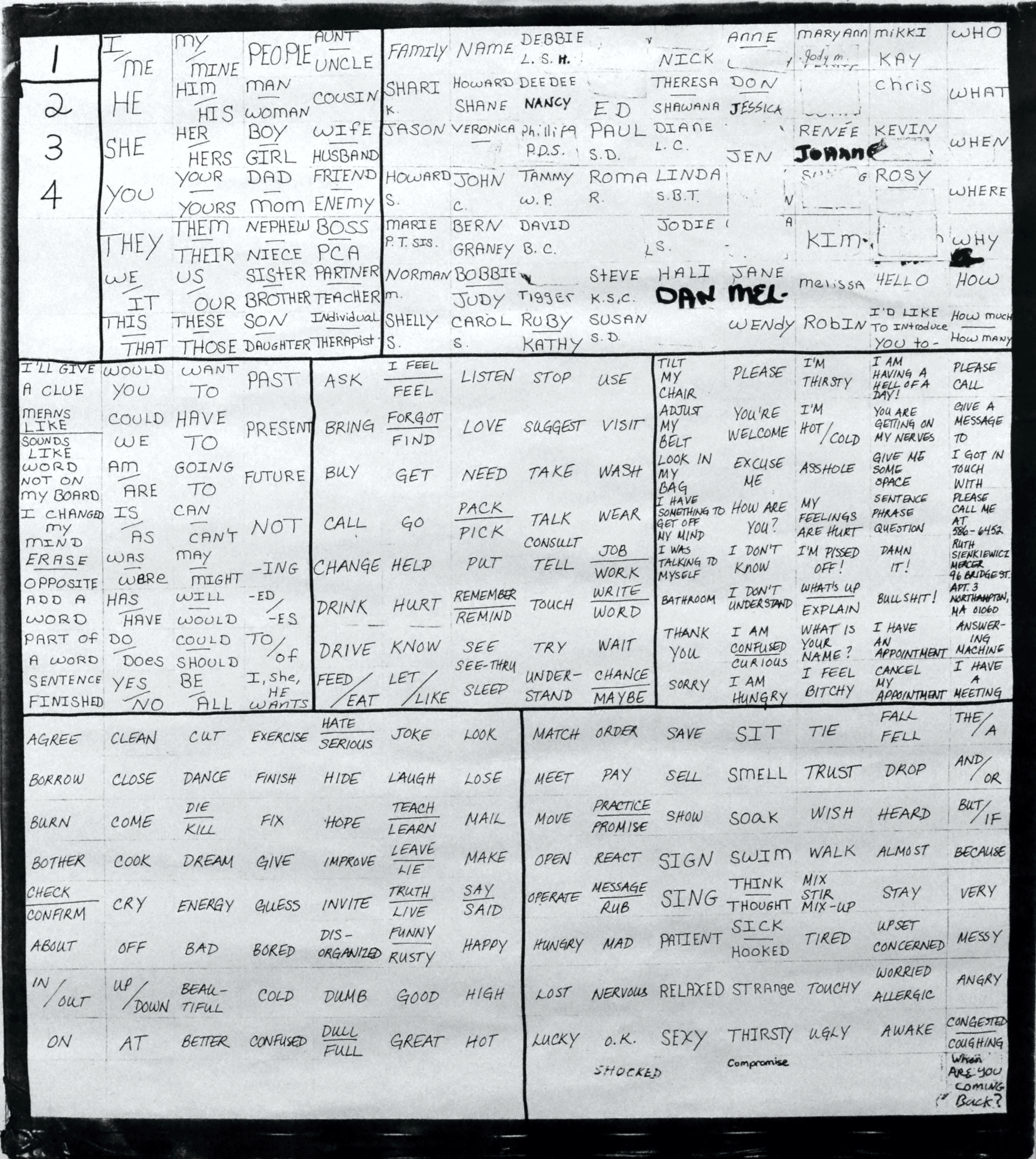
Ruth Sienkiewicz-Mercer, a paraplegic and disability rights advocate, used four wordboards to communicate with her staff, friends and the general public. This is an image of wordboard 1 as it looked in 1998.

A word board or communications board is a simple means to communicate for people who cannot speak. A word board may typically be provided to those recovering after a stroke. To communicate, the user points at the relevant words, letters or symbols on the board.

There are now sophisticated electronic speech synthesis devices available for this purpose.
