= Charles DeWitt Watts =

American surgeon and activist

Dr. Charles DeWitt Watts
- Charles DeWitt Watts
- Born: September 21, 1917; Atlanta, Georgia, U.S.
- Died: July 12, 2004 (aged 86); Durham, North Carolina, U.S.
- Resting place: Beechwood Cemetery, Fayetteville Street, Durham; 35.959°N 78.913°W
- Education: Morehouse College; Howard University College of Medicine
- Occupation: Surgeon
- Years active: 1948–1975 (as a surgeon)
- Notable work: Lincoln Community Health Center
- Spouse: Constance Merrick Watts (1945–2004; his death)
- Children: 4

Charles DeWitt Watts (September 21, 1917 – July 12, 2004) was an African-American surgeon and activist for the poor. Watts was the first surgeon of African-American ancestry in North Carolina. Earning his medical degree in 1943 from Howard University College, he was the first African-American board-certified surgeon to serve in North Carolina. After surgical training at Freedman's Hospital in Washington, D.C., in 1949, he moved to Durham, North Carolina, in 1950 and established a clinic to provide access to medical services for the poor. Breaking the social customs of racial obstacles, he advocated for certification of African-American medical students. He also became a member of many professional colleges including the National Academy of Science's Institute of Medicine and the American College of Surgeons. He served as chief of surgery at Durham's Lincoln Hospital and was later one of the key figures in converting it to the Lincoln Community Health Center, a low-priced clinic for the poor.

== Early life and education ==
Charles DeWitt Watts was born on September 21, 1917, to parents who were church members in Atlanta, Georgia. He was the youngest of four children. His father owned a country store consisting of a butcher shop and a fruit store. The parents taught their children the importance of hard work. Watt's daughter, Constance Eileen Watts Welch, later said: "It was his work with the butcher that taught him the anatomy of animals before formally studying it, when he made steaks and roasts…". Since his father had six sisters who desired to attend college, his father was not able to complete his studies in college; however, he urged his children to attain "academic excellence without excuse".

Watts was selected to attend Atlanta University Laboratory High School, a school created for exceptional students who were college bound, located at Spelman College's campus. He then enrolled at Morehouse College, where he was in his first year when his father died. At that time, he and his brother worked a paper route, delivering copies of the Atlanta Constitution every morning to support their education. Watts was encouraged to attend medical school by his Morehouse College biology teacher, Samuel Nabrit, as he was good at science subjects, especially biology. Watts received a degree in mathematics in 1938 from Morehouse College. After working at the Washington, D.C., post office to support his education, Watts attended Howard University College of Medicine.

== Career ==
Watts received his medical degree in 1943 from Howard University College of Medicine and become the first African American in North Carolina to become a board-certified surgeon. After graduation, he moved to Washington, D.C., and completed surgical training at Freedman's Hospital in 1949, under the tutorship of Charles R. Drew. Drew was credited by Watts for inspiring and encouraging him in his surgical career. Drew was a pioneer of his time for his research on blood and plasma. According to Watts's daughter, "It was because of Dr. Drew's encouragement that he went back to Howard... and went through the surgery training program." Watts noted in an interview with The Washington Post in 1986 that "He [Charles Drew] wanted black doctors to go out and establish themselves around the country".

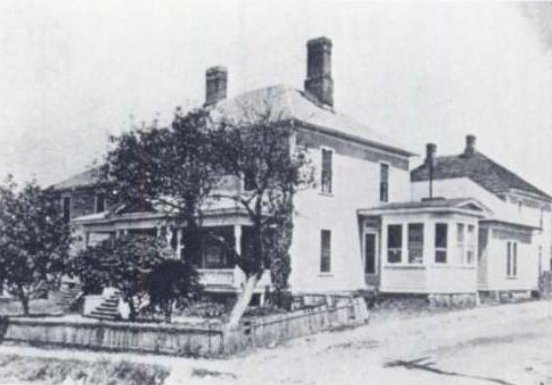
The original Lincoln Hospital, at the northwest corner of Proctor and Cozart streets, circa 1901

Between 1948 and 1950, he worked as a surgery instructor at Howard University.

In 1950, Watts settled in Durham, N.C. with his wife, Constance Merrick Watts, a native of the town. He opened a private clinic in general surgery for poor people and African Americans, as blacks had very limited access to medical services. In 1965, he was the chief of surgery at the Lincoln Hospital, which was one of the city's few hospitals to serve blacks. The hospital consisted of 150 beds. The hospital was also one of the few hospitals in America at that time which allowed African American doctors to perform surgery. While working as chief of surgery Watts also served as a trainer for the hospital's interns. In the 1970s he played a major role in establishing the Lincoln Community Health Center.

In 1975, Watts retired from performing surgery. His daughter said, "I also think he was worried about his dexterity and eyesight."

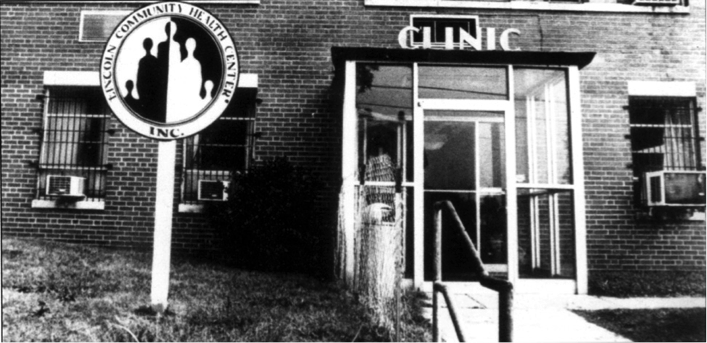
The front entrance of Lincoln Community Health Center

He later become a clinical professor of surgery and director of student health at Duke University Medical School and North Carolina Central University respectively. He also served as a vice president and medical director for 28 years at the North Carolina Mutual Life Insurance Company, an insurance company founded by the grandfathers of Constance Merrick Watts.

He worked throughout his life to serve medical facilities for the poor and help the black communities, breaking the social custom of racial discrimination when he advocated for the certification of black medical students. One of his former students, Charles Johnson, noted that Watts "clearly was a visionary" and added: "He was a very bright, energetic, capable physician and always (was interested in) helping the black community to whatever extent he could".

He served as a member of Howard's board of trustees for 19 years, retiring in 1993.

== Personal life ==
Watts married Constance Merrick Watts in 1945. She was a graduate with a major in economics from Talladega College and a community volunteer. A native of Durham, she attended Palmer Memorial Institute. Constance Eileen Watts, later Constance Eileen Watts Welch, was their first child, born March 28, 1946, at Lincoln Hospital. They later had three more children: two daughters, Deborah Chase Watts Hill and Winifred A. Watts Hemphill and a son, Charles D. Watts, Jr. After attending Hillside High School, Durham, and earning a B. A. degree from Spelman College, Atlanta, Eileen Watts Welch became an academic administrator. Charles DeWitt Watts, Jr. ("Chuck"), graduated from the University of North Carolina in 1977, earned MBA and law degrees, and became a law professor, practicing attorney, and community leader. In 1992, Deborah Watts Hill died of breast cancer. Winifred also obtained her law degree from Howard University. She answered a family calling is now the President of Southview Cemetery in Atlanta; this was started by Dr. Watts Father [Albert Sr] in 1886.

== Death ==
After a career of more than 50 years, Watts died at home aged 86 on July 12, 2004, due to complications from diabetes and heart disease. After a funeral at St. Joseph's AME Church, Fayetteville Street, Durham, he was interred at Beechwood Cemetery, Fayetteville Street, Durham. William Anlyan, former chancellor of Duke University Medical Center for Health affairs, said on hearing of Watts's death: "We grew to be great friends [Watts and Anlyan]. He was a well-trained and gentle surgeon, and he and his family became great assets to entire Durham community".

== Recognition ==
In 2002, Duke Medical School started a scholarship in his name, the Charles Watts Travel Awards, to "assist student and faculty travel to study culturally specific issues." Duke also awarded him an honorary degree.

His collected papers are archived at the Duke University Libraries.
