= Eastern States Exposition =

Annual agricultural fair in western Massachusetts for the six New England states

Coordinates: 42°5′29.1″N 72°37′7.1″W

Eastern States Exposition (The Big E)
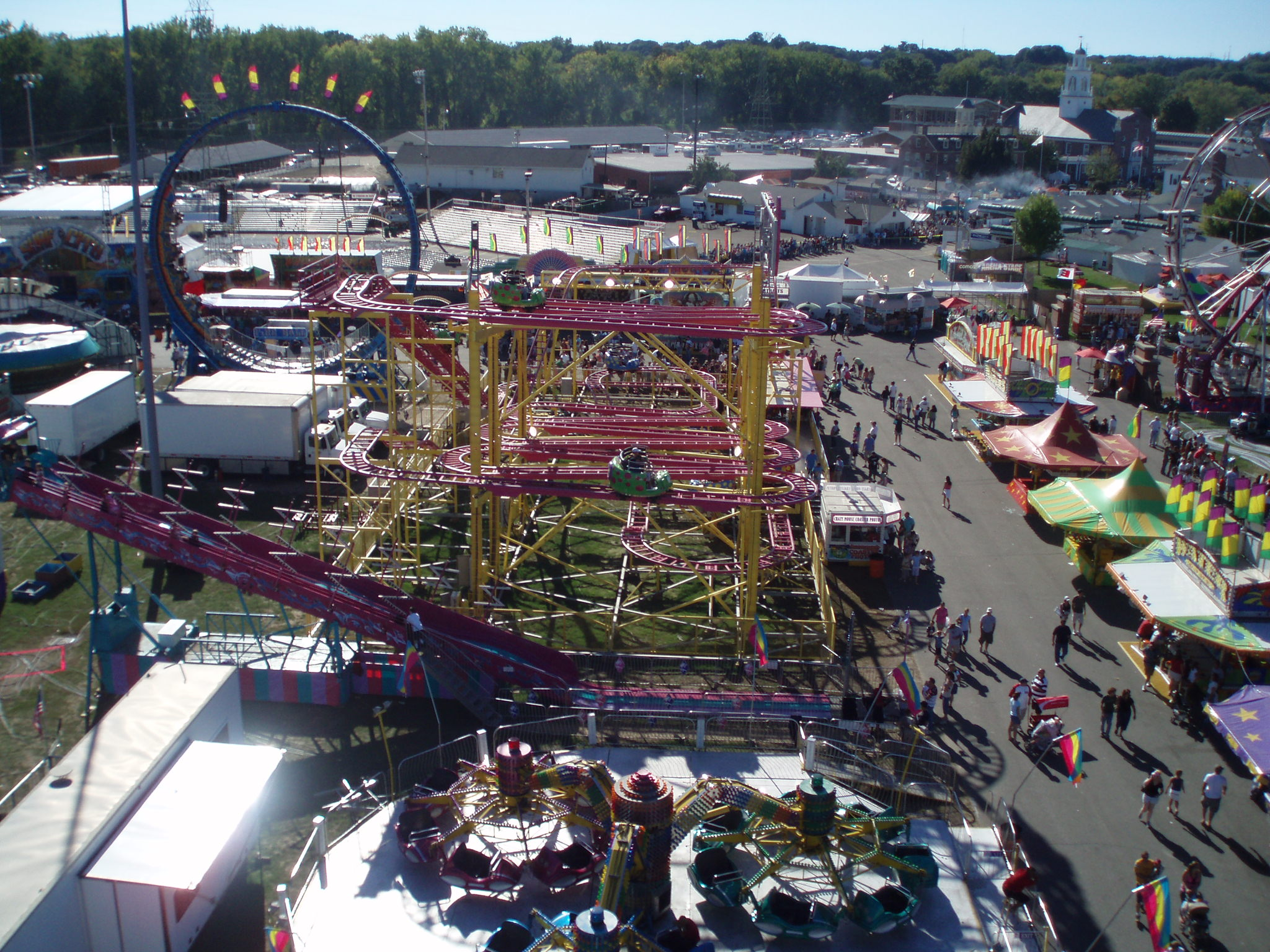
- The Big E in West Springfield, Massachusetts in 2007
- Status: Active
- Genre: Agricultural show
- Begins: Second Friday after Labor Day
- Ends: Seventeen days after it opens
- Frequency: Annual
- Venue: Eastern States Exposition
- Locations: 1305 Memorial Ave. West Springfield, MA 01089
- Inaugurated: 1917
- Founder: Joshua L. Brooks
- Attendance: 1,633,935 (2024)
- Area: New England
- Website: thebige.com

The Eastern States Exposition, branded as The Big E, is an annual fair in West Springfield, Massachusetts. It opens on the second Friday after Labor Day and runs for seventeen days.

It is billed as "New England's Great State Fair", the largest agricultural event on the eastern seaboard and the fifth-largest fair in the nation. The Big E is inclusive of all six New England states: Connecticut, Maine, Massachusetts, New Hampshire, Rhode Island, and Vermont.

== History ==
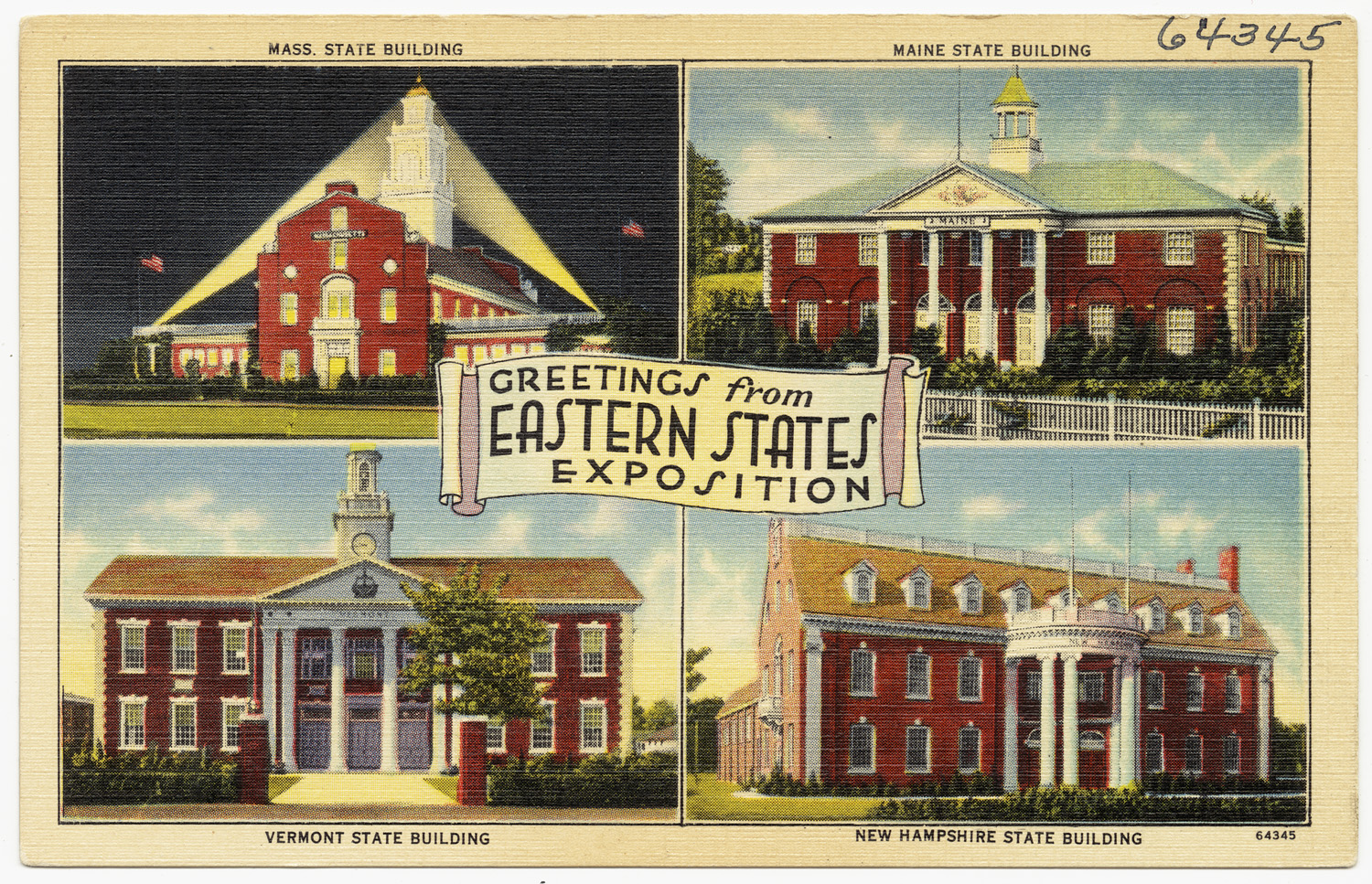
The fair promoted on a period post card, c. 1930–1945

The first Eastern States Exposition occurred in October 1916 in West Springfield, Massachusetts, and was called the Eastern States Agricultural and Industrial Exposition. All six New England states, plus Delaware, New Jersey, New York, and Pennsylvania, participated. Joshua L. Brooks conceived it to help promote agriculture and educate young people with the skills and knowledge needed in agricultural vocations. The Exposition featured displays of innovations in the industry and held contests designed to encourage farmers to better themselves through competition.

The Boys & Girls Clubs of America partnered with the Exposition to organize youth competitions, in which prizes were awarded for best produce, jams, breads, raised hens, planting techniques, and other categories. The youth component drew competitors from all ten participating states and was deemed "a triumph in a new type of education". An eight-day camp program was established at Springfield's Camp Vail for all youths who placed first or second in judged competitions.

The ten-state format continued into the 1920s, with the month of the Exposition moving to September. According to officials, the "Eastern States movement" aimed to make the ten states "more nearly self-supporting food-wise and possess a large, prosperous and contented farming population". Emphasis on the development of young farmers continued with the establishment of "Baby Beef Clubs" in 1920 to help youths buy, raise, exhibit, and sell livestock at the event.

Newspaper ad for the Eastern States Exposition, 1938

The exposition grew beyond agriculture and industry within its first few years. In 1923, the Massachusetts Department of Health built a model schoolhouse on the fairgrounds, offering free medical and dental examinations. The rise of the eugenics movement in the 1920s led to the inclusion of "Fitter Family" contests, in which prizes were awarded to individuals and families based on appearance and ethnic background. Exhibits on Native American culture were added, including a tipi exhibit hosted by Reginald and Gladys Laubin in 1926. Entertainment elements were added by the 1930s, including demonstrations of "automobile polo" (featuring acrobats playing polo while driving Ford cars) and competitive performances by high school bands.

By 1940, the exposition had focused more on the six New England states. At that year's horse show in West Springfield, competitors from Delaware, New Jersey, and New York were placed in the open classes instead of the New England division.

In 1966, for its fiftieth anniversary, the fair began marketing itself as "The Big E". The "E" stands for what organizers said was an emphasis on "entertainment, education and excitement".

Since the first fair, only World War I and World War II, during which the military requisitioned the grounds as storage depots, and the COVID-19 pandemic have interrupted the annual tradition.

== Attractions ==
=== Avenue of States ===
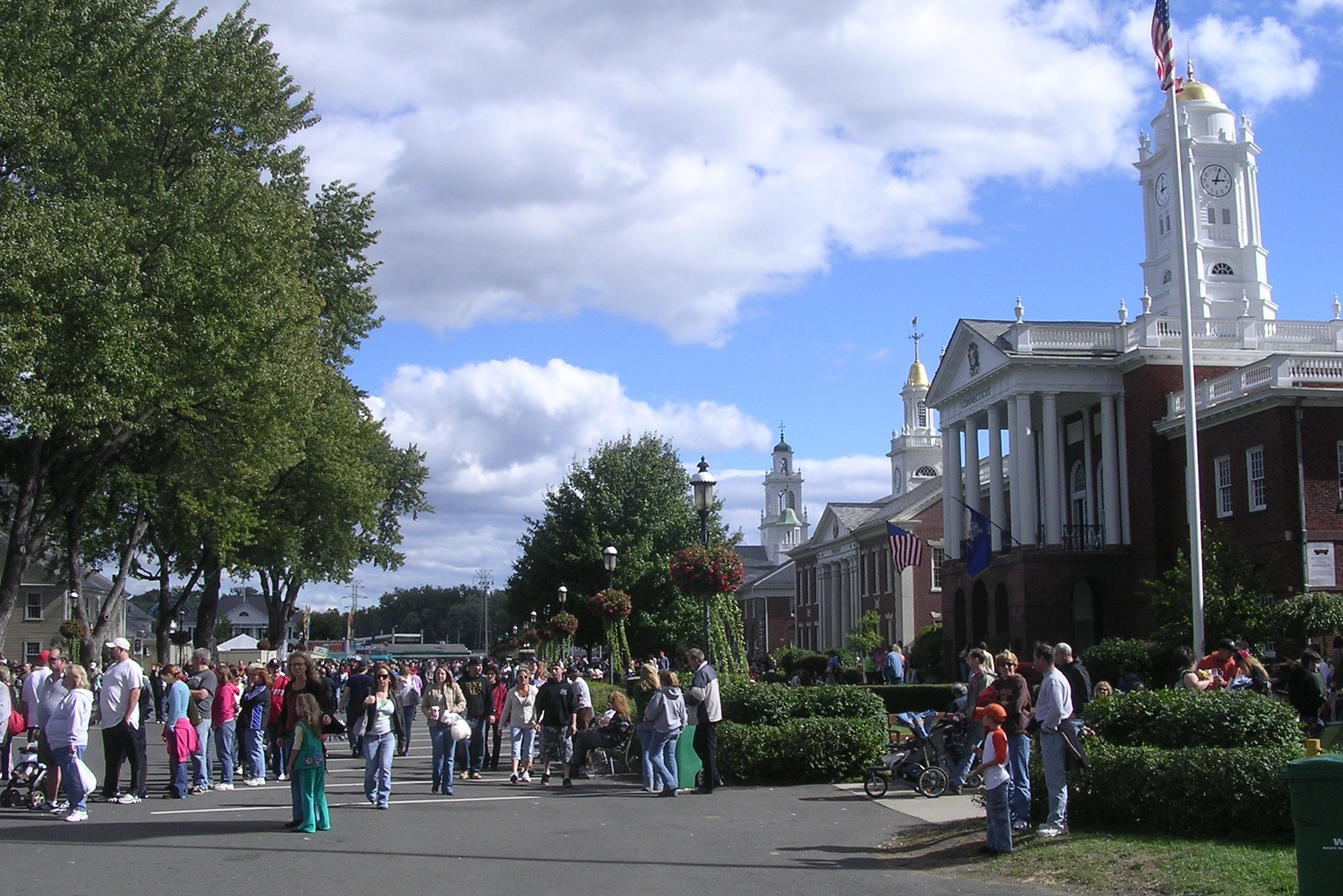
Avenue of States

The Avenue of States contains life-size replicas of the six original New England statehouses, as well as the New England Grange House. In actuality, the state houses are not replicas but rather modeled after original state houses in most instances. The buildings for New Hampshire and Vermont bear no resemblance to their original state houses.

These buildings feature exhibits and vendors that exemplify the heritage, food, and traditions of each state as a way of promoting tourism. For example, the Maine House in past years has offered lobster, blueberries, and baked potatoes, while the Vermont House has Ben and Jerry's ice cream, maple syrup, and Cabot cheese. Vendors also sell locally made products and handicrafts. The Maine baked potatoes have become an icon, with buyers regularly joining long lines during the fair's busier periods. The Connecticut building features watches from Timex, which was founded there, as well as Lego, which has its US headquarters there. The Rhode Island building features Del's Lemonade and Blount Seafood Clamcakes and Chowder, as well as books from Rhode Island author C. M. Eddy, Jr., who has links back to H. P. Lovecraft and Houdini in Rhode Island.

=== Livestock and animals ===
The Big E remains true to its agricultural roots today, with more than 7,100 4-H and FFA participants and 1,100 open-show exhibitors, as well as educational displays and attractions.

In keeping with the fair's agricultural roots, there are many livestock displays at The Big E. The Big E Coliseum features daily horse shows, while the Mallary Complex houses livestock and other farm animals, including goats, chickens, pigs, and sheep.

Other animals, such as those found at petting zoos or in The Big E Circus Spectacular, are also featured at The Big E. There are also many 4-H youth livestock shows and a sale of the 4-H steers.

=== Food ===
Many foods representing New England cuisine can be found at The Big E, along with traditional fair foods like fried dough, corn dogs, and lemonade. Aside from the state houses, food sellers can be found throughout the main vendor areas and around the perimeter of the fairgrounds.

Since 2000, The Big E has endeavored to introduce its own signature foods. This began in 2002 when The Big E introduced Big E Cream Puffs, which it intended to be the signature dessert of the Fair. The Big E features the cream puffs in some of its advertising; in addition, the cream puffs have been featured on local and national TV shows, including Live! with Regis and Kelly. This was followed by the introduction in 2004 of "The Big (Chocolate) Eclairs" and, in 2006, of Big E Chocolate Chip Cookies, made with Ghirardelli chocolate. In 2009, they introduced the "Craz-E Burger", which is a bacon cheeseburger on a glazed donut rather than a bun.

=== Vendors ===
Small shops are a primary attraction of The Big E. Vendors can be found across most of the fairgrounds, selling items ranging from state-specific trinkets and regional memorabilia to household goods, clothing, and accessories. Many vendors set up shops selling the same goods in multiple areas of the fair in order to attract as many customers as possible.

The Better Living Center is the largest vendor area, featuring household wares, home improvement services, cookware, and health supplements. The International Building is home to vendors selling items from other cultures, in particular those with a common connection with many New Englanders, in particular Irish and Italian imported goods.

=== Other attractions ===
- Storrowton Village, where fairgoers can experience New England life from the 19th century.
- The Midway, home to carnival rides and games, is operated by North American Midway Entertainment. The Giant Slide is 46 feet high and 135 feet long. It was originally erected near Gate 5 in 1969 but moved to its current spot behind the Better Living Center in 1983.
- The Eastern States Coliseum, more colloquially known as the "Big E Coliseum", is an arena on the grounds where numerous equestrian contests and other special events are held. The building was formerly a professional ice hockey venue.

== Other uses ==
The fairgrounds are used for other events throughout the year, including:

- Amherst Railway Society Railroad Hobby Show
- Equine Affaire
- Northeastern Poultry Congress
- Society of Manufacturing Engineers EASTEC exposition
- Springfield RV Camping & Outdoor Show
- Springfield Sportsmen's Show
- Wedding & Bridal Expo

In January 2013, the Exposition joined with Hard Rock International in a proposal to build a casino and hotel on 40 acres of the fairground in a bid for the single casino license available in Western Massachusetts. In a town referendum on September 10, the voters of West Springfield voted the project down.
