= Duke Regional Hospital =

Coordinates: 36°2′12.36″N 78°54′0.58″W

Geography
- Location: 3643 N Roxboro St. Durham, 27704, North Carolina, United States

Organization
- Care system: Public/Private
- Type: General
- Affiliated university: Duke University Health System, Watts School of Nursing

Services
- Emergency department: Not a Trauma Center
- Beds: 388 Licensed Beds

History
- Opened: 1976

Links
- Website: http://www.dukeregional.org/
- Lists: Hospitals in North Carolina

Duke Regional Hospital (DRH), located in northern Durham, North Carolina is a general-services hospital that has been part of the Duke University Health System since 1998. The hospital has 388 beds and over 500 physicians on the medical staff, and has a certified Level II Intensive Care Nursery.

== History ==
The hospital opened to patients on October 3, 1976, as Durham County General Hospital, replacing the smaller Lincoln and Watts Hospitals, which closed on the same date.

In 1998, an agreement with Duke University Health System was signed and the two officially began a 20-year partnership.

On July 1, 2013, Durham Regional Hospital was renamed Duke Regional Hospital as part of a marketing plan to rebrand its image.

It is not a publicly funded hospital.
