= Bertrand E. Taylor =

Bertrand E. Taylor (1856 – August, 1909) was an American architect who worked in Massachusetts. He designed the Watts Hospital (1895) and later hospital buildings at the same site.

Taylor partnered in firms with Henry H. Kendall and Edward F. Stevens.

His work includes the New Hampshire State Hospital for the Insane, Westboro State Hospital, Massachusetts Hospital for Epileptics, Worcester Insane Asylum, Wrentham State School, Boston City Hospital, Corey Hill Hospital, Massachusetts Homeopathic HOspital, Newton Hospital, Anna Jaques Hospital at Newburryport, Hitchcock Hospital at Hanover, New Hampshire, Merritt Hospital at Oakland California, and buildings at Northfield for Dwiht L. Moody. He was a draughtsman for George D. Rand. He designed alterations of Hotel Vendome. Helped design parts of model village at Pinehurst, North Carolina. Associate of the American Institute of Architects in 1905, fellow of the Boston Society of Architects and a charter member of the Boston Architectural Club.

He lived much of his life in Newton Centre and died there on August 23, 1909.
