= George D. Rand =

American architect

George Dutton Rand (24 May 1833 – 2 November 1910) was an American architect. He was a partnered with Frank W. Weston to form Weston & Rand, until Weston returned to England upon his mother's death. George D. Rand lived part of his life in Auburndale, Massachusetts. He designed his own New Hampshire bungalow.

Rand was also one of the first major architects to work on designs of buildings for Rollins College.

Rand was born in Coventry, Vermont on May 24, 1833. He was educated in Brownington and St. Johnsbury. He worked on a newspaper in Johnsbury and later became editor of the Caledonian. He studied architecture and worked in Hartford, Connecticut. In 1881 he partnered with Bertrand E. Taylor. He is known for Queen Anne styling including steeply pitched rooflines and turned columns.

== Work ==
At Rollins College he designed Knowles Hall (1886), Pinehurst Cottage (1886), Lakeside Cottage (1886), and Lyman Gymnasium (1890).

- Samuel S. Sewall House in Bath, Maine
