= List of boys' schools in the United States =

Here are lists of schools which only admit boys, in the United States

== Arizona ==
- Brophy College Preparatory, Phoenix (9-12)

== Arkansas ==
- Catholic High School for Boys, Little Rock (9-12)
- Subiaco Academy, Subiaco (7-12)

== California ==
- Jesuit High School, Carmichael (9-12)
- St. Augustine High School, San Diego (9-12)

Los Angeles area

- Boys Academic Leadership Academy, Westmont (6-12)
- Cathedral High School , Los Angeles (9-12)
- Crespi Carmelite High School, Los Angeles (9-12)
- Damien High School, La Verne (9-12)
- Don Bosco Technical Institute, Rosemead (9-12)
- Loyola High School, Los Angeles (9-12)
- Salesian High School, Los Angeles (9-12)
- Saint Francis High School, La Cañada Flintridge (9-12)
- Servite High School, Anaheim (9-12)
- St. John Bosco High School, Bellflower (9-12)
- St. Michael's Preparatory School (Silverado)
- Verbum Dei High School, Los Angeles (9-12)
- YULA Boys High School, Los Angeles (9-12)

San Francisco/Bay area

- Bellarmine College Preparatory, San Jose (9-12)
- Cathedral School for Boys, San Francisco (K-8)
- De La Salle High School, Concord (9-12)
- Junípero Serra High School, San Mateo (9-12)
- Stuart Hall High School, San Francisco (9-12)
- Town School for Boys, San Francisco (K-8)

Former

- Archbishop Riordan High School, San Francisco (became co-ed in 2020)
- St. Michael's Preparatory School, Silverado (1961-2020)

== Connecticut ==
- Avon Old Farms School, Avon (9-12)
- Brunswick School, Greenwich (PK-12)
- Fairfield College Preparatory School, Fairfield (9-12)
- Fairfield Country Day School, Fairfield (K-9)
- Salisbury School, Salisbury (9-12)
- South Kent School, South Kent (9-12)
- Xavier High School, Middletown (9-12)

Former

- Notre Dame High School, West Haven became co-ed in 2025

== Delaware ==
Wilmington

- St. Edmond's Academy (PK-8)
- Salesianum School (9-12)

== District of Columbia (Washington, D.C.) ==
- Gonzaga College High School (9-12)
- St. Anselm's Abbey School (6-12)
- St. Albans School (4-12)

== Florida ==
- Jesuit High School, Tampa (9-12)

Miami area

- Belen Jesuit Preparatory School, Tamiami (6-12)
- Christopher Columbus High School, Westchester CDP (9-12)
- Klurman Elementary School/Rohr Middle School/Dr. Abe Chames High School, North Miami Beach (1-12)
- Menachem Mendel Elementary/Middle School/Klurman Yeshiva High School, Miami (PK-12)
- Mechina of South Florida, Miami Beach (7-12)
- Young Men's Preparatory Academy, Miami (6-12)

== Georgia ==
- The B.E.S.T. Academy, Atlanta (6-12)
- Benedictine Military School, Savannah (9-12)

Pinecrest Academy (Cumming) puts boys and girls in separate classes.

Former

- Ivy Preparatory Young Men's Leadership Academy, Atlanta (closed 2016)

== Hawaii ==
- St. Andrew's Prep, Honolulu (K-5)
- Saint Louis School, Honolulu (K-12)

== Illinois ==
- Brother Rice High School, Chicago (9-12)
- Fasman Yeshiva High School, Skokie (9-12)
- Leo Catholic High School, Chicago (9-12)
- Marmion Academy, Aurora (9-12)
- Mount Carmel High School, Chicago (9-12)
- Northridge Preparatory School, Niles (6-12)
- Notre Dame College Prep, Niles (9-12)
- St. Patrick High School, Chicago (9-12)
- St. Rita of Cascia High School, Chicago (9-12)
- Urban Prep Charter Academy for Young Men - Bronzville Campus, Chicago (9-12)
- Urban Prep Charter Academy for Young Men - Englewood Campus, Chicago (9-12)
- Urban Prep Charter Academy for Young Men - West Campus, Chicago (9-12)

Former

- Cathedral High School, Belleville merged with the Academy of Notre dame to become Althoff Catholic High School in 1964
- Chaddock Boys' School, Quincy
- Hales Franciscan High School, Chicago (closed 2019)
- Holy Cross High School, River Grove (1961-2004)
- Holy Trinity High School, Chicago (became co-ed)
- Joliet Catholic High School, Joliet merged with St. Francis Academy to become Joliet Catholic Academy in 1990
- Loyola Academy, Wilmette merged with Saint Louise de Marillac High School in 1994
- Roncalli High School, Aurora merged with Madonna Catholic High School to become Aurora Central Catholic High School in 1968
- St. Ignatius College Prep, Chicago (became co-ed in 1979)
- St. Joseph High School, Westchester (became co-ed in 2005, closed in 2021)
- St. Laurence High School, Burbank (became co-ed in 2017)
- St. Mel High School, Chicago merged with Providence High School to become Providence St. Mel School in 1969
- St. Procopius College and Academy, Lisle merged with Sacred Heart Academy to become Benet Academy in 1967
- Weber High School, Chicago (1890-1999)

== Indiana ==
- Sacred Heart Apostolic School, Rolling Prairie (8-12)

Former

- Gibault School for Boys, Terre Haute

== Kentucky ==
- Covington Catholic High School, Park Hills (9-12)

Louisville

- DeSales High School (9-12)
- St. Xavier High School (9-12)
- Trinity High School (9-12)

Former

- Bishop David High School, Louisville merged with Angela Merici High School to become Holy Cross High School in 1984
- Flaget High School, Louisville merged with Loretto High School in 1973 and closed in 1974
- Newport Catholic High School, Newport merged with Our Lady of Providence Academy to become Newport Central Catholic High School in 1983

== Louisiana ==
- Berchmans Academy of the Sacred Heart, Grand Coteau (PK-12)
- Catholic High School, Baton Rouge (8-12)

New Orleans area

- Archbishop Rummel High School, Metairie (8-12)
- Archbishop Shaw High School, Marrero (8-12)
- Brother Martin High School, New Orleans (8-12)
- Christian Brothers School, New Orleans (co-ed PK-4, all-boys 5-7)
- Holy Cross School, New Orleans (PK-12)
- Jesuit High School, New Orleans (8-12)
- St. Augustine High School, New Orleans (8-12)
- St. Paul's School, Covington (8-12)

Former

- Alcee Fortier High School, New Orleans became co-ed and then closed in 2006
- De La Salle High School, New Orleans became co-ed in 1992
- East Jefferson High School, Metairie became co-ed in 1980
- Miller-McCoy Academy, New Orleans (2008-2015)

== Maine ==
Former

- Farmington Academy, Farmington (1812-1863)

== Maryland ==
Baltimore area

- Archbishop Curley High School, Baltimore (9-12)
- Boys' Latin School of Maryland, Baltimore (K-12)
- Calvert Hall College High School, Towson (9-12)
- Gilman School, Baltimore (PK-12)
- Loyola Blakefield, Towson (6-12)
- Mount Saint Joseph High School, Baltimore (9-12)
- St. Paul's School for Boys, Brooklandville (co-ed PK-5, all-boys 5-12)

Washington, DC area

- The Avalon School, Wheaton (K-12)
- DeMatha Catholic High School, Hyattsville (9-12)
- Georgetown Preparatory School, Rockville (9-12)
- The Heights School, Potomac (3-12)
- Landon School, Bethesda (3-12)
- Mater Dei School, Bethesda (1-8)

Former

- Bishop McNamara High School, Forestville CDP became co-ed in 1992
- Cardinal Gibbons School, Baltimore (1962-2010)
- Eshkol Academy, Columbia (2002-2004)
- St. Timothy's Hall, Catonsville (1847-1864)
- Tome School for Boys, North East (became co-ed)

== Massachusetts ==
- Belmont Hill School, Belmont (7-12)
- Boston College High School, Boston (7-12)
- Catholic Memorial School, West Roxbury (7-12)
- Eaglebrook School, Deerfield (6-9)
- Roxbury Latin School, West Roxbury (7-12)
- Saint John's High School, Shrewsbury (7-12)
- St. John's Preparatory School, Danvers (6-12)
- St. Paul's Choir School, Cambridge (5-8)
- Saint Sebastian's School, Needham (7-12)
- Xaverian Brothers High School, Westwood (7-12)

Former

- Boston Latin School, Boston became co-ed in 1972
- Central Catholic High School, Lawrence became co-ed in 1996
- Don Bosco Technical High School, Boston (1946-1998)
- The English High School, Boston became co-ed in 1972
- Lenox School for Boys, Lenox (1926-1972)
- Linden Hill School, Northfield (1961-2012)
- The Newman School, Boston became co-ed
- Round Hill School, Northampton (1823-1834)

== Michigan ==
- Brother Rice High School, Bloomfield Township (9-12)
- De La Salle Collegiate High School, Warren (9-12)
- Detroit Catholic Central High School, Novi (9-12)
- Douglass Academy for Young Men, Detroit (9-12)
- Loyola High School, Detroit (9-12)
- University of Detroit Jesuit High School and Academy, Detroit (7-12)

Former

- Austin Catholic Preparatory School, Detroit (1951-1978)
- Notre Dame High School, Harper Woods (1954-2005)
- St. Augustine Seminary High School, Holland (1949-1977)
- St. Mary's Preparatory, Orchard Lake Village became co-ed in 2020

== Minnesota ==
- Saint Thomas Academy, Mendota Heights (6-12)

== Mississippi ==
- Saint Stanislaus College, Bay St. Louis (7-12)

== Missouri ==
- Missouri Military Academy, Mexico (7-12)
- Rockhurst High School, Kansas City (9-12)

St. Louis Area

- Chaminade College Preparatory School, Creve Coeur (6-12)
- Christian Brothers College High School, Town and Country (9-12)
- De Smet Jesuit High School, Creve Coeur (9-12)
- St. John Vianney High School, Kirkwood (9-12)
- Saint Louis Priory School, Creve Coeur (6-12)
- St. Louis University High School, St. Louis (9-12)
- St. Mary's High School, St. Louis (9-12)

== Nebraska ==
- Creighton Preparatory School, Omaha (9-12)
- Mount Michael Benedictine School, Elkhorn (9-12)

Former

- Father Flanagan's Boys' Home, Boys Town

== New Hampshire ==
- Cardigan Mountain School, Canaan (6-9)

Former

- Immaculate Conception Apostolic School, Center Harbor (1982-2015)
- Pinkerton Academy, Derry became co-ed in 1817

== New Jersey ==
- Christian Brothers Academy, Lincroft (9-12)
- Princeton Academy of the Sacred Heart, Princeton (PK-8)
- St. Augustine Preparatory School, Richland (8-12)

New York City area

- Bergen Catholic High School, Oradell (9-12)
- Delbarton School, Morristown (7-12)
- Don Bosco Preparatory High School, Ramsey (9-12)
- Eagle Academy for Young Men of Newark, Newark (5-12)
- Oratory Preparatory School, Summit (7-12)
- Rav Teitz Mesivta Academy, Elizabeth (6-12)
- St. Benedict's Preparatory School, Newark (K-12)
- St. Joseph High School, Metuchen (9-12)
- Saint Joseph Regional High School, Montvale (9-12)
- St. Peter's Preparatory School, Jersey City (9-12)
- Seton Hall Preparatory School, West Orange (9-12)
- Torah Academy of Bergen County, Teaneck (9-12)

Former

- American Boychoir School, Princeton (1937-2017)
- Hudson Catholic Regional High School, Jersey City became co-ed in 2009
- Neumann Preparatory School, Wayne (1965-1990)
- Thomas Jefferson High School merged with Battin High School to become Elizabeth High School in 1977

== New York ==
New York City

Bronx

- Cardinal Hayes High School (9-12)
- Eagle Academy for Young Men of the Bronx (6-12)
- Fordham Preparatory School (9-12)
- Mount Saint Michael Academy (6-12)
- Boys Prep Bronx Elementary (K-8)
- St. Raymond High School for Boys (9-12)

Brooklyn

- Eagle Academy at Ocean Hill (6-12)
- Mesivta Nesivos Hatalmud (8-12)
- Uncommon Excellence Boys Elementary/Middle School (K-8)
- United Lubavitcher Yeshiva
- Yeshiva Derech HaTorah (K-12)
- Yeshiva Rabbi Chaim Berlin (PK-12)
- Yeshiva Tiferes Yisroel (PK-12)
- Yeshiva Torah Temimah (PK-12)
- Yeshiva Toras Emes Kaminetz (K-12)
- Yeshivat Shaare Torah Boys High School (9-12)

Manhattan

- Browning School (K-12)
- Buckley School (K-9)
- Collegiate School (K-12)
- Eagle Academy for Young Men of Harlem (6-12)
- La Salle Academy (9-12)
- Mesivtha Tifereth Jerusalem (9-12)
- Regis High School (9-12)
- St. Bernard's School (K-9)
- Saint David's School, PK-8
- Saint Thomas Choir School (3-8)
- Xavier High School (9-12)
- Yeshiva University High School for Boys (9-12)

Queens

- Cathedral Preparatory School and Seminary (9-12)
- Eagle Academy for Young Men of Southeast Queens (6-12)
- Mesivta Yesodei Yeshurun
- Yeshiva Darchei Torah (PK-12)
- Yeshiva of Far Rockaway (9-12)
- Yeshiva Shaar HaTorah (9-12)

Staten Island

- Eagle Academy for Young Men of Staten Island (6-12)
- Monsignor Farrell High School (9-12)
- St. Peter's Boys High School (9-12)
- Yeshiva of Staten Island

Former

- All Hallows High School, Bronx (1909-2025)
- Boys High School, Brooklyn merged with Girls' High School to become Boys and Girls High School in 1975
- Brooklyn Preparatory School, Brooklyn (1908-1972)
- Holy Cross High School, Queens became co-ed in 2018
- Loyola School, Manhattan became co-ed in 1973
- Monsignor McClancy Memorial High School, Queens became co-ed in 2012
- Power Memorial Academy, Manhattan (1931-1984)
- Rice High School, Manhattan (1938-2011)
- St. Agnes Boys High School, Manhattan (1914-2013)
- St. Francis Preparatory School, Queens became co-ed in 1974
- Xaverian High School, Brooklyn became co-ed in 2016
- Yeshiva Toras Chaim

New York State

- Albany Academy, Albany (PK-12)
- Christian Brothers Academy, Albany (5-12)
- McQuaid Jesuit High School, Rochester (6-12)

Buffalo area

- Bishop Timon – St. Jude High School, Buffalo (9-12)
- Canisius High School, Buffalo (9-12)
- Saint Francis High School, Athol Springs
- St. Joseph's Collegiate Institute, Tonawanda (9-12)

Hudson Valley

- Archbishop Stepinac High School, White Plains
- Iona Preparatory School, New Rochelle (K-12)
- Mesivta Ohel Torah, Monsey (9-12)
- Salesian High School, New Rochelle (9-12)
- Trinity-Pawling School, Pawling (7-12)

Long Island

- Chaminade High School, Mineola (9-12)
- Davis Renov Stahler Yeshiva High School for Boys, Woodmere (9-12)
- Rambam Mesivta (9-12)
- Yeshiva of South Shore

Former

- La Salle Institute, Troy became co-ed in 2021
- New York Military Academy, Cornwall became co-ed in 1975

== North Carolina ==
- Christ School, Arden (8-12)

== Ohio ==
- Dayton Boys Preparatory Academy, Dayton
- Grand River Academy, Austinburg (9-12)
- Saint Charles Preparatory School, Columbus (9-12)

Cincinnati area

- Elder High School, Cincinnati (9-12)
- La Salle High School, Cincinnati (9-12)
- Moeller High School, Cincinnati (9-12)
- St. Xavier High School, Cincinnati (9-12)

Cleveland area

- Benedictine High School, Cleveland (9-12)
- Ginn Academy, Cleveland (9-12)
- St. Edward High School, Lakewood (9-12)
- Saint Ignatius High School, Cleveland (9-12)
- University School, Hunting Valley (PK-12)

Toledo

- St. Francis de Sales High School (7-12)
- St. John's Jesuit High School and Academy (6-12)

Former

- Cathedral Latin School, Chardon merged with Notre Dame Academy to become Notre Dame-Cathedral Latin School in 1988
- St. Joseph High School, Cleveland merged with Villa Angela Academy to become Villa Angela-St. Joseph High School in 1990

== Pennsylvania ==
- Central Catholic High School, Pittsburgh (9-12)

Philadelphia area

- Boys' Latin of Philadelphia Charter School, Philadelphia (6-12)
- Church Farm School, Exton (9-12)
- Devon Preparatory School, Tredyffrin Township (6-12)
- Father Judge High School, Philadelphia (9-12)
- Haverford School, Haverford (PK-12)
- Holy Ghost Preparatory School, Bensalem (9-12)
- La Salle College High School, Wyndmoor (9-12)
- Malvern Preparatory School, Malvern (6-12)
- The Phelps School, Malvern (6-12)
- Roman Catholic High School, Philadelphia (9-12)
- Saint Joseph's Preparatory School, Philadelphia (9-12)

Former

Became co-ed

- Cathedral Preparatory School, Erie became co-ed in 2022
- Central High School, Philadelphia became co-ed in 1975
- The Hill School, Pottstown became co-ed in 1998
- Milton Hershey School, Hershey became co-ed in 1976
- North Catholic High School, Pittsburgh became co-ed in 1973
- The Kiski School, (Saltsburg, Pennsylvania)|
- The Kiski School, Saltsburg (9-12) became coed in 2024

- Scranton Preparatory School, Scranton (9-12) became co-ed in 1971

Merged

- Monsignor Bonner High School, Drexel Hill merged with Archbishop Prendergast High School to become Monsignor Bonner and Archbishop Prendergast High School in 2012
- Saint John Neumann High School, Philadelphia merged with Saint Maria Goretti High School to become Saints John Neumann and Maria Goretti Catholic High School in 2004
- West Philadelphia Catholic High School for Boys, Philadelphia merged with West Philadelphia Catholic High School for Girls to become West Philadelphia Catholic High School in 1989

Closed

- Carson Long Military Academy, New Bloomfield (1836-2018)
- Kis-Lyn School for Boys, Butler Township (1912-1965)
- Northeast Catholic High School, Philadelphia (1926-2010)
- St. James High School for Boys, Chester (closed 1993)
- The Young Men's Leadership School at Thomas E. FitzSimons High School, Philadelphia (1926-2013)
- Valley Forge Military Academy, Wayne (7-12)

== Rhode Island ==
- Bishop Hendricken High School, Warwick (8-12)

== Tennessee ==
- The McCallie School, Chattanooga (6-12)
- Montgomery Bell Academy, Nashville (7-12)

Memphis

- Christian Brothers High School (9-12)
- Memphis University School (6-12)
- Presbyterian Day School (PK-6)
- St. Dominic School for Boys (PK-8)

== Texas ==
- Cathedral High School, El Paso (9-12)
- Gus Garcia Young Men's Leadership Academy, Austin (6-8)

Dallas-Fort Worth

- Barack Obama Male Leadership Academy, Dallas (6-12)
- Cistercian Preparatory School, Irving (5-12)
- Jesuit College Preparatory School of Dallas, Dallas (9-12)
- St. Mark's School of Texas, Dallas (1-12)
- Paul Laurence Dunbar Young Men's Leadership Academy, Fort Worth (6-12)
- Young Men's Leadership Academy at Fred F. Florence Middle School, Dallas (6-8)

Houston

- Mickey Leland College Preparatory Academy for Young Men (6-12)
- The Regis School of the Sacred Heart (PK-8)
- St. Thomas High School (9-12)
- Strake Jesuit College Preparatory (9-12)

San Antonio

- Central Catholic Marianist High School (9-12)
- Young Men's Leadership Academy at Wheatley (6-12)

Former

- Holy Cross of San Antonio, San Antonio became co-ed in 2002
- Pro-Vision Academy, Houston became co-ed in 2014
- St. Anthony Catholic High School, San Antonio became co-ed in 2003

== Virginia ==
- Benedictine College Preparatory, Goochland (9-12)
- Blue Ridge School, Saint George (9-12)
- Fork Union Military Academy, Fork Union (7-12)
- Hargrave Military Academy, Chatham (7-12)
- St. Christopher's School, Richmond (PK-12)
- Woodberry Forest School, Woodberry Forest (9-12)

Collegiate School is coeducational but puts boys and girls in separate classes during the Middle School years.

Former

- Bishop Ireton High School, Alexandria became co-ed in 1990

== Washington (state) ==
- Annie Wright Schools, Tacoma (co-ed PK-8, gender separated 9-12)
- O'Dea High School, Seattle (9-12)

== Wisconsin ==
- Marquette University High School, Milwaukee (9-12)
- St. Lawrence Seminary High School, Mt. Calvary (9-12)

== Guam ==
- Father Dueñas Memorial School, Chalan Pago (9-12)

== Correctional facilities ==
Note that some juvenile correctional facilities are named as "Boys' School" or "School for Boys", such as:

Closed

- Florida School for Boys (Arthur Dozier)
- Gatesville State School for Boys

== See also ==
- List of girls' schools in the United States
