= St. Charles College (Louisiana) =

Former Jesuit college in Grand Coteau, Louisiana

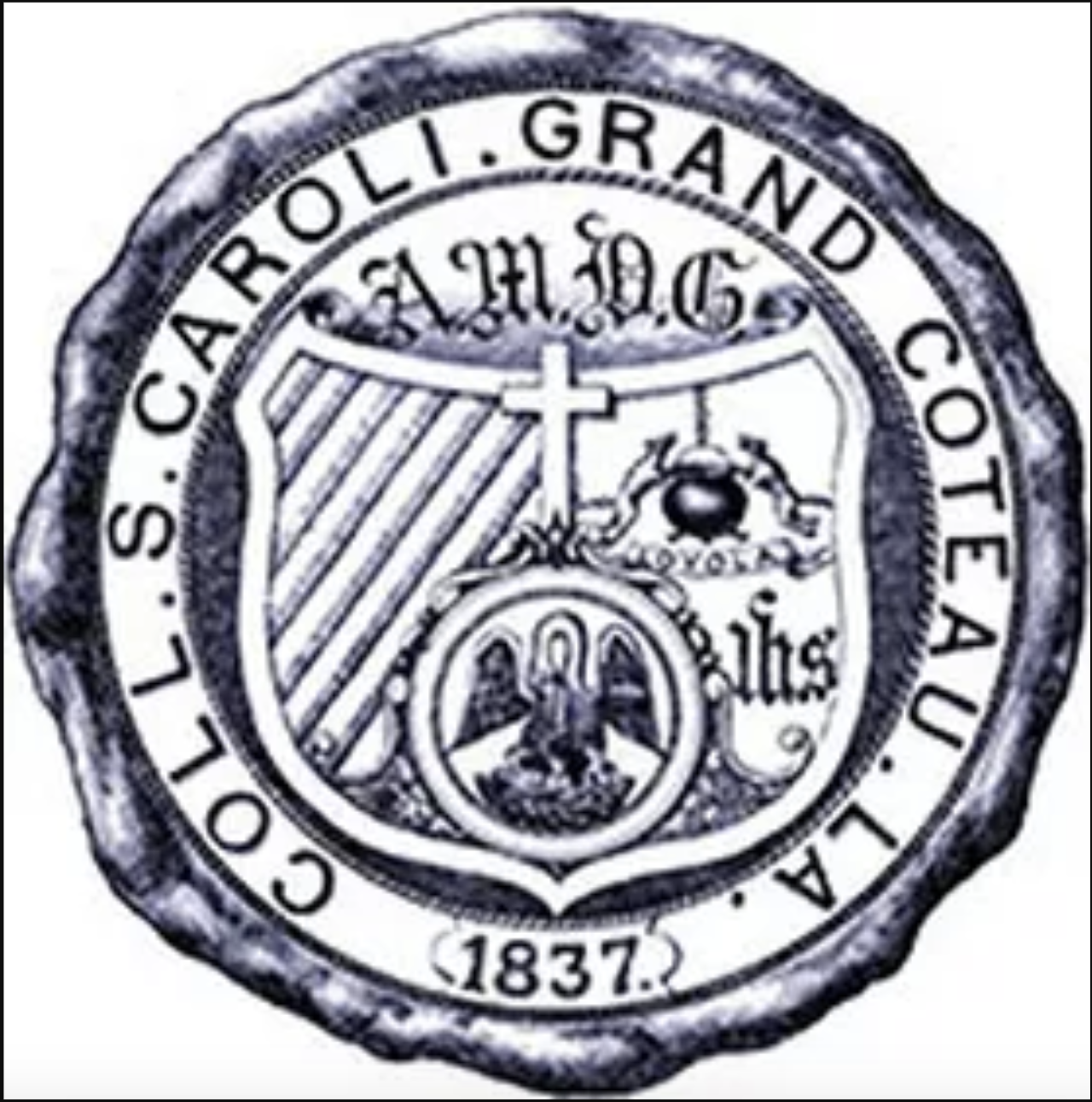
- Seal of St. Charles College
- Latin: Collegium Sancti Caroli
- Active: 1837–1922
- Founders: Nicolas Point, S.J.
- Religious affiliation: Roman Catholic (Jesuit)
- Location: Grand Coteau, Louisiana; 30°25′06″N 92°02′36″W

St. Charles College was a private college in Grand Coteau, Louisiana, United States. Founded in 1837 by Jesuits from France and Kentucky, the school was the first Jesuit college established in the American South. It initially educated lay students exclusively until 1890, when it began functioning as a Jesuit scholasticate as well. In 1922, the college closed, and the campus was used only to train Jesuit novices. Today, the campus continues to be used for the training of Jesuits, as well as a retreat center and a home for elderly Jesuits. The surviving structures date to 1909 and are contributing properties of the Grand Coteau Historic District.

== History ==
=== Founding ===
The earliest effort to introduce the Society of Jesus to the area came in 1826, when Louis William Valentine Dubourg, the Bishop of Louisiana and the Two Floridas, offered an estate in Opelousas, Louisiana to the Jesuit priest Van Quickenborne for use by a group of novices from the Jesuits' Maryland province. This plan did not materialize until one of Dubourg's successors, Antoine Blanc, the first Archbishop of New Orleans, recruited eight Jesuits from the province of Paris and the province of Lyon, as well one from Kentucky, Fr. Nicolas Point, who would be the superior. They were to establish a college in Iberville Parish, Louisiana, in 1837. When the superior met the French party upon their arrival in New Orleans, they unanimously agreed that it would be better to establish their school in Grand Coteau, as the Iberville site would be too small to accommodate the school, was located too close to the eroding banks of the Mississippi River, and restoration of the building would be prohibitively expensive. The large Catholic population in Grand Coteau, as well as the presence of the Sisters of the Sacred Heart, who operated the Academy of the Sacred Heart, drew them to Grand Coteau.

Bishop Blanc was in attendance at the ceremonial groundbreaking on the new St. Charles College or a boarding school in Grand Coteau on July 31, 1837. Upon its establishment, St. Charles became the first Jesuit college in the Southern United States. The Jesuits also assumed ownership of the nearby St. Charles Borromeo Church, which had been established in 1819. While many supported the establishment of a Jesuit school in Grand Coteau, some sent letters threatening harm if they did not leave, incited by a local newspaper that opposed the move. In response, the lay parishioners of St. Charles Church took up arms and stood watch twenty-four hours a day to guard the school and the priests. St. Charles College officially opened for its first day of classes on January 5, 1838.

By December of that year, the college had been transferred from the province of Paris to the province of Missouri, and the school was taken over by Jesuits from St. Louis. Fr. Point's administration of the college proved to be dissatisfactory, and he was relieved of office by the Jesuit superiors in 1840. The school was officially incorporated in 1852. St. Charles College closed in 1853, but the Jesuits continued to attend to St. Charles Church; the school reopened three years later. The college was under great strain during the Civil War, as many students withdrew to fight, and it became the last college operating in Louisiana west of the Mississippi River. The school was occupied and guaranteed protection by the Confederate Army during the war.

=== Transformation of mission ===
In 1890, St. Charles College began educating Jesuits in addition to lay students. The original college building was destroyed by fires in 1900 and 1907, and the present building was constructed in 1909. With decreasing enrollment in the early twentieth century due to students choosing to attend state schools, a Jesuit visitor recommended to closure of the school and sale of the campus; this was the proposal for all Jesuit schools in the South, with the exception of Loyola University New Orleans and Spring Hill College. Therefore, in 1922, St. Charles College was permanently closed. The campus was transformed exclusively into a scholasticate for the training of Jesuits.

== Modern-day use ==
Today, the campus continues to be used as a Jesuit novitiate. The facilities of St. Charles College also became the home of the Jesuit Spirituality Center in 1972, which hosts spiritual retreats. In 2013, it was put to additional use as a home for elderly Jesuits, known as the St. Alphonsus Rodrigue Pavilion. In 1979, the campus was listed as a contributing property of the Grand Coteau Historic District.

== Notable alumni ==
- René L. De Rouen, politician and United States Representative from Louisiana
- E. D. Estilette, politician and Speaker of the Louisiana House of Representatives
- Ricardo Lancaster-Jones y Verea, Mexican historian, diplomat, scholar, professor, art collector and sugarcane entrepreneur.
- Alfred Mouton, brigadier general in the Confederate Army
- Charles Homer Mouton, politician and Lieutenant Governor of Louisiana
- Alphonse E. Otis, Jesuit and president of Loyola University New Orleans
