= Cardale Jones =

American football football player (born 1992)

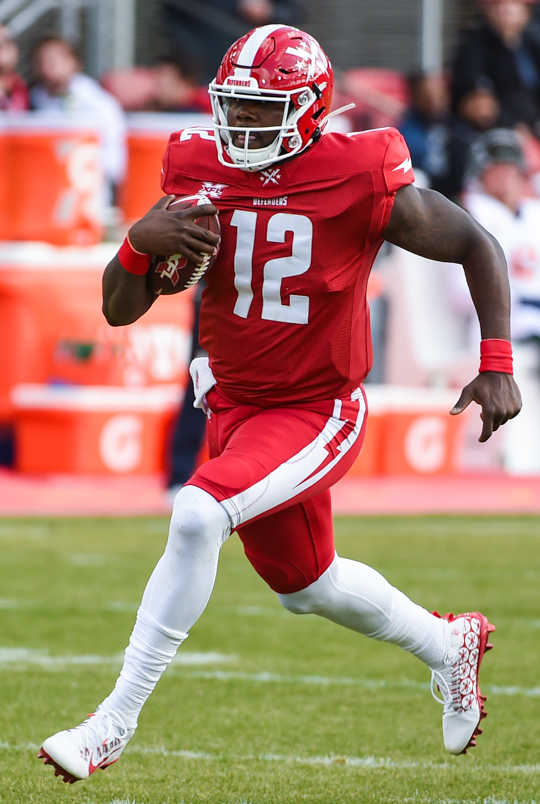
- Jones with the DC Defenders in 2020

No. 7
- Position: Quarterback

Personal information
- Born: September 29, 1992 (age 34); Cleveland, Ohio, U.S.
- Listed height: 6 ft 5 in (1.96 m)
- Listed weight: 260 lb (118 kg)

Career information
- High school: Glenville (Cleveland)
- College: Ohio State (2012–2015)
- NFL draft: 2016: 4th round, 139th overall pick

Career history
- Buffalo Bills (2016); Los Angeles Chargers (2017–2018); Seattle Seahawks (2019)*; DC Defenders (2020); Edmonton Elks (2022)*; Massachusetts Pirates (2023)*
- * Offseason or practice squad member only

Awards and highlights
- CFP national champion (2015)

Career NFL statistics
- Passing attempts: 11
- Passing completions: 6
- Completion percentage: 54.5%
- TD–INT: 0–1
- Passing yards: 96
- Passer rating: 46
- Stats at Pro Football Reference
- Stats at CFL.ca

Cardale Jones (/ˈkɑːrdeɪl/; born September 29, 1992) is an American former professional football player who was a quarterback in the National Football League (NFL). He played college football for the Ohio State Buckeyes, where he was a CFP national champion, and was selected by the Buffalo Bills in the fourth round of the 2016 NFL draft. He was also a member of the Los Angeles Chargers and Seattle Seahawks of the NFL, the DC Defenders of the XFL, the Edmonton Elks of the Canadian Football League (CFL), and the Massachusetts Pirates of the Indoor Football League (IFL).

== Early life ==
Jones attended Ginn Academy in Cleveland, Ohio, and played football for Ted Ginn Sr. at Glenville High School. Students at Ginn Academy are allowed to play at Glenville High. Jones led the Tarblooders to the OHSAA D-I Championship game in 2009. While at Glenville, Jones also lettered in basketball and track. Jones was ranked by Rivals.com as a three-star recruit. He committed to Ohio State University in October 2011.

== College career ==
=== 2012 season ===
Jones redshirted as a freshman and thus did not play, but nevertheless drew controversy when he posted the following on his Twitter account:

Avatar of Cardale Jones

Cardale Jones
(@Cordale10)
tweeted:

Why should we have to go to class if we came here to play FOOTBALL, we ain't come to play SCHOOL, classes are POINTLESS

October 5, 2012

The tweet received heavy criticism and Jones was suspended for one game. The tweet was featured as an example of bad social media behavior in the "Best Practices on Social Media" section of a textbook for "The Ole Miss Experience," a freshman year class at the University of Mississippi. In March 2014, head coach Urban Meyer described Jones as a "different guy" who was "making progress in the classroom." Later, Jones provided context for the tweet:

I remember I was in class, and I think I got, like, a B on a [sociology] exam. It was just something so stupid; of course I didn't feel that way about academics, and I don't. Nobody in this program feels that way, we actually take that stuff very serious around here. It was just a dumbass thing to do. I definitely didn't think that would happen. It was just a stupid thing to do at that time. It was something where I just got pissed because I studied my ass off.

— Cardale Jones, December 2014.

Ultimately, on May 7, 2017, Jones graduated from Ohio State with a bachelor's degree in African-American Studies.

=== 2013 season ===
Jones was sparingly used during his freshman season after red-shirting the 2012 season, playing only 39 snaps, attempting one pass and rushing for 128 yards and a touchdown on 17 carries.

=== 2014 season ===
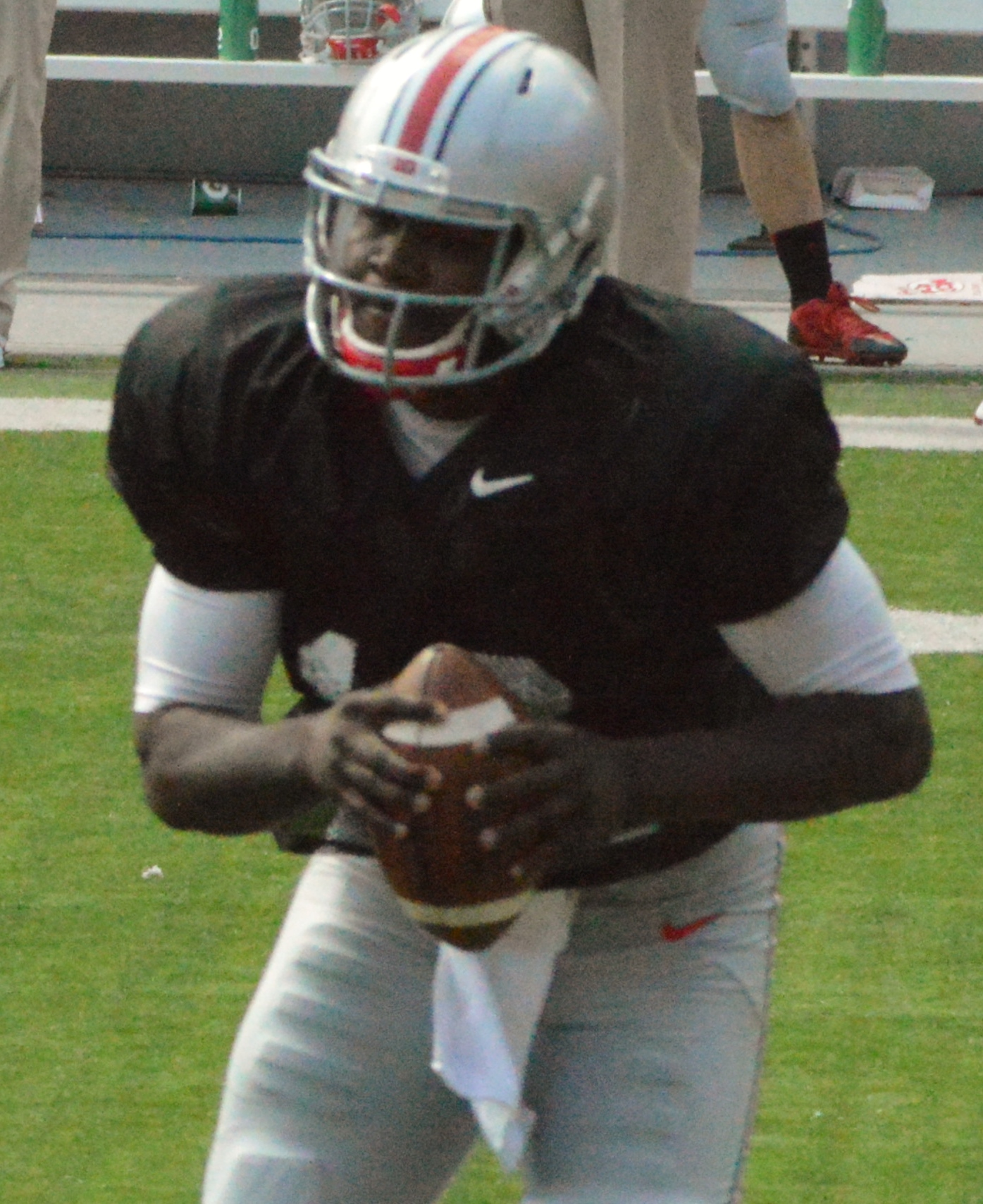
Jones in 2014, while at a spring game

Entering the 2014 season as a redshirt sophomore, Jones was third on the Buckeyes' depth chart, behind Braxton Miller and J. T. Barrett. Jones made his first start of his college career in the Big Ten Championship Game in place of Barrett, who had been injured the prior week versus Michigan. Jones led the #6 (AP) ranked Buckeyes squad to a 59–0 victory over the #11 ranked Wisconsin Badgers, on the eve of the NCAA football committee's inaugural playoff selection. Jones was named MVP of the game.

Jones made the second start of his college career, and the Ohio State Buckeyes defeated #1 ranked Alabama Crimson Tide 42–35 in the Allstate Sugar Bowl to advance to the College Football Playoff National Championship against the Oregon Ducks. In the College Football National Championship game, he excelled once again and led the Buckeyes to a 42–20 victory over the Ducks. Jones recorded 280 all-purpose yards, scoring two touchdowns. He completed 16 of 23 attempted passes for 242 yards, with one touchdown and one interception and ran for another 38 yards and a touchdown. The day after winning the National Championship, Jones discussed his future football career. In a news conference, Jones said that while he did not officially rule out declaring for the 2015 NFL draft, he believes that he is "not ready for that level yet," partly because he has only started in 3 college football games. Jones confirmed on January 15, 2015, that he would not declare for the 2015 draft, and would stay with Ohio State for at least another year, most probably until he graduated.

=== 2015 season ===
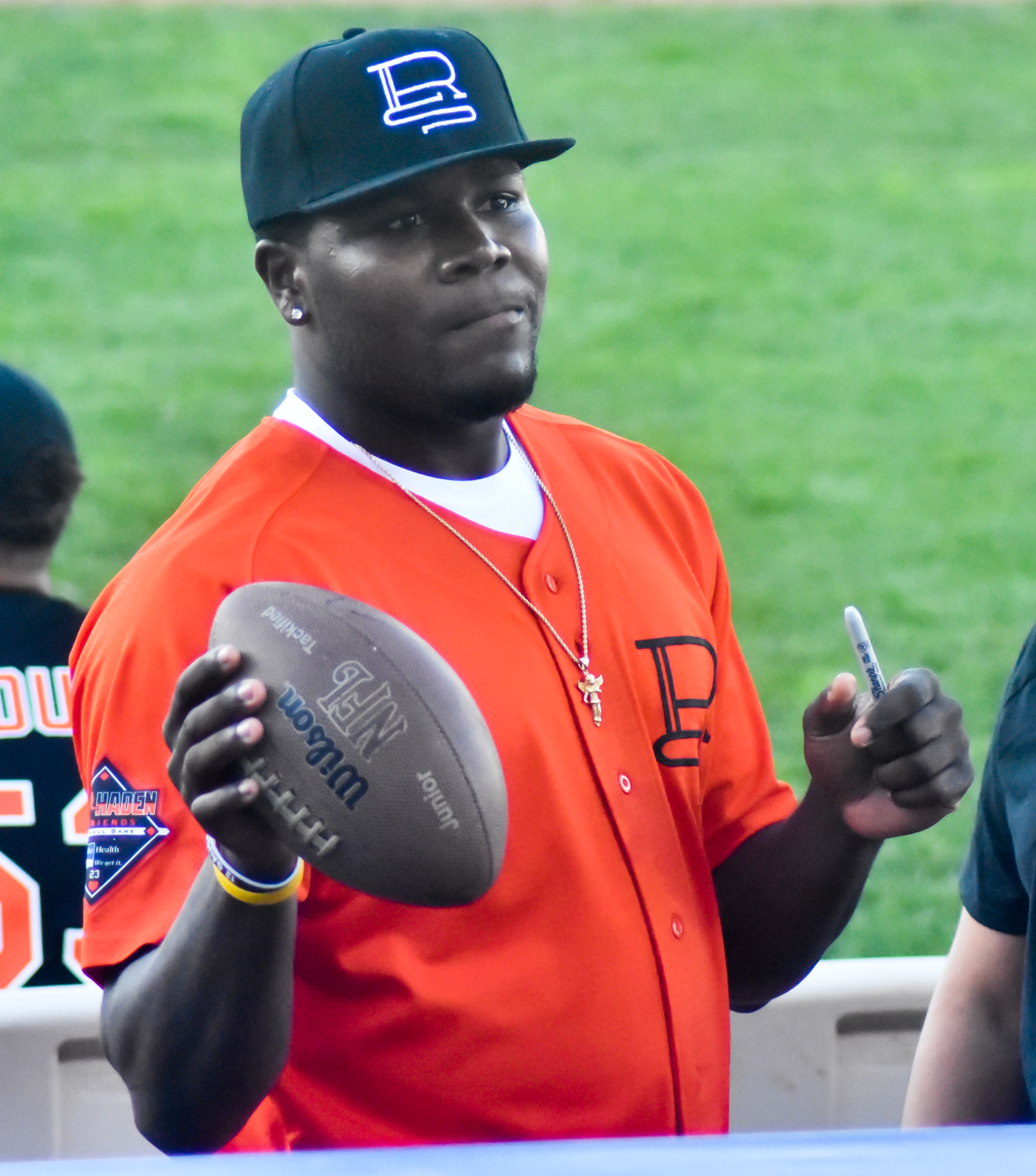
Jones in 2015

After a competition with Barrett that lasted the entire off-season, Jones was named the Buckeyes' starting quarterback immediately before game time in Ohio State's season opener at Virginia Tech. Both he and Barrett remained listed as co-starters on the depth chart headed into September 12 meeting with Hawaii. He set career highs in passing yards and completions against Maryland on September 10, 2015, with 21 completions, 291 passing yards, and two passing touchdowns. After starting the first seven games of the season, he was benched in favor of Barrett. After Ohio State's final home game, he announced his intention to enter the 2016 NFL draft.

== Professional career ==
=== Pre-draft ===
At the 2016 NFL Scouting Combine, Jones suffered a hamstring injury during his second 40-yard dash attempt, ending his workout prematurely.

Pre-draft measurables
Height	Weight	Arm length	Hand span	40-yard dash	10-yard split	20-yard split	Vertical jump
6 ft 5 in (1.96 m)	253 lb (115 kg)	33 3/4 in (0.86 m)	9 3/4 in (0.25 m)	4.81 s	1.67 s	2.78 s	36.0 in (0.91 m)
All values from NFL Combine

=== Buffalo Bills ===
Despite only starting 11 games in his college career, Jones was selected in the fourth round of the 2016 NFL draft, with the 139th overall selection, by the Buffalo Bills. On June 7, 2016, the Bills signed Jones to a rookie contract. In 2016, he was inactive for the first 15 games of the season as the third-string quarterback behind primary backup EJ Manuel and starter Tyrod Taylor. With Taylor being inactive for the final game of the season against the New York Jets, Jones was promoted to second string. Jones entered the game to begin the fourth quarter after Manuel was benched. Jones completed 6-of-11 passes for 96 yards and no touchdowns with one interception.

=== Los Angeles Chargers ===
On July 26, 2017, Jones was traded to the Los Angeles Chargers in exchange for a conditional draft pick.

On September 2, 2018, Jones was waived by the Chargers and was signed to the practice squad the next day. Jones signed a reserve/future contract with the Chargers on January 14, 2019.

On August 31, 2019, Jones was released by the Chargers.

=== Seattle Seahawks ===
On September 7, 2019, Jones was signed to the Seattle Seahawks practice squad. He was released on September 18.

=== DC Defenders ===
Jones was allocated to the DC Defenders of the XFL on October 15, 2019. He signed a contract with the team on November 4, 2019. In his first XFL start, Jones went 16-of-26 for 291 yards and two touchdowns and led the team in rushing, helping propel the DC Defenders to their first win. Jones led the Defenders to the XFL's first shutout, defeating the New York Guardians in Week 2 behind his 276 yards and two touchdowns in the 27–0 victory. He had his contract terminated when the league suspended operations on April 10, 2020.

=== Edmonton Elks ===
On May 6, 2022, it was announced that Jones had signed with the Edmonton Elks of the Canadian Football League (CFL). Jones was released by the Elks on May 20, 2022.

=== Massachusetts Pirates ===
On December 19, 2022, Jones signed with the Massachusetts Pirates of the Indoor Football League (IFL). On March 17, 2023, it was reported Jones had refused to report to practice for the Pirates. The Pirates announced they would be moving forward with re-signed quarterback Alejandro Bennifield. He was released on August 28.

== Career statistics ==
=== Professional ===
Year	League	Team	GP	GS	Passing								Rushing			
Year	League	Team	GP	GS	Cmp	Att	Pct	Yds	Y/A	TD	Int	Rtg	Att	Yds	Avg	TD
2016	NFL	BUF	1	0	6	11	54.5	96	8.7	0	1	46.0	1	−1	−1.0	0
2020	XFL	DC	5	5	61	113	54.0	674	6.0	4	7	57.9	16	61	3.8	0

=== College ===
Year	Team	Games			Passing								Rushing			
Year	Team	GP	GS	Record	Cmp	Att	Pct	Yds	Avg	TD	Int	Rtg	Att	Yds	Avg	TD
2012	Ohio State	Redshirt (redshirt)														
2013	Ohio State	3	0	0–0	1	2	50.0	3	1.5	0	0	62.6	17	128	7.5	1
2014	Ohio State	10	3	3–0	56	92	60.9	860	9.3	7	2	160.2	72	296	4.1	1
2015	Ohio State	10	8	8–0	110	176	62.5	1,460	8.3	8	5	141.5	64	193	3.0	2
Career		23	11	11–0	167	270	61.9	2,323	8.6	15	7	147.3	153	617	4.0	4

== Post-playing career ==
On October 10, 2025, Jones signed with the Columbus Aviators, returning to the XFL's successor, the United Football League, as a community ambassador. Though league co-owner Mike Repole joked about Jones potentially reviving his playing career after three years out of professional football, Jones stated that, though he "ha(d) no idea what" his role would entail, that he hoped it would involve a say in the team's backend decision-making.

On September 1, 2026, it was announced that Jones accepted a position as the varsity quarterbacks coach at Staples High School in Westport, CT.
