= Pro-Vision Academy =

Charter school in Houston, Texas

Pro-Vision Academy, is a state-authorized charter school in the Sunnyside area of Houston, Texas. A co-educational facility, it serves grades 3 through 12. It is one of the components of Pro-Vision, Inc., which also operates an after-school program and an aquaponics facility.

As of 2009 it was the city's only school catering to students classified as at risk that was headed by a former National Football League player.

== History ==
Roynell Young established the institution in 1990; initially it only admitted male students and was solely an after-school program. It was the first charter middle school only for male students in the city; Young argued that having female students would distract male students. He received inspiration after visiting many predominantly low-income African-American neighborhoods. He began a partnership with the Houston Independent School District (HISD), to establish a district-affiliated charter school for boys, then in the Third Ward. Young acquired the land for a permanent campus in 2008. Donations from private entities provided the funding. The occurrence of Hurricane Ike delayed the move, which occurred in November 2008.

In 2013 Pro-Vision ended its HISD affiliation and became a charter school with direct oversight from the State of Texas. In 2014 the school began admitting female students.

== Governance ==
As of 2017 Jeff Van Gundy is on the board of directors. Young had asked Van Gundy to join the board.

== Operations ==
As of 2009 the school expects its teachers to work, each, for ten months, with sixty hours per week, and also doing extra unpaid volunteer work on weekend and summer periods. Students who perform well in classes may have after-school activities while students with poor grades are required to do extra tutorial hours.

== Campus ==
Its campus has 21 acres (8.5 ha) of land, with a 30,000-square-foot (2,800 m^{2}) facility. It includes a 2 acres (0.81 ha) aquaponics area meant to generate fresh food for the food desert community around it. Plans call for an extra 30,000-square-foot (2,800 m^{2}) facility with classrooms and a gymnasium/multi-use facility. The campus also has an amphitheater, an American football field, a garden, a tree farm, and a trail. The National Football League (NFL) sponsored the football field.

The Third Ward facility used prior to the Sunnyside site was in a one-story building at Cullen Boulevard and Balkin Street. The building was made of brick. From 1995 to 2000 it had occupied around five different sites. In a period prior to 1998 it occupied a retail space that previously held a video rental store.

== Student body ==
In 2016 it had 360 students. As of 2017 it had 339 students. The school identified 77% as being "at-risk". According to the school, 95% of the total student body qualified for receiving school lunches without cost or at a lower cost than usual. Circa 2016 it anticipated having, at a later time, an enrollment of 435.

Paul Solotaroff stated in a 2009 article in Men's Journal that "nine out of 10 kids come in sorely behind in most subjects and drag along with them the kinds of chaos that KIPP and YES committees screen out."

Circa 2008 the school had 120 students at the middle school level. The statistics stated that 90% of them were in poverty. By 2009 the middle school enrollment had increased to 160.

== Academic performance ==
Circa 2008 the graduation rate was 81% as per a study commissioned by the school itself.

== See also ==
- List of state-chartered charter schools in Houston
- List of boys' schools in the United States
