= Sacred Heart Apostolic School =

School in Rolling Prairie, Indiana, United States

Location
- 5901 North 500 East; Rolling Prairie, (LaPorte County), Indiana 46371; United States; 41°40′15″N 86°36′57″W.

Information
- Type: Private, boarding school and high school seminary
- Motto: "Adveniat Regnum Tuum!" ("Thy Kingdom Come!")
- Religious affiliation: Christianity
- Denomination: Catholicism
- Patron saint: Sacred Heart of Jesus
- Established: 2005
- Founder: Rev, Eduardo de la Torre, LC
- Oversight: Board of Directors of Sacred Heart Apostolic School
- Administrator: Sean Heckaman
- Rector: Ronald Conklin, LC
- Principal: William Hobbs
- Staff: 10
- Teaching staff: 6
- Grades: 8–12
- Education system: Classical liberal arts
- Campus size: 51 acres (21 ha)
- Campus type: Rural
- Colors: Cardinal and White
- Slogan: Ready for Mission
- Athletics: Yes
- Accreditation: Cognia (education)
- Annual tuition: $17,500 without financial aid
- Affiliation: Legion of Christ

Sacred Heart Apostolic School (SHAS) is a Catholic minor seminary and all-male boarding school in Rolling Prairie, Indiana. It is located within the Diocese of Gary and operated by the Legionaries of Christ. It serves approximately 10–25 students enrolled in grades 8 through 12 and was established in 2005.

== History ==
The main building of the 51-acre (21 ha) campus was built in 1932–33 by the Congregation of Holy Cross. It was constructed as their novitiate and dedicated to St. Joseph. In 1968, they changed its use to an international boarding school called LeMans Academy. LeMans closed in 2003, and the property was divided before the Legion bought the main building in 2005.

== Academics ==
The academic program follows a classical liberal arts model which emphasizes classical (Latin and Greek) and modern foreign languages, British and American literature, mathematics and the natural sciences, history, theology, cultural studies, and the fine arts (vocal music, theater arts, and communication). The Latin and Greek courses, in particular, encourage all students to be able to read Virgil's Aeneid in the original Latin and translate the Gospel of John from the original Greek by their senior year. The mathematics program begins with pre-algebra and extends to Trigonometry and Calculus with an emphasis on theory rather than application. Students are required to take Spanish as a modern foreign language. Each student is also required to participate in the school's band and choir programs.

The school is accredited by Cognia.

== Spirituality ==
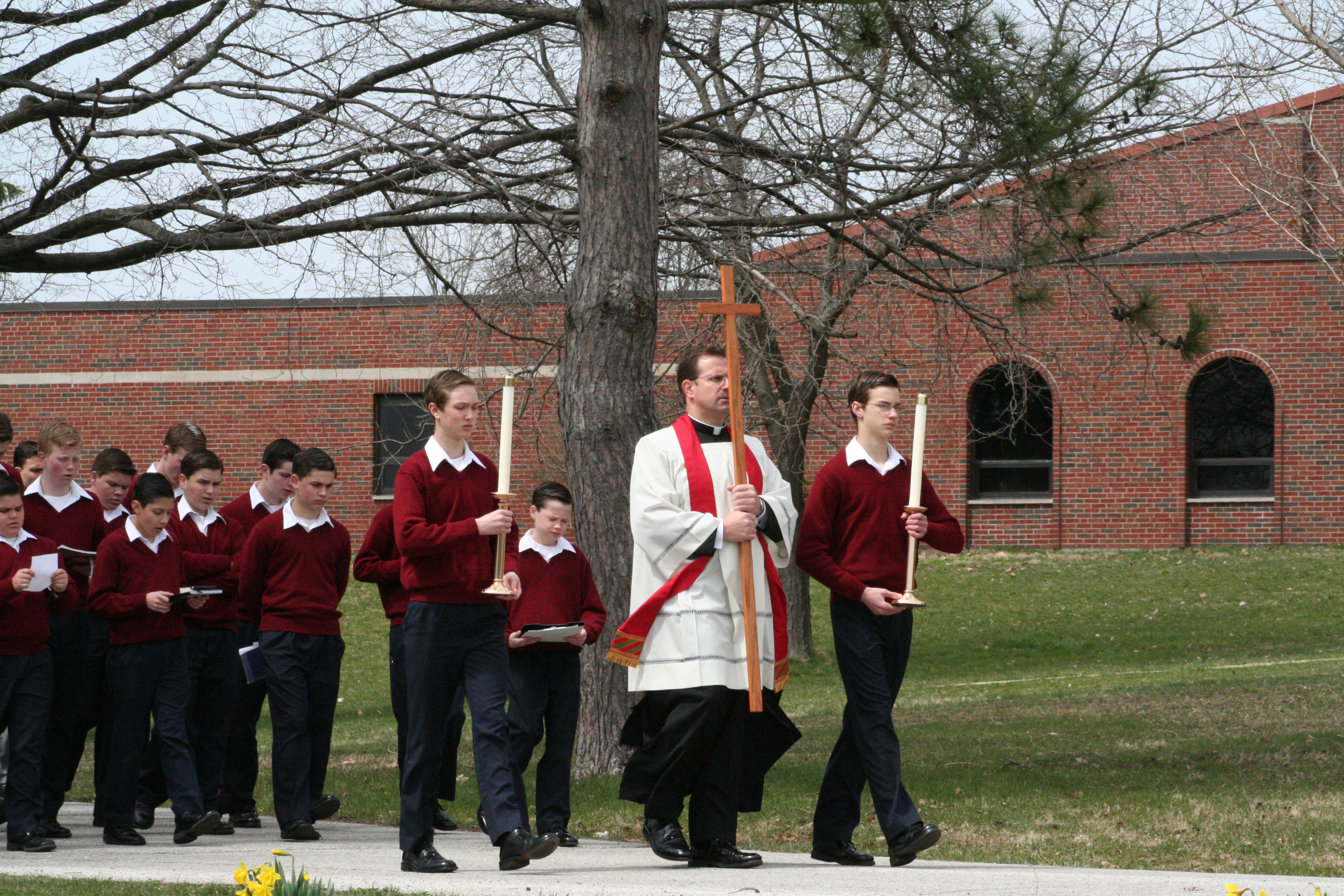
The students at Sacred Heart Apostolic School praying the Stations of the Cross on Good Friday, 2009

Religious practices such as the Holy Mass, the Rosary, and the Benediction of the Blessed Sacrament are provided regularly for the students. Students are introduced to Catholic spirituality, which takes different elements from various Christian spiritual authors.

The school also functions as a retreat center for boys and it hosts a month-long summer program for those who are interested in enrolling for the academic year. This summer program is promoted by Father Robert DeCesare, and Father Paul Silva.

The school has also hosted ordinations of Legionaries of Christ religious to the diaconate. The ordaining prelate is usually the reigning Bishop of Gary. While these ordinations have happened in the school chapel, its small size has prompted the administration to use larger nearby Catholic churches with the reception following on the school's campus.

== Leadership ==
The school is led by a rector, who is a priest of the Legionaries of Christ. The rector coordinates day-to-day operations of the school with the formation team and faculty. In previous years the academic dean was a priest of Legionaries of Christ; however, in recent years the school has made the chief academic officer a lay faculty member with the title of principal. In the early 2020s to combat declining enrollment, an oversight board was created to assist the school's leadership. Previously, the rector only reported to the Territorial Council of the Legionaries of Christ in North America. The first and current chairman of the Board of Sacred Heart Apostolic School is Rev. Daniel Brandenburg, LC. The Board contains an even split of religious persons and laymen.

=== List of rectors ===
- Rev. Eduardo de la Torre, LC (2005–2007), who is currently living extra domum from the Legionaries of Christ to assist at a Tridentine chapel in Gibson, Louisiana. He also lived extra domum from the community to assist at an apostolate of Institute of Christ the King Sovereign Priest a Society of apostolic life that exclusively uses pre-Vatican II rites.
- Daren Weisbrod (2007–2014), who, while rector of SHAS, was a priest of the Legionaries of Christ. In 2022, he petitioned Pope Francis to be dispensed of the obligations of the clerical state (laicized).
- Rev. Ronald Conklin, LC (2014–2015), first stint as rector
- Rev. Timothy Walsh, LC (2015–2019), who served as vice rector of SHAS under Weisbrod and rector of Immaculate Conception Apostolic School, the now-defunct SHAS counterpart in New Hampshire. Walsh oversaw the merger of the two campuses in 2015.
- Rev. Thomas Murphy, LC (2019–2023), who continued as Dean of Students after term as rector ended
- Rev. Ronald Conklin, LC (2023–present), second stint as rector
