= John Paxson =

American basketball player (born 1960)

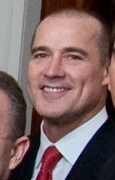
- Paxson at the White House in 2009

Chicago Bulls
- Title: Senior advisor
- League: NBA

Personal information
- Born: September 29, 1960 (age 66) Dayton, Ohio, U.S.
- Listed height: 6 ft 2 in (1.88 m)
- Listed weight: 185 lb (84 kg)

Career information
- High school: Archbishop Alter (Kettering, Ohio)
- College: Notre Dame (1979–1983)
- NBA draft: 1983: 1st round, 19th overall pick
- Drafted by: San Antonio Spurs
- Playing career: 1983–1994
- Position: Point guard
- Number: 4, 5
- Coaching career: 1995–1996

Career history

Playing
- 1983–1985: San Antonio Spurs
- 1985–1994: Chicago Bulls

Career highlights
- As player: 3× NBA champion (1991–1993); 2× Consensus second-team All-American (1982, 1983); McDonald's All-American (1979); Third-team Parade All-American (1979); As assistant coach: NBA champion (1996)

Career statistics
- Points: 5,560 (7.2 ppg)
- Rebounds: 906 (1.2 rpg)
- Assists: 2,758 (3.6 apg)
- Stats at NBA.com
- Stats at Basketball Reference

John MacBeth Paxson (born September 29, 1960) is an American basketball administrator and former player who was vice president of basketball operations for the Chicago Bulls of the National Basketball Association (NBA) from 2009 to 2020. He was their general manager from 2003 to 2009. Paxson played eleven NBA seasons for the San Antonio Spurs and Chicago Bulls, winning three championships as a member of the Bulls. He was an All-American college player at the University of Notre Dame.

== High school career ==
Paxson attended Archbishop Alter High School in Kettering, Ohio, following in the footsteps of his elder brother, Jim, who would go on to a star career at the University of Dayton, and, later, in the NBA, as a member of the Portland Trail Blazers. By his senior year, John was considered one of the top guards in the country and was named to the 1979 McDonald's All-American Team, joining such future college and NBA standouts as Isiah Thomas, James Worthy, and Byron Scott in the game.

== College career ==
Paxson played collegiate basketball at the University of Notre Dame in Notre Dame, Indiana. In 1980–81, his sophomore year, Paxson led the Fighting Irish in assists with a career-high 138 that season. He earned his first All-America recognition as a junior in 1981–82, averaging 16.4 points and dishing out 4.7 assists. The following year, Paxson led Notre Dame to a 19–10 record, averaging a career-high 17.7 points per game and tallying 112 assists en route to claiming his second All-America selection. He also helped guide the team to NCAA appearances in 1980 and 1981. For his career, he was a .526 shooter from the field, presaging his sharpshooting prowess in the pros. He finished his four-year stint at Notre Dame with 1,366 points (19th in Notre Dame history), 411 assists (seventh), 133 steals (eighth), 86 games started (13th), and field goal percentage (20th). His four-year average was 12.2 points per game.

=== Academic honors ===
Paxson graduated from Notre Dame in 1983 with a degree in Business Administration and a 3.71 GPA and was a two-time Academic All-American. Bob Arnzen, Pat Garrity, Tim Abromaitis and Paxson are the only four basketball players in Notre Dame's history to earn Academic All-America accolades more than once.

On June 6, 2005, Paxson was inducted into the College Sports Information Directors of America Academic All-America (CoSIDA) Hall of Fame, along with five other celebrities.

== NBA career ==
Paxson was selected by the San Antonio Spurs with the 19th overall pick of the 1983 NBA draft. In two seasons with the Spurs, he averaged 4.9 points per game and 2.9 assists. He then signed as a free agent with the Chicago Bulls, who teamed him in the backcourt with Michael Jordan. Paxson proved to be a valuable 3-point marksman and clutch shooter in the Bulls' first 3 championships.

Paxson is best known for his championship-winning shot during Game 6 of the 1993 NBA Finals. The Bulls were down by two in the last seconds of Game 6 of the finals series held at the America West Arena in Phoenix, Arizona, before Paxson shot a wide-open three point shot with 3.9 seconds remaining, giving the Bulls a 99–98 lead and their third consecutive NBA title, thanks to Horace Grant's last-second block on Kevin Johnson. In his NBA career, he started 369 games, and averaged 7.2 points and 3.6 assists per game.

== Coaching career ==
After Paxson's retirement, Bulls head coach Phil Jackson hired him as an assistant coach for the 1995–96 season. The Bulls won the title that year, fueled by Michael Jordan's return and the addition of another eventual Hall of Famer, Dennis Rodman. Paxson resigned shortly after the season to join Neil Funk on radio broadcasts, saying "I knew full well the time commitment coaching takes. But after that year I missed my wife and kids so much. I realized that if I didn't prioritize, I'd miss everything that they were doing." When Jordan joined the Washington Wizards, he asked Paxson to consider the head coaching job, but Paxson declined for the same reasons.

== Executive career ==
=== Chicago Bulls ===
In April 2003, Paxson left his broadcasting position to become General Manager for the Bulls after the resignation of longtime Bulls general manager Jerry Krause.

After a promising conclusion to the 2002–03 NBA season, Paxson pledged that the team would make the playoffs. He made headlines by signing former icon Scottie Pippen after years of bad relations between the franchise and one of the stars of their championship years. However, the Bulls opened the 2003–04 NBA season in sloppy and uninspired form, and Paxson opted to begin reshaping the character of the team by trading leading scorer Jalen Rose for Antonio Davis and firing friend and former teammate coach Bill Cartwright, replacing him with Scott Skiles. These moves had virtually no impact at all, and the Bulls finished Paxson's first season as general manager with a 23–59 record, second-worst in the NBA.

In his second season, however, Paxson was able to reshape the franchise with remarkable speed through the draft. Kirk Hinrich made the NBA All-Rookie Team in 2003–04, and the 2004–05 rookie class yielded four major contributors, Ben Gordon, Luol Deng, Chris Duhon and Andrés Nocioni. After a long drought dating back to Jordan's departure, the Bulls returned to the playoffs and posted the third-best record in the Eastern Conference, a 24-game improvement from the previous year. The Bulls were knocked out of the playoffs in the first round, by the Washington Wizards despite having home-court advantage, a better regular-season record and a 2–0 lead in the best of seven playoff series. The absence of starting center and leading scorer Eddy Curry and promising small forward Luol Deng in this series played a major role, although Tyson Chandler and Kirk Hinrich both performed well.

When center Eddy Curry showed possible symptoms of a heart problem shortly before the playoffs, Paxson took a cautious approach and would not clear Curry to play without extensive DNA testing. Ultimately, Curry was traded along with Antonio Davis to the New York Knicks for Michael Sweetney, Tim Thomas, and several draft picks. This trade would give them the Knicks' first-round pick in 2006, which they eventually used to acquire Tyrus Thomas, and the right to swap first-round picks with the Knicks in 2007. The Bulls floundered in the season that followed, but the team made a late-season run to finish at 41–41 and earn a second consecutive trip to the playoffs – as well as a second consecutive first-round exit. Eddy Curry has yet to miss another game due to a heart-related injury.

Paxson acknowledged "It's no secret we need to get size in our frontcourt and we need to get a bigger guard if we can, a defensive-oriented guard. And we really need some leadership on the floor. I think our guys are still young in their development there; it's a lot to ask an entire group to assume that leadership role. So, that's the wish list, if you could get everything you wanted. I'm optimistic about this offseason. We should be, we're in a really good position; we've got good, young players and the ability to add to that."

Following the Bulls' first-round loss to eventual champion, the Miami Heat, Paxson sought to improve the Bulls' frontcourt and defensive guard play by trading for rookie forward Tyrus Thomas, drafting guard Thabo Sefolosha, and signing four-time Defensive Player of the Year Ben Wallace.

The Bulls experienced an up-and-down regular season in 2006–07, winning 49 games but suffering a demoralizing loss to the New Jersey Nets in the last game of the season, dropping as a result from the 2-seed in the East to the 5-seed. Deng rewarded his general manager's loyalty by playing dominating basketball in the Bulls' first-round playoff sweep of the defending champion Heat in April 2007. But Paxson observed the Bulls' lack of a low-post threat when they were beaten by the Pistons in six games.

After high expectations for the 2007–08 season, the Bulls started 9–16 and were last in the Central division. He fired Scott Skiles on December 24, 2007. Saying "This was a difficult decision to make, but one that was necessary at this time. Scott helped us in many ways during his time with the Bulls; most importantly, he helped this franchise get back to respectability. I am appreciative of his hard work and the imprint that he left on our team." Over the span of five seasons with the Bulls, Skiles compiled a record of 165–172 (.490), and guided the team to the playoffs three consecutive years before getting fired. Paxson promoted assistant coach Jim Boylan to interim head coach and the Bulls finished the year with a 33–49 record, missing the playoffs. Despite having only 1.7% probability, the Bulls won the NBA draft lottery and selected Chicago native Derrick Rose with the first pick in the 2008 NBA draft. In June 2008, Paxson named former NBA player and scout Vinny Del Negro head coach, but their relationship eventually went sour. Multiple reports surfaced that on March 30, 2010, Paxson and Del Negro got into a physical altercation over the minutes of Bulls center Joakim Noah, who was recovering from a foot injury. Paxson allegedly grabbed Del Negro by the tie and shoved him. Del Negro was fired a little over a month later.

On May 21, 2009, Gar Forman replaced Paxson as general manager, when he was promoted to vice president of basketball operations.

On April 13, 2020, Paxson was reassigned as senior advisor of basketball operations, when the Bulls named Artūras Karnišovas executive vice president of basketball operations.

== Personal life ==
Paxson attended Le Mans Academy Military Boarding School in Indiana, where he played basketball, and later Archbishop Alter High School, where he led his team to a state championship in 1978. His father, James, played in the NBA for two years in the mid-1950s, for the Minneapolis Lakers and Cincinnati Royals, and his brother Jim played 11 years in the NBA with the Portland Trail Blazers and the Boston Celtics.

== NBA career statistics ==
Legend
GP	Games played	GS	Games started	MPG	Minutes per game
FG%	Field goal percentage	3P%	3-point field goal percentage	FT%	Free throw percentage
RPG	Rebounds per game	APG	Assists per game	SPG	Steals per game
BPG	Blocks per game	PPG	Points per game	**Bold**	Career high
†	Won an NBA championship

=== Regular season ===
Year	Team	GP	GS	MPG	FG%	3P%	FT%	RPG	APG	SPG	BPG	PPG
1983–84	San Antonio	49	0	9.3	.445	.182	.615	0.7	3.0	0.2	0.0	2.9
1984–85	San Antonio	78	1	16.1	.509	.294	.840	0.9	2.8	0.6	0.0	6.2
1985–86	Chicago	75	3	20.9	.466	.300	.804	1.3	3.7	0.7	0.0	5.3
1986–87	Chicago	**82**	64	**32.8**	.487	.371	.809	**1.7**	**5.7**	0.8	**0.1**	**11.3**
1987–88	Chicago	81	30	23.3	.493	.347	.733	1.3	3.7	0.6	0.0	7.9
1988–89	Chicago	78	20	22.3	.480	.331	**.861**	1.2	3.9	0.7	**0.1**	7.3
1989–90	Chicago	**82**	**82**	28.8	.516	.359	.824	1.5	4.1	**1.0**	**0.1**	10.0
1990–91†	Chicago	**82**	**82**	24.0	**.548**	.438	.829	1.1	3.6	0.8	0.0	8.7
1991–92†	Chicago	79	79	24.6	.528	.273	.784	1.2	3.1	0.6	**0.1**	7.0
1992–93†	Chicago	59	8	17.5	.451	**.463**	.850	0.8	2.3	0.6	0.0	4.2
1993–94	Chicago	27	0	12.7	.441	.409	.500	0.7	1.2	0.3	**0.1**	2.6
Career		772	369	22.4	.499	.355	.804	1.2	3.6	0.7	0.1	7.2

=== Playoffs ===
Year	Team	GP	GS	MPG	FG%	3P%	FT%	RPG	APG	SPG	BPG	PPG
1985	San Antonio	5	0	22.8	.500	.222	.778	1.0	**4.2**	**1.0**	0.0	**10.2**
1986	Chicago	3	0	26.7	.467	–	.765	0.0	1.7	1.0	0.0	9.0
1987	Chicago	3	3	**29.0**	.500	.429	**1.000**	1.0	3.7	0.7	0.0	8.7
1988	Chicago	10	0	16.5	.377	.167	**1.000**	0.4	3.0	0.1	**0.1**	4.6
1989	Chicago	16	0	18.9	.474	.263	.875	0.6	2.1	0.8	0.0	5.8
1990	Chicago	15	15	26.3	.425	.444	**1.000**	**1.5**	3.6	0.6	0.0	6.1
1991†	Chicago	17	17	28.6	.530	.143	**1.000**	1.4	3.1	0.6	0.0	8.2
1992†	Chicago	**22**	**22**	27.2	.525	.444	.842	1.0	2.8	0.6	0.0	7.9
1993†	Chicago	19	0	17.4	**.583**	**.625**	.727	1.0	1.7	0.3	**0.1**	4.9
1994	Chicago	9	0	6.4	.429	.000	–	0.1	0.6	0.2	0.0	0.7
Career		119	57	22.0	.494	.369	.867	0.9	2.6	0.5	0.0	6.3
