= Le Mans Academy =

American Catholic boarding school

Coordinates: 41°41′32.9″N 86°36′3.3″W

LeMans Academy (formerly Sacred Heart Military Academy) was a private Catholic boarding middle school (grades 5–9) for boys located 90 minutes east of Chicago, Illinois, near La Porte, Indiana, on 700 acres (2.8 km^{2}) of land. It was sponsored by the Brothers of Holy Cross from the University of Notre Dame. It was founded in 1955 in Watertown, Wisconsin.

== History ==
Sacred Heart Military Academy (called SHMA by the students) operated in Watertown, Wisconsin, until the summer of 1968. After graduating its last class, the school was moved to Rolling Prairie, Indiana. The name was changed, in part, because the brothers in Watertown kept receiving applications from the parents of girls.

The last class consisted mostly of boys from the Milwaukee and Chicago areas with many from Mexico. Student activities included military drills, a rifle range, a large gym, soccer, track, baseball, and other sports. The school also had a slot car track and recreation room. The students wore military uniforms every day and a special dress uniform on Sunday. Boys held different ranks and received demerits for bad behavior. Demerits had to be worked off with calisthenics and stress positions like bending at the waist with hands clasped behind the head. Offenses like fighting earned the use of "the paddle". Students were required to learn Drill. Students were not allowed to carry money or to leave the campus. Students were allowed phone calls on a certain night of the week. Students were not allowed to go home for a few days on break, (Weekend Break) should they have too many Demerits. Students were required to stay in their rooms after 9:00 P.M. Students Study halls were held every evening but Sunday for two hours. Daily life was very regimented, classes were held Monday through Friday, as well as Saturday morning, and students had only about two hours to themselves every day. Brother John Driscoll was headmaster for many years and was later replaced by Brother Carroll Posey. On May 26, 1968, SHMA graduated its last class of 35 eighth grade students. About 700 people attended. In the summer of 1968, the school was moved to Indiana. SHMA had only grades 5–8. The Watertown campus is now Maranatha Baptist Bible College.

== LeMans Academy ==
With its highest enrollment in years—more than 115 boarding students from across the U.S., Mexico, South Korea, and other nations—Le Mans Academy closed in the spring of 2003 because the Catholic religious order which founded and sponsored the school—the Brothers of Holy Cross, Midwest Province—needed to liquidate an available asset (the academy's campus was sold and its endowment claimed) to help meet the rising cost of health care for its aging population of religious Brothers. The first lay Headmaster in the academy's history—Mr. Steven Cash—was also the last Headmaster.

The campus was purchased by the Legionaries of Christ to open an minor seminary, named Sacred Heart Apostolic School.

== Notable alumni ==
- Jesse Jackson, Jr.
- John Paxson
