= Girls' Academy of Newark =

Coordinates: 40.709338°N 74.220215°W

Girls' Academy of Newark is a public all-girls' school in Newark, in Essex County, New Jersey, United States. The school, under Newark Public Schools, is located in the Louise A. Spencer School complex in Central Ward. The school, scheduled to become a grade 6-12 school, opened in 2013 with 75 sixth-grade students. It was the first public all-girls' school in New Jersey since Battin High School in Elizabeth, which merged into a boys' school in 1977.

== See also ==
- Eagle Academy for Young Men of Newark - An all boys' school in Newark
