= Proctor Wildlife Sanctuary =

Protected area in New Hampshire, United States

Coordinates: 43°43′10″N 71°29′32″W

Proctor Wildlife Sanctuary is a protected area maintained by the New Hampshire Audubon Society. It is located in Center Harbor, New Hampshire. The sanctuary is 47 acres (190,000 m^{2}) of second generation woodlands that has about two miles (3 km) of hiking trails.

The land was donated to the New Hampshire Audubon Society in memory of Jean K. Proctor in 1975.
