= Ted Ginn Sr. =

American football coach (born 1955)

- Born: Theodore Ginn; November 10, 1955 (age 70); Louisiana, U.S.
- Occupations: High school coach School administrator
- Years active: 1978–present
- Children: Ted Ginn Jr.

Theodore Ginn Sr. (born November 10, 1955) is the coach of the Glenville High School football and track teams (the Tarblooders) in Cleveland, Ohio. He is the father of former NFL wide receiver Ted Ginn Jr. In addition, he has two other children, Tiffany Ginn and Jason Lucas from Akron, Ohio. In 2001, Theodore Ginn, who began working in the Cleveland Public School District as security guard at Glenville High, coached the U.S. Army All-American Bowl and also in 2006 when he was the head coach. He also started the Ted Ginn Sr. Foundation Annual Combat Bus Tour taking inner city high school football players from around the country to the major college combines. In 2007, he helped establish Ginn Academy, an all-boys high school for at-risk Cleveland students.

As track and field coach, Ginn has led Glenville to six state championships, and in November 2006, a portion of Gray Avenue on the east side of Cleveland was renamed "Ted Ginn Sr. Avenue" in his honor. In 2022, he led Glenville to the OHSAA Division IV State Football Championship, marking not only Glenville's first football title, but also the first for a school from the Cleveland Metropolitan School District. Ginn led Glenville to a second title in 2023 and a third title in 2025.

== Awards and honors ==
- Nine-time OHSAA champion
  - Six as boys' track and field coach (2003–2007, 2014)
  - Three as head football coach (2022, 2023, 2025)
- Gray Avenue in Cleveland renamed "Ted Ginn Sr. Avenue"
- 2023 Lifetime Achievement Award – Greater Cleveland Sports Awards
- National High School Hall of Fame – Class of 2023
- National High School Football Hall of Fame – Inaugural Class of 2023
