= Center Harbor, New Hampshire =

- Town
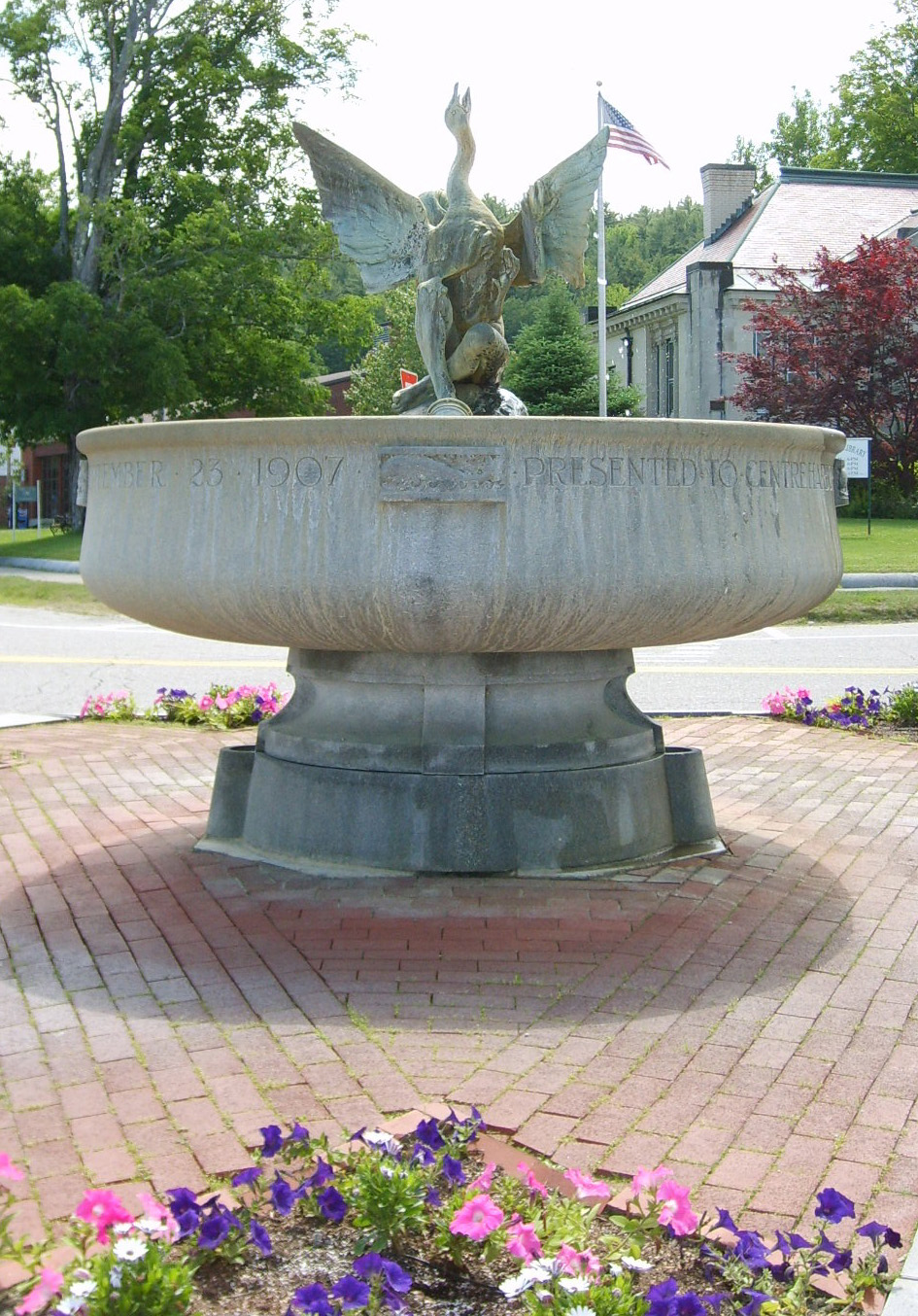
- Kona Fountain in the center of town, 2007

- Seal
- Motto: Winter Home of the M/S Mt. Washington
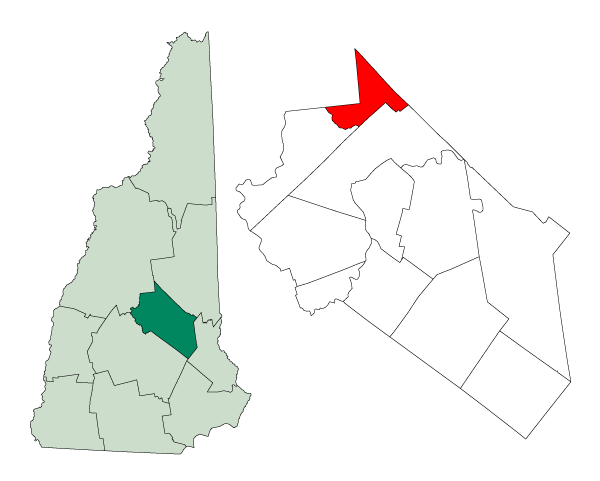
- Location in Belknap County, New Hampshire
- Coordinates: 43°42′11″N 71°30′42″W
- Country: United States
- State: New Hampshire
- County: Belknap
- Incorporated: 1797

Area
  - Total: 16.3 sq mi (42.1 km^{2})
  - Land: 13.3 sq mi (34.4 km^{2})
  - Water: 3.0 sq mi (7.7 km^{2}) 18.3%
- Elevation: 702 ft (214 m)

Population (2020)
  - Total: 1,040
  - Density: 78/sq mi (30.3/km^{2})
- Time zone: UTC-5 (Eastern)
  - Summer (DST): UTC-4 (Eastern)
- ZIP code: 03226
- Area code: 603
- FIPS code: 33-10660
- GNIS feature ID: 873561
- Website: www.centerharbornh.org

Center Harbor is a town in Belknap County, New Hampshire, United States. As of the 2020 census, the town had a population of 1,040, and an estimated 1,049 in 2025. It is situated between Lake Winnipesaukee and Squam Lake.

== History ==
Center Harbor separated from the town of New Hampton and was first incorporated in 1797. The town name is derived from two sources: its location, centered between Meredith and Moultonborough harbors, as well as from the Senter family, who were owners of a large amount of property in the area. The town was a landing place for lake steamers and stagecoaches, making it a popular summer resort. Center Harbor was a favorite spot of John Greenleaf Whittier, and the home of Dudley Leavitt, author of the first Farmers' Almanac in 1797. Center Harbor is the winter home of the paddle steamer MS Mount Washington, the largest boat on Lake Winnipesaukee.

Center Harbor witnessed the first intercollegiate sporting event in the United States, as Harvard defeated Yale by two lengths in the first Harvard–Yale Regatta on August 3, 1852, on Lake Winnipesaukee.

== Geography ==
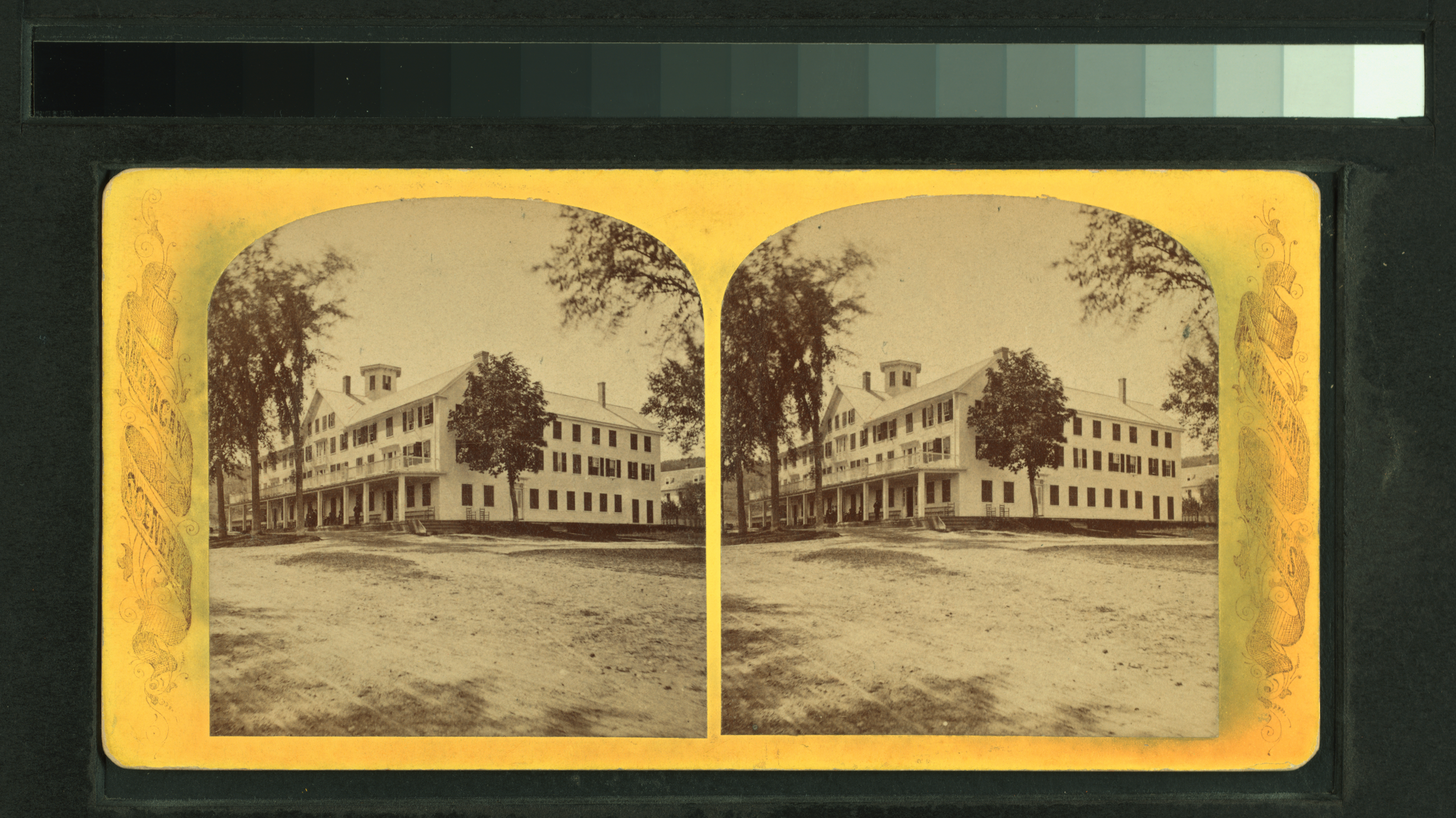
Senter House

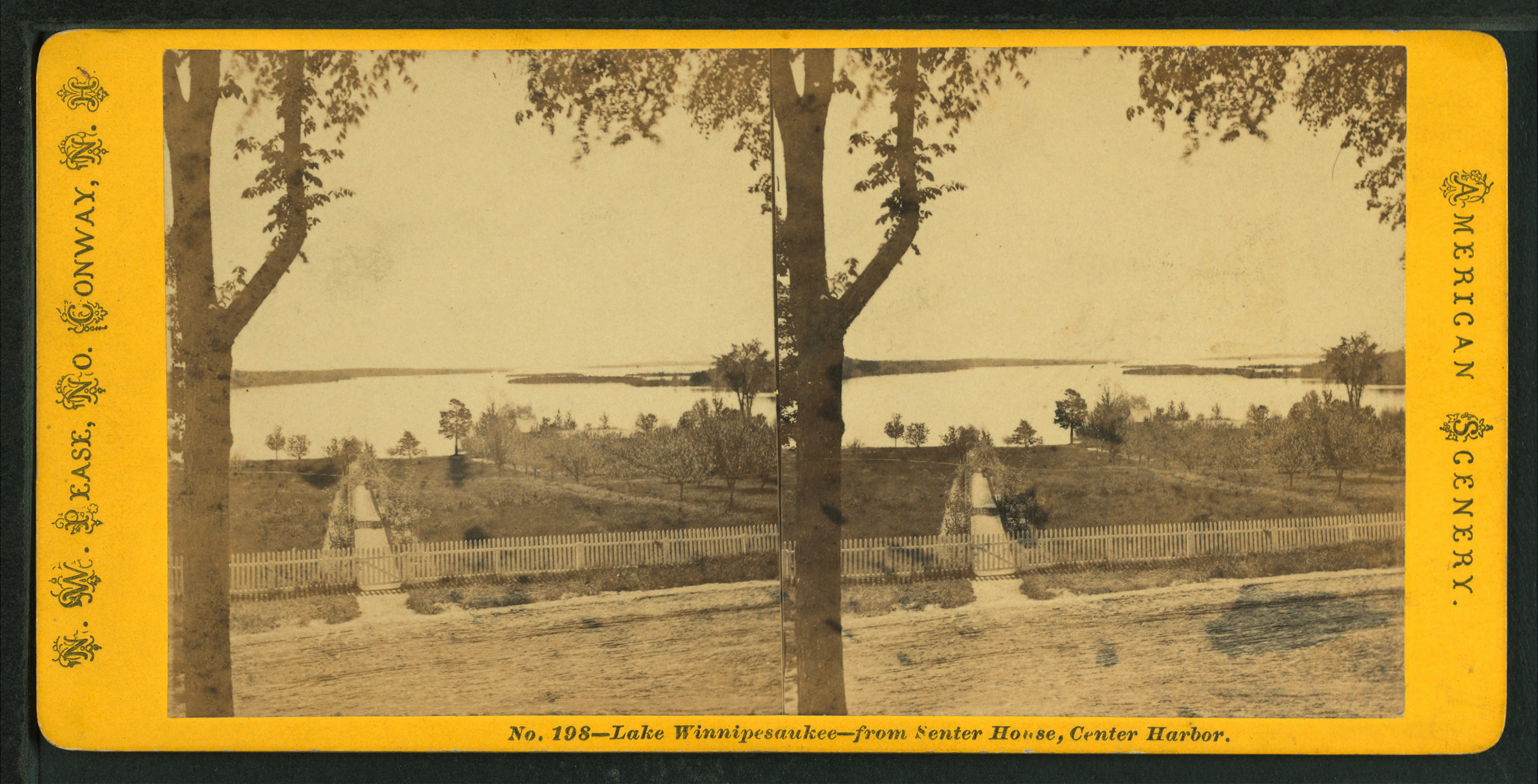
View of the lake from Senter House by Nathan W. Pease

According to the United States Census Bureau, the town has a total area of 16.3 square miles (42.1 km^{2}), of which 13.3 sq mi (34.4 km^{2}) are land and 3.0 sq mi (7.7 km^{2}) are water, comprising 18.33% of the town. It has several miles of shoreline on Squam Lake and another mile on Lake Winnipesaukee, where its main "harbor" lies. The town center sits eccentrically near Center Harbor's northeastern border, where it rises gently from the shore at the junction of New Hampshire Routes 25 and 25B. The commercial district including the town center extends for several hundred yards along NH 25 into the neighboring town of Moultonborough. The highest point in town, Sunset Hill, elevation 1,121 feet (342 m) above sea level, overlooks the town center from the west. Center Harbor lies fully within the Merrimack River watershed.

NH 25 passes through the eastern edge of town, including the town center, connecting Meredith to the south with Moultonborough to the northeast. U.S. Route 3 and NH 25 pass north–south through the western part of town, connecting Meredith to the south with Holderness to the northwest. NH 25B leads from the town center west to US 3 and NH 25, forming a shortcut for through travelers on NH 25.

The Proctor Wildlife Sanctuary, owned by the Audubon Society of New Hampshire, occupies 47 acres (19 ha) of woodlands northwest of the town center. Adjacent to this property is Center Harbor Woods, a 225 acres (91 ha) conservation area owned by the Lakes Region Conservation Trust and protected by a conservation easement held by the Squam Lakes Conservation Society and the town of Center Harbor. The two properties abut a third conservation property in neighboring Moultonborough, resulting in a block of protected woodland comprising nearly 400 acres (160 ha).

=== Adjacent municipalities ===
- Moultonborough (east)
- Meredith (south)
- New Hampton (southwest)
- Holderness (northwest)

== Demographics ==
Historical population
Census	Pop.	Note	%±
1800	263		—
1810	349		32.7%
1820	486		39.3%
1830	577		18.7%
1840	584		1.2%
1850	543		−7.0%
1860	484		−10.9%
1870	446		−7.9%
1880	521		16.8%
1890	479		−8.1%
1900	422		−11.9%
1910	420		−0.5%
1920	422		0.5%
1930	382		−9.5%
1940	355		−7.1%
1950	451		27.0%
1960	511		13.3%
1970	540		5.7%
1980	808		49.6%
1990	996		23.3%
2000	996		0.0%
2010	1,096		10.0%
2020	1,040		−5.1%
2024 (est.)	1,047	▲	0.7%
U.S. Decennial Census

As of the census of 2000, there were 996 people, 414 households, and 293 families residing in the town. The population density was 74.4 inhabitants per square mile (28.7/km^{2}). There were 653 housing units at an average density of 48.8 per square mile (18.8/km^{2}). The racial makeup of the town was 98.80% White, 1.00% Hispanic or Latino and 0.80% Asian.

There were 414 households, out of which 28.5% had children under the age of 18 living with them, 57.7% were married couples living together, 9.4% had a female householder with no husband present, and 29.2% were non-families. 22.0% of all households were made up of individuals, and 9.4% had someone living alone who was 65 years of age or older. The average household size was 2.38 and the average family size was 2.75. In the town, the population was spread out, with 21.5% under the age of 18, 5.2% from 18 to 24, 24.0% from 25 to 44, 31.9% from 45 to 64, and 17.4% who were 65 years of age or older. The median age was 45 years. For every 100 females, there were 100.4 males. For every 100 females age 18 and over, there were 101.0 males.

The median income for a household in the town was $51,806, and the median income for a family was $55,938. Males had a median income of $35,526 versus $24,231 for females. The per capita income for the town was $25,627. 6.7% of the population and 4.4% of families were below the poverty line. Out of the total population, 13.4% of those under the age of 18 and 5.6% of those 65 and older were living below the poverty line.

== Government ==
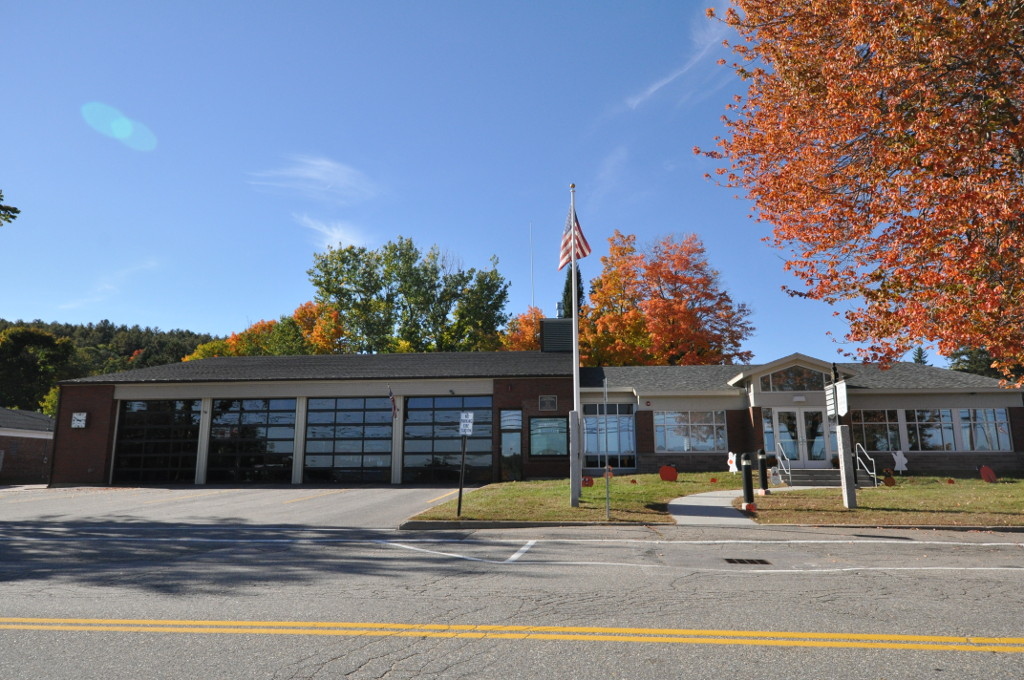
Town hall

In the New Hampshire Senate, Center Harbor is in the 2nd District, represented by Republican Bob Giuda. On the Executive Council of New Hampshire, Center Harbor is in the 1st District, represented by Republican Joseph Kenney. In the United States House of Representatives, Center Harbor is in New Hampshire's 2nd congressional district, represented by Democrat Ann McLane Kuster.

== Economy ==
Aside from small dairy and truck farms, the community's main industry is tourism. Restaurants and motels dot the shoreline, with a beach and playground at the town's center which is shared by residents of Moultonborough.

== Education ==
Center Harbor's one-room schoolhouse closed in the 1970s, and students now attend Inter-Lakes Elementary and Inter-Lakes Junior-Senior High in Meredith, joining students from that town and from Sandwich. During the period 1963–1973, a college existed in Center Harbor. Named Belknap College, it occupied several locations in town, using old hotels for dorms, though the academic campus was located several miles away. Anchored by a mansion recently used for the New Hampshire Music Festival, and several other buildings, the campus was a center of activity.

The town was the home of Immaculate Conception Apostolic School, an all-male Roman Catholic boarding school, educating between 80 and 100 students from grades 7 to 12. It is sponsored by the Legionaries of Christ, a religious congregation of the Roman Catholic Church. It was listed for sale in 2021.

== Notable people ==
- Samuel Chamberlain (1829–1908), brevet general, former outlaw
- Phoebe Foster (1896–1975), actress
- Harriet Lane Huntress (1860–1922), Deputy Superintendent Public Instruction in New Hampshire
- Dudley Leavitt (1772–1851), publisher
- Brad Leighton (born 1962), driver with NASCAR
- Maud Worcester Makemson (1891–1977), astronomer
- Penny Pitou (born 1938), Olympic downhill skier

== Culture ==
Center Harbor hosts a Fourth of July celebration featuring a road race (including a children's race around the library), parade, band concert, and fireworks over the lake. The Center Harbor Town Band, founded in 1878, offers free concerts on Fridays in the summer. In the winter, the town is a stop for snowmobile enthusiasts.

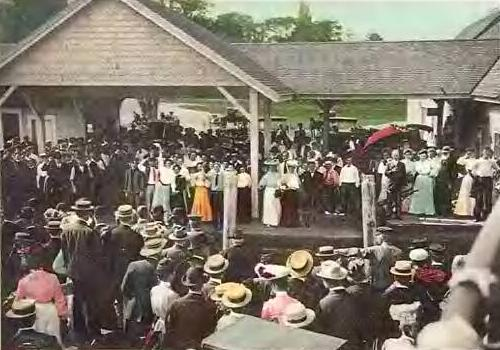
Steamer Landing, 1906

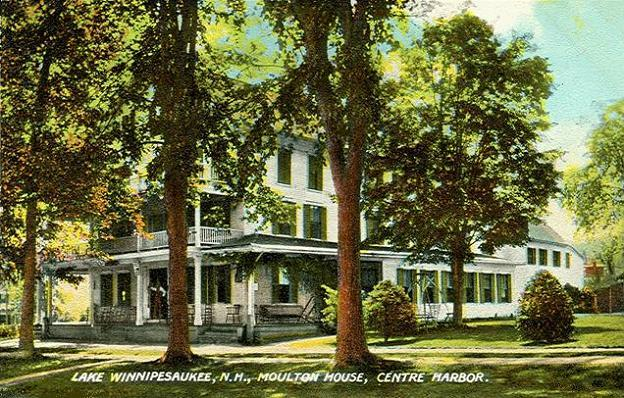
The Moulton House, c. 1910

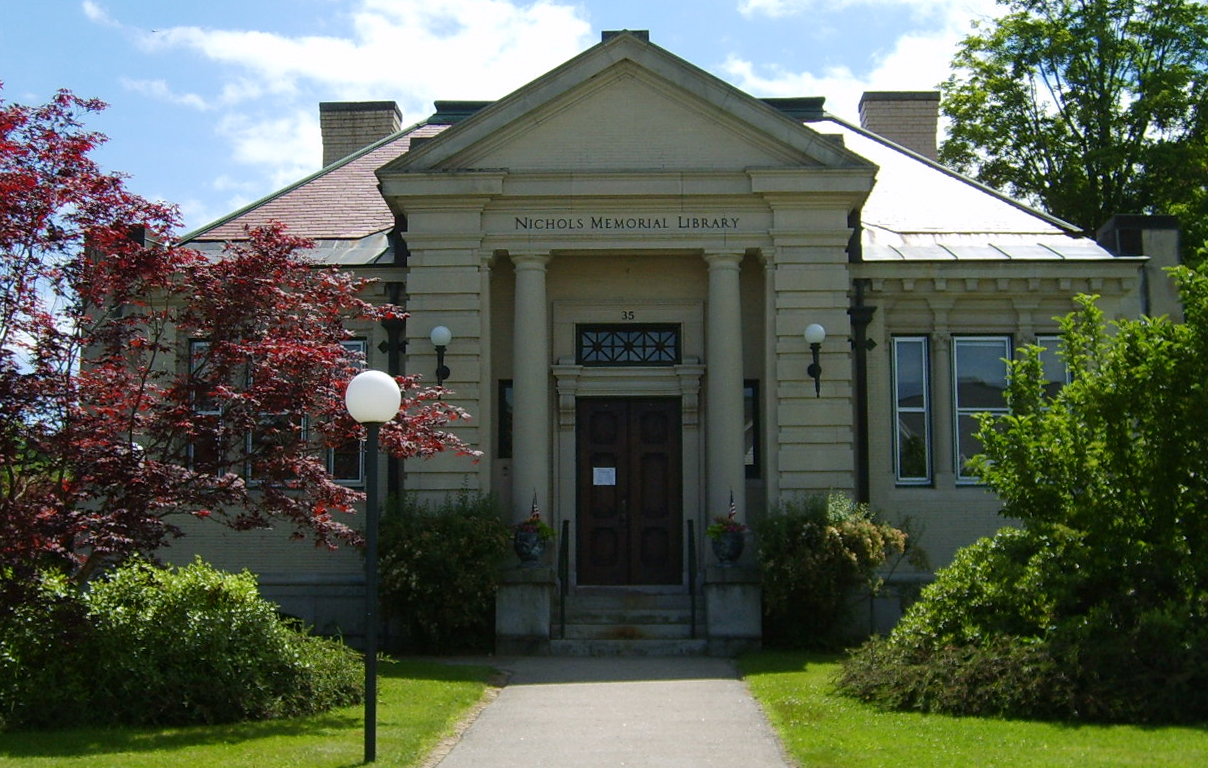
Nichols Memorial Library, 2007
