= Grand Coteau, Louisiana =

Town in Louisiana

- Town
- Town of Grand Coteau
- Location of Grand Coteau in St. Landry Parish, Louisiana.

- Location of Louisiana in the United States
- Coordinates: 30°25′13″N 92°02′38″W
- Country: United States
- State: Louisiana
- Parish: St. Landry

Area
  - Total: 2.42 sq mi (6.27 km^{2})
  - Land: 2.42 sq mi (6.27 km^{2})
  - Water: 0 sq mi (0.00 km^{2})
- Elevation: 56 ft (17 m)

Population (2020)
  - Total: 776
  - Density: 320.3/sq mi (123.67/km^{2})
- Time zone: UTC-6 (CST)
  - Summer (DST): UTC-5 (CDT)
- Area code: 337
- FIPS code: 22-30760
- GNIS feature ID: 2406598

Grand Coteau is a town in St. Landry Parish, Louisiana, United States. As of the 2020 census, Grand Coteau had a population of 776. Grand Coteau is on Interstate 49 south of Opelousas and is part of the Opelousas–Eunice Micropolitan Statistical Area. The town is a center for local farming.

== History ==
The first known land grant by the colonial Louisiana government was in 1776 in the area referred to as Buzzard Prairie. In the early 19th century, Buzzard Prairie served as a stopping point for travelers between Washington, Louisiana, and St. Martinville, Louisiana. The thriving community had two bakeries, a cobbler, a millinery, a blacksmith shop, a post office, six bars, and nine brothels.

In 1821, Mrs. Charles Smith, widow of a wealthy planter in Opelousas, donated land, a two-story building, and funds to pay for the travel expenses of two nuns from St. Charles, Missouri. The two nuns of the Religious of the Sacred Heart founded a convent and a school that became the Academy of the Sacred Heart.

The Jesuits arrived in 1837 when St. Charles College was built. The settlement that grew up around the schools was called St. Charles Town before it was changed to Grand Coteau. Grand Coteau is derived from the French meaning "great hill."

On October 3, 1863, the Campaign of the Teche was commenced. The Ninety-ninth infantry regiment of Illinois was in several skirmishes, and a detachment of the regiment, Captain A. C. Mathews commanding, was engaged in the Battle of Grand Coteau. On November 9, they moved on to New Orleans. Although thousands of Union troops were encamped in the fields surrounding the Academy during the Civil War, the school was not touched.

In the 19th century the population of Grand Coteau grew with African Americans, free people of color, Acadians, Creoles, French, Irish, and German immigrants. The town retains examples of Victorian architecture from its mid-19th-century boom.

Grand Coteau was home to Sacred Heart Colored School and St. Peter Claver High School.

== Demographics ==
Historical population
Census	Pop.	Note	%±
1870	470		—
1880	302		−35.7%
1890	333		10.3%
1900	521		56.5%
1910	392		−24.8%
1920	470		19.9%
1930	580		23.4%
1940	662		14.1%
1950	1,103		66.6%
1960	1,165		5.6%
1970	1,301		11.7%
1980	1,165		−10.5%
1990	1,118		−4.0%
2000	1,040		−7.0%
2010	947		−8.9%
2020	776		−18.1%
2025 (est.)	759	▼	−2.2%
U.S. Decennial Census

=== 2020 census ===
Grand Coteau racial composition
Race	Number	Percentage
White (non-Hispanic)	247	31.83%
Black or African American (non-Hispanic)	483	62.24%
Native American	1	0.13%
Asian	1	0.13%
Other/Mixed	19	2.45%
Hispanic or Latino	25	3.22%

As of the 2020 United States census, there were 776 people, 296 households, and 182 families residing in the town.

=== 2010 census ===
As of the 2010 United States census, there were 947 people living in the town. The racial makeup of the town was 71.0% Black, 26.0% White, 0.1% Asian, 0.1% from some other race and 0.6% from two or more races. 2.2% were Hispanic or Latino of any race.

=== 2000 census ===
As of the census of 2000, there were 1,040 people, 377 households, and 260 families living in the town. The population density was 427.1 inhabitants per square mile (164.9/km^{2}). There were 407 housing units at an average density of 167.1 per square mile (64.5/km^{2}). The racial makeup of the town was 30.77% White, 67.69% African American, 0.19% Native American, 0.29% Asian, 0.10% Pacific Islander, 0.10% from other races, and 0.87% from two or more races. Hispanic or Latino of any race were 1.83% of the population.

There were 377 households, out of which 32.6% had children under the age of 18 living with them, 39.3% were married couples living together, 24.1% had a female householder with no husband present, and 31.0% were non-families. 27.1% of all households were made up of individuals, and 12.7% had someone living alone who was 65 years of age or older. The average household size was 2.69 and the average family size was 3.32.

In the town, the population was spread out, with 29.7% under the age of 18, 7.4% from 18 to 24, 27.2% from 25 to 44, 22.4% from 45 to 64, and 13.3% who were 65 years of age or older. The median age was 36 years. For every 100 females, there were 87.4 males. For every 100 females age 18 and over, there were 84.1 males.

The median income for a household in the town was $19,943, and the median income for a family was $26,528. Males had a median income of $21,992 versus $16,000 for females. The per capita income for the town was $9,728. About 25.2% of families and 29.2% of the population were below the poverty line, including 39.6% of those under age 18 and 19.9% of those age 65 or over.

== Geography ==
According to the United States Census Bureau, the town has a total area of 2.4 square miles (6.2 km^{2}), all land.

=== Climate ===
The climate in this area is characterized by hot, humid summers and generally mild to cool winters. According to the Köppen Climate Classification system, Grand Coteau has a humid subtropical climate, abbreviated "Cfa" on climate maps.

Climate data for Grand Coteau, Louisiana (1991–2020 normals, extremes 1893–2024)
Month	Jan	Feb	Mar	Apr	May	Jun	Jul	Aug	Sep	Oct	Nov	Dec	Year
Record high °F (°C)	85 (29)	90 (32)	90 (32)	100 (38)	100 (38)	105 (41)	104 (40)	107 (42)	106 (41)	98 (37)	91 (33)	86 (30)	107 (42)
Mean maximum °F (°C)	76.6 (24.8)	79.1 (26.2)	83.0 (28.3)	87.2 (30.7)	92.0 (33.3)	95.3 (35.2)	96.3 (35.7)	97.4 (36.3)	94.4 (34.7)	90.2 (32.3)	83.4 (28.6)	79.0 (26.1)	98.2 (36.8)
Mean daily maximum °F (°C)	63.5 (17.5)	67.2 (19.6)	73.5 (23.1)	79.4 (26.3)	85.5 (29.7)	90.2 (32.3)	91.6 (33.1)	92.0 (33.3)	88.3 (31.3)	81.2 (27.3)	71.4 (21.9)	65.1 (18.4)	79.1 (26.2)
Daily mean °F (°C)	52.5 (11.4)	56.0 (13.3)	62.1 (16.7)	68.1 (20.1)	75.0 (23.9)	80.3 (26.8)	82.1 (27.8)	82.1 (27.8)	78.0 (25.6)	69.5 (20.8)	59.9 (15.5)	54.2 (12.3)	68.3 (20.2)
Mean daily minimum °F (°C)	41.4 (5.2)	44.7 (7.1)	50.7 (10.4)	56.8 (13.8)	64.5 (18.1)	70.4 (21.3)	72.6 (22.6)	72.3 (22.4)	67.7 (19.8)	57.8 (14.3)	48.3 (9.1)	43.3 (6.3)	57.5 (14.2)
Mean minimum °F (°C)	23.8 (−4.6)	28.7 (−1.8)	32.1 (0.1)	39.7 (4.3)	51.2 (10.7)	63.2 (17.3)	67.3 (19.6)	66.3 (19.1)	55.1 (12.8)	40.5 (4.7)	30.5 (−0.8)	26.6 (−3.0)	22.0 (−5.6)
Record low °F (°C)	2 (−17)	2 (−17)	20 (−7)	30 (−1)	42 (6)	53 (12)	58 (14)	58 (14)	42 (6)	29 (−2)	20 (−7)	8 (−13)	2 (−17)
Average precipitation inches (mm)	6.54 (166)	4.51 (115)	3.75 (95)	5.34 (136)	5.72 (145)	6.97 (177)	4.41 (112)	4.36 (111)	5.14 (131)	5.04 (128)	4.97 (126)	4.88 (124)	61.63 (1,565)
Average precipitation days (≥ 0.01 in)	9.4	8.1	7.9	7.0	8.4	10.4	10.4	10.2	10.3	7.7	8.8	10.1	108.7
Source: NOAA
