= Nesivos Hatalmud =

- נתיבות התלמוד
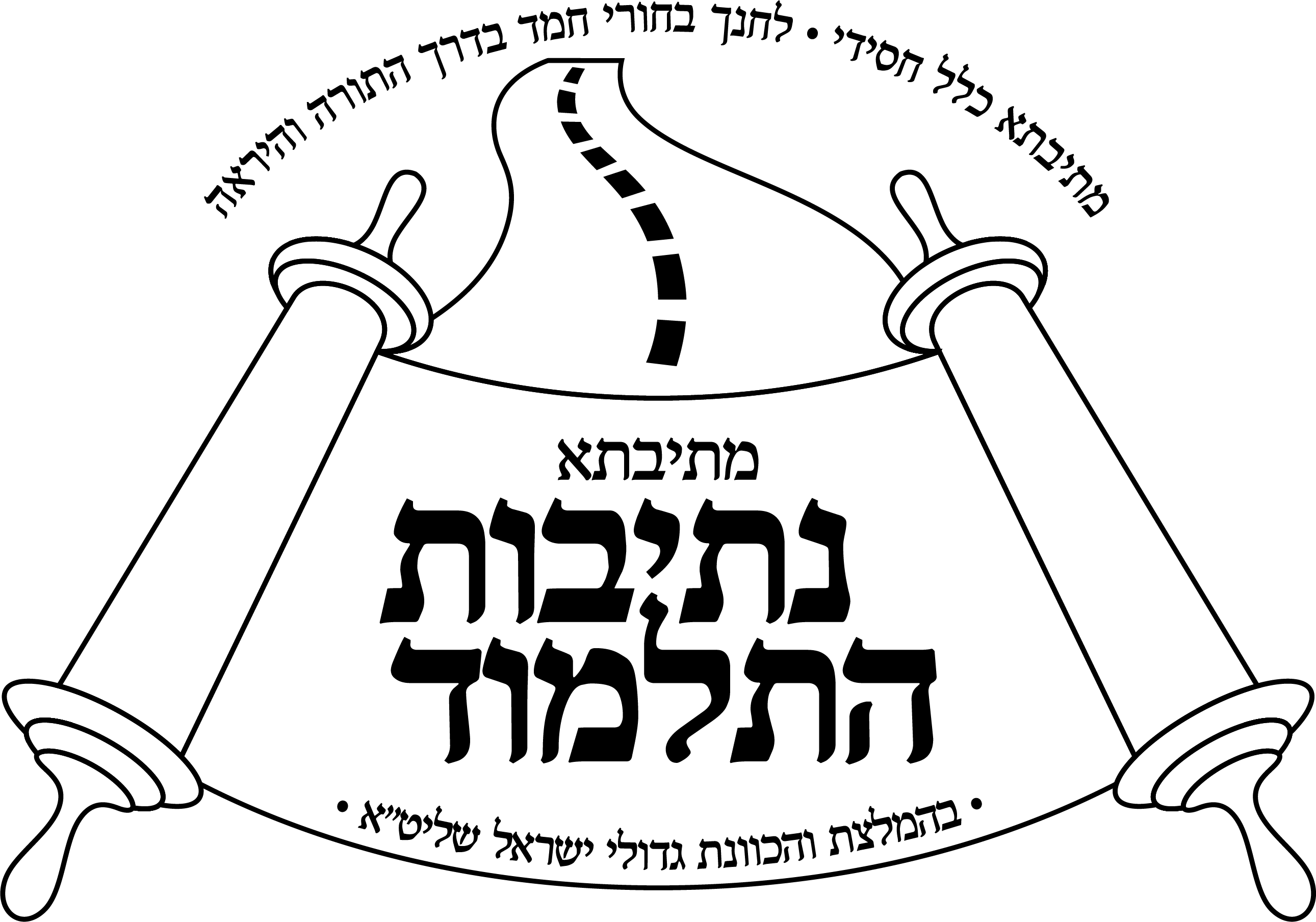

Location
- 1228 36 St. Brooklyn, N.Y. United States
- 40.643005°N 73.986353°W

Information
- Type: Yeshiva
- Motto: מתיבתא כלל חסידי לחנך בחורי חמד בדרך התורה והיראה
- Religious affiliation: Orthodox
- NCES District ID: A1502538
- Grades: 8th grade - 12th grade
- Gender: Male
  - Grade 8: 10
  - Grade 9: 24
  - Grade 10: 28
  - Grade 11: 24
  - Grade 12: 26
- Student to teacher ratio: 12.7
- Nickname: Nesivos

Mesivta Nesivos Hatalmud, is a Yeshiva based in the Borough Park area of Brooklyn, N.Y. It was founded in 2005 by Rabbi Shmuel Mordechai Wolner, who currently serves as the Rosh Yeshiva. In winter 2014, he established Yeshiva Gedolah Nesivos Hatalmud.

Their summer camp is in Camp Na-Sho-Pa in Mamakating, New York.
