= Eagle Academy for Young Men of Newark =

Middle / high school in Newark, New Jersey, United States

Location
- 279 Chancellor Avenue; Newark, Essex County, New Jersey 07112; United States
- 40.7093579°N 74.2201619°W

Information
- Type: Public middle / high school
- Established: September 2012
- NCES School ID: 341134003227
- Principal: Semone Morant
- Faculty: 20.0 FTEs
- Grades: 5–12
- Enrollment: 172 (as of 2023–24)
- Student to teacher ratio: 8.6:1
- Campus: Urban
- Website: www.eaglenewark.com

Eagle Academy for Young Men of Newark is an all-boys' public school in Newark in Essex County, in the U.S. state of New Jersey, operating as part of the Newark Public Schools. The Eagle Academy Foundation supports the educational programs of this school and other all-boys' schools in New York City. As of 2012, Eagle Academy of Newark is the only all-boys' public school in the State of New Jersey. It is Newark's first single-gender public school; it has a university preparatory curriculum and has small class sizes. It is located in the Louise A. Spencer School complex in the Central Ward.

As of the 2023–24 school year, the school had an enrollment of 172 students and 20.0 classroom teachers (on an FTE basis), for a student–teacher ratio of 8.6:1. There were 113 students (65.7% of enrollment) eligible for free lunch and 17 (9.9% of students) eligible for reduced-cost lunch.

== History ==
In September 2012 the school opened with 80 students in the 6th grade, with new grade added each year until the school became a grade 6-12 school. The school anticipated having about 500 students total once the grade levels are maxed out. The first principal was Vaughn Thompson, who had previously worked at the Young Scholars Academy of Bronx and had resigned from there.

In 2012, the American Civil Liberties Union of New Jersey stated that if boys have a single gender school, girls should have the same opportunity. NPS later opened Girls' Academy of Newark as the all-girl counterpart.

== Administration ==
The school's principal is Semone Morant.
