= Schools of the Sacred Heart (Louisiana) =

Catholic school in Louisiana

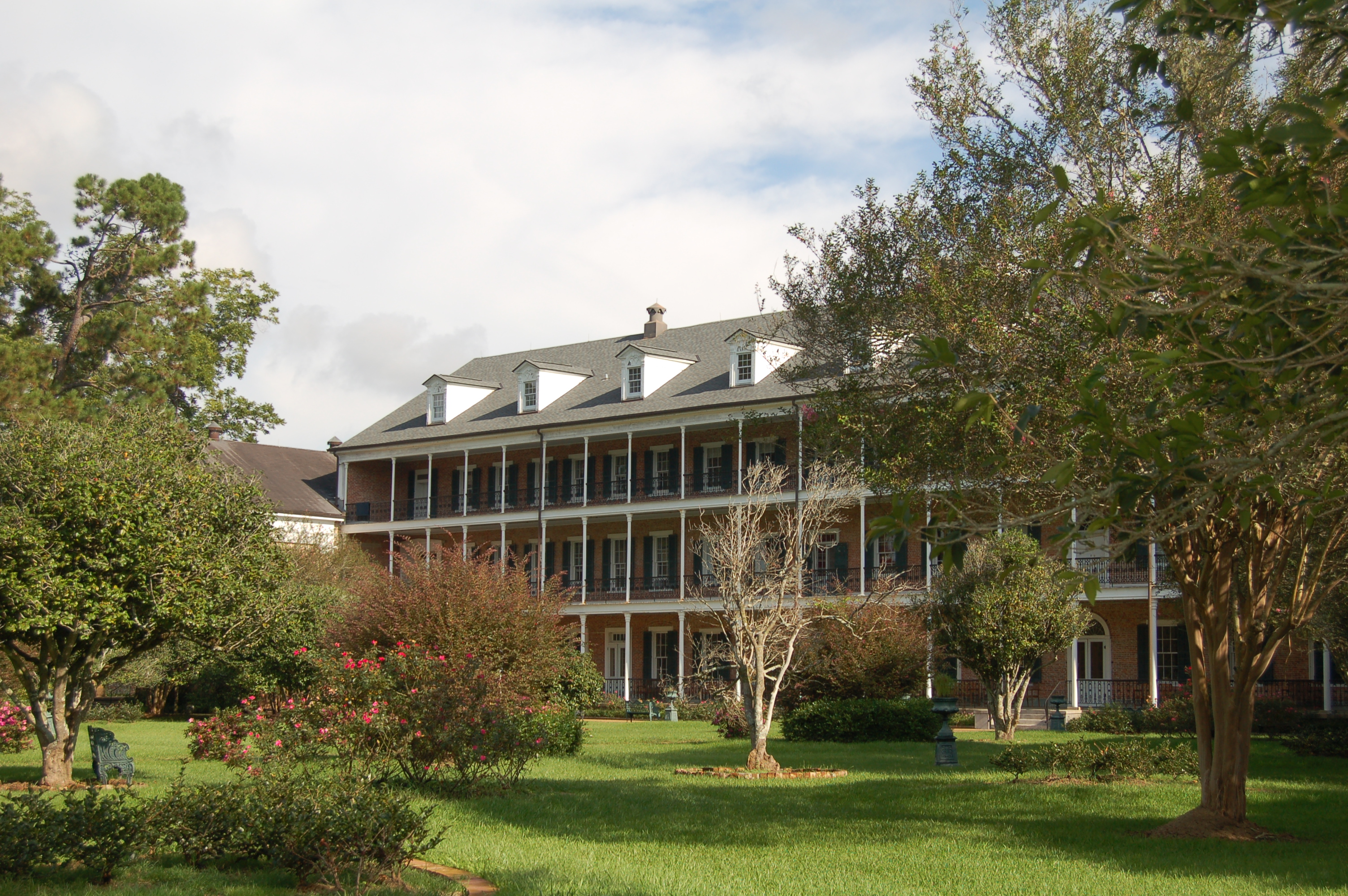

Location
- 1821 Academy Road; Grand Coteau, (St. Landry Parish), Louisiana 70541; United States; 30°25′7″N 92°2′37″W

Information
- Type: Private, Day & Boarding
- Religious affiliations: Roman Catholic, Society of the Sacred Heart
- Established: 1821; 205 years ago
- Head of School: Yvonne Sandoz Adler, Ph.D.
- Division Heads: Angela Hymel, Angie Boagni
- Deans of Students: Lauren LaFosse, Chris Garvey
- Grades: PK3–12
- Gender: Girls (Academy of the Sacred Heart) and Boys (Berchmans)
- Campus size: 250 acres (1.0 km^{2})
- Houses: Stuart, Barat, Duchesne, and Hardy
- Colors: Red and White
- Mascot: Saints
- Accreditation: Louisiana State Department of Education; Independent Schools Association of the Southwest (ISAS); AdvancED
- Affiliation: Sacred Heart Network
- Website: www.ash1821.org

Schools of the Sacred Heart is a complex of two Catholic single-sex private schools for grades pre-kindergarten-3 through grade 12 in Grand Coteau, Louisiana. It operates independently within the Diocese of Lafayette.

The Academy of the Sacred Heart, is a PK3–12 girls' school founded in 1821 Its brother school, Berchmans Academy, is a PK3 through 12 boys' school founded in 2006. The campus also included the Normal College of the Sacred Heart from 1917 to 1939 and the College of the Sacred Heart from 1939 to 1956

== History ==
The Academy of the Sacred Heart was established in 1821 and is the second oldest institution of learning west of the Mississippi. It was founded under the direction of Saint Philippine Duchesne. It officially opened on October 5, 1821. It had five boarding students.

The school initially operated from a two-story frame building on property donated by Mrs. Charles Smith. As its enrollment grew, the school's facilities expanded. A three-story brick building was added in 1831 and a chapel was added in 1851.

Sacred Heart has continuously operated since its founding, despite fire, epidemics, and the Civil War. Although thousands of federal troops were encamped in the fields surrounding the academy during the Civil War, the school was not touched. Union General Nathaniel Banks had a daughter in a school in New York run by the Religious of the Sacred Heart, and he was asked to look after the Grand Coteau sisters and their students.

In 1914, the academy renewed and expanded its charter with the State of Louisiana, allowing it to grant college degrees. In 1916, its college received accreditation from the Louisiana State Board of Education. It started a two-year "normal" or teacher education program in 1917.

In 1922, Sacred Heart was advertised as the Normal College and Academy of the Sacred Heart, having both an accredited high school and a board-certified college. The College of the Sacred Heart awarded its graduates with a Professional Elementary Certificate, allowing them to teach public schools in Louisiana.

In 1938, the college campus was expanded to include an administrative building, an auditorium, classrooms, and a dormitory in the Louisiana Colonial style. Under the leadership of Sr. Marjory Erskine, superior of the Convent of the Sacred Heart, the normal school became a four-year College of the Sacred Heart in 1939. Erskine was the college's president. The college had a chapter of the Delta Epsilon Sigma Catholic honor society, of which, Erskine was active. The college division closed in 1956.

After Hurricane Katrina in 2005, the academy hosted the satellite location for Academy of the Sacred Heart of the Rosary in New Orleans, and its students housed many of the dislocated students from New Orleans.

In 2006, Sacred Heart opened a boys division, Berchmans Academy, for boys in grades PK3 through 2nd grade. Berchmans Academy currently accommodates boys in PK3 through 12th grade. In 2006, the administration decided to rename the institution that runs both the Academy of the Sacred Heart and Berchmans Academy to Schools of the Sacred Heart, Grand Coteau. In 2016, Yvonne Sandoz Adler, Ph.D. became the new head of the schools.

In 2025, the academy closed its boarding school program for girls. The school is the oldest, continually running member of the Network of Sacred Heart Schools in the world. It is also the oldest independent school in the Acadiana region.

== Campus ==
The Schools of the Sacred Heart is located on 250 acres in Grand Coteau, St. Landry Parish, Louisiana. The grounds feature formal gardens and an oak alley.

The campus includes the Shrine of St. John Berchmans. St. John Berchmans appeared to a novice, Mary Wilson, and cured her of a fatal illness. This miracle eventually led to the canonization of John Berchmans. It is the only shrine at the exact location of a confirmed miracle in the United States.

The campus was listed on the National Register of Historic Places on February 18, 1975.

== Academics ==
=== Curriculum ===
The Schools of the Sacred Heart follows the mission and charism of Saint Madeleine Sophie Barat and the Society of the Sacred Heart. Its educational program teaches "students to be individuals of faith, intellect, service, and justice".

The academy offers a strong, diversified curriculum. The Lower School is divided into Primary (grades Pre-K3 through 4th) and Prep (grades 5th through 7th). Upper School includes grades 8 through 12. Lower and Prep School students study art studio, music, guidance, and art appreciation in addition to the more traditional subjects. Private music lessons are available.

The Academy also hosts many international students (including Foreign Exchange students) in its boarding facilities and has an English as a Second Language Program.

=== Accreditation and memberships ===
The academy is accredited by the Louisiana State Department of Education Independent Schools Association of the Southwest (ISAS) and AdvencED. The Academy of the Sacred Heart is a member of the National Association of Independent Schools (NAIS) and the Network of Sacred Heart Schools. The academy is also a member of the National Catholic Education Association.

== Student life ==
Upper-grade students participate in a wide variety of extracurricular activities including athletics, student community governance, performance art, clubs, and community service. The academy has an equestrian program with its Sacred Heart Stables, available for students wishing to bring their horses.

The academy's athletics teams are called the Saints. The school colors are red and white.

== Notable alumni ==
- Lucille May Grace (Class of 1919), Louisiana Register of the State Lands, 1931-1952; 1956-1957
- Salma Hayek, actress

== See also ==
- List of boarding schools in the United States
- List of boys' schools in the United States
- List of girls' schools in the United States
- List of Schools of the Sacred Heart
- National Register of Historic Places listings in St. Landry Parish, Louisiana
- Roman Catholic Diocese of Lafayette in Louisiana
- Society of the Sacred Heart
