= Ginn Academy =

Coordinates: 41.5635°N 81.5669°W

Location
- 655 East 162nd Street; Cleveland, (Cuyahoga County), Ohio 44110; United States

Information
- Type: Public, All boys
- Established: 2007
- Status: Active
- Superintendent: Dr. Warren Morgan
- Director: Ted Ginn
- Principal: Damon Holmes
- Grades: 9-12
- Website: clevelandmetroschools.org

Ginn Academy is an all-boys' public high school located in Cleveland, Ohio. A part of the Cleveland Metropolitan School District, Ginn began instruction in 2007 opening in the building previously occupied by Spellacy Middle School in the city's South Collinwood neighborhood. It is the only all-boys' public high school in the state. It was founded by Glenville High School football and track coach Ted Ginn Sr.

Ginn Academy was designed for boys requiring additional help in academics and services, and it was scheduled to have a school day longer than that of most district high schools. The school, in its opening year, had 100 slots for first year students (freshmen) and 50 second year students (sophomores). As of December 2007, 80 students had applied.

The dress code requires students to wear suits and ties, different from the normal Cleveland school district dress code guidelines.

== Notable alumni ==
- Cardale Jones, American football player
