= Immaculate Conception Apostolic School =

Location
- 109 Dane Road; Center Harbor, (Belknap County), New Hampshire 03226; United States; 43°42′43″N 71°28′26″W

Information
- Type: Private boarding school
- Motto: Adveniat Regnum Tuum
- Religious affiliation: Roman Catholic
- Patron saint: Blessed Virgin Mary
- Established: 1982
- Closed: 2015
- Rector: Fr. Timothy Walsh
- Grades: 7–12
- Colors: Cardinal and white
- Academic Dean: Fr. Steven Liscinsky
- Choirmaster: Bruce Heald

Established in 1982, Immaculate Conception Apostolic School (ICAS) was a private Roman Catholic boarding school for boys in grades seven through twelve. It was located within the Diocese of Manchester and run by the Legionaries of Christ, a religious congregation of the Roman Catholic Church. The school buildings still stand haunting Lake Winnipesaukee in the central New Hampshire town of Center Harbor. It served approximately 130 students at its heyday. It closed permanently in June 2015.

== Background ==
The school was formerly a minor seminary and novitiate of the Missionaries of La Salette. The property was purchased by the Legionaries of Christ in 1982, and since that time until its closing in 2015, the school expanded and continued in its purpose to provide religious and academic instruction for boys. While some students continued on to a seminary after graduation, many pursued college or university degrees. Students came from throughout the United States and from several countries around the world including Canada, Mexico, Australia, New Zealand, France, Germany, South Korea, and South Africa.

== Academics ==
The academic program followed a classical liberal arts model with particular attention to classical (Latin and Greek) and modern foreign languages, British and American literature, mathematics and the natural sciences, history, theology, cultural studies, and the fine arts (vocal music, theater arts/communication, and mass media and video production). The Latin and Greek courses, in particular, encouraged all students to be able to read Virgil's Aeneid in the original Latin and be able to translate the Gospel of John from the original Greek by senior year. The mathematics program begins with pre-algebra and extends to Trigonometry and Calculus with emphasis in theory rather than application. Students were required to take Spanish as a modern foreign language. Each student was also required to participate in the school’s band and choir program. Students also participated in service to the community in order to graduate.

== Spirituality ==
Religious services such as the Holy Mass, Rosary, and Benediction of the Blessed Sacrament were provided regularly for the students. Students were introduced to Catholic spirituality which takes different elements from various spiritual authors.

== Athletics ==
Athletic activities were numerous and included basketball, soccer, hockey and baseball. Outdoor and recreational activities were also provided such as hiking expeditions in the White Mountains and seasonal opportunities for swimming, boating, skiing, and sledding.
