= New York State Association of Independent Schools Athletic Association =

The New York State Association of Independent Schools Athletic Association (NYSAISAA) is a sports association for independent schools in New York state. It is overseen by the New York State Association of Independent Schools. The Association conducts championships in various sports each year, some of which serve as qualifiers for overall state championships conducted with public and catholic schools.

== List of schools ==
As of July 1, 2015, the following schools were members in good standing. All schools are located in the New York City borough of Manhattan unless otherwise noted.

- Abraham Joshua Heschel School
- Albany Academies in Albany
- Berkeley Carroll School in Park Slope, Brooklyn
- Brearley School
- Buffalo Seminary in Buffalo
- Chapin School
- Collegiate School
- Columbia Grammar & Preparatory School
- Convent of the Sacred Heart
- Cristo Rey New York High School
- Dalton School
- Doane Stuart School in Rensselaer
- Dwight School
- Ethical Culture Fieldston School in Manhattan, New York and Riverdale, Bronx
- Friends Academy in Locust Valley
- Friends Seminary
- Green Meadow Waldorf School in Chestnut Ridge
- Hackley School in Tarrytown
- Harley School in Rochester
- Harvey School in Katonah
- Horace Mann School in Riverdale, Bronx
- Immaculata Academy in Hamburg
- Kew-Forest School in Forest Hills, Queens
- Knox School in St. James
- Lawrence Woodmere Academy in Woodmere
- Léman Manhattan Preparatory School
- Long Island Lutheran Middle and High School in Brookville
- Loyola School
- Lycée Français de New York
- Martin Luther High School in Maspeth, Queens
- Marymount School
- Nichols School in Buffalo
- Nightingale-Bamford School
- Northwood School in Lake Placid
- Notre Dame School
- Packer Collegiate Institute in Brooklyn Heights, Brooklyn
- Park School of Buffalo in Amherst
- Poly Prep Country Day School in Dyker Heights and Park Slope, Brooklyn
- Portledge School in Locust Valley
- Riverdale Country School in Riverdale, Bronx
- Rye Country Day School in Rye
- SAR High School in Riverdale, Bronx
- Schechter School of Long Island in Glen Cove
- School of the Holy Child in Rye
- Spence School
- Staten Island Academy in Staten Island
- Stony Brook School in Stony Brook
- Trevor Day School
- Trinity School
- Tuxedo Park School in Tuxedo Park
- United Nations International School
- Waldorf School of Garden City
- Xavier High School
- York Preparatory School
- The Birch Wathen Lenox School

== Sports offered ==
NYSAISAA offers championship competition in the following sports:

Fall:

- Cross-country (boys and girls)
- Field hockey (girls)
- Soccer (boys and girls)
- Volleyball (girls)

Winter:

- Basketball (boys and girls)
- Indoor track and field (boys and girls)
- Squash (boys and girls)
- Swimming (boys and girls)
- Wrestling (boys)

Spring:

- Baseball (boys)
- Golf (boys)
- Lacrosse (boys and girls)
- Softball (girls)
- Track and field (boys and girls)
- Volleyball (boys)

== Championship teams ==
Results through Winter 2025.

Fall sports:

Year	Cross-country (boys)	Cross-country (girls)	Field hockey (girls)	Soccer (boys)	Soccer (girls)	Volleyball (girls)
1984	Horace Mann	Horace Mann				
1985	Collegiate	Horace Mann				
1986	Collegiate	Horace Mann				
1987	Collegiate	Horace Mann				
1988	Collegiate	Horace Mann				
1989	Collegiate	Horace Mann				
1990	Collegiate	Horace Mann				
1991	Collegiate	Horace Mann				
1992	Collegiate	Horace Mann				
1993	Collegiate	Horace Mann				
1994	Collegiate	Convent of the Sacred Heart				
1995	Collegiate	Brearley				
1996	Horace Mann	Brearley			Riverdale	
1997	Collegiate	Horace Mann		Brooklyn Friends	Nichols	Trinity
1998	Collegiate	Packer Collegiate		Nichols	Nichols	Poly Prep
1999	Collegiate	Packer Collegiate		Riverdale	Hackley	Dalton
2000	Collegiate	Packer Collegiate		Horace Mann	Nichols	Fieldston
2001	Collegiate	Poly Prep		Hackley	Packer Collegiate	Fieldston
2002	Collegiate	Brearley		Horace Mann	Hackley	Fieldston
2003	Collegiate	Horace Mann	Hackley	Nichols	Riverdale	Poly Prep
2004	Collegiate	Brearley	Rye Country Day	Nichols	Hackley	Chapin
2005	Collegiate	Brearley	Nichols	Horace Mann	Hackley	Brearley
2006	Collegiate	Brearley	Holy Child	Riverdale	Hackley	Saint Ann's
2007	Collegiate	Brearley	Rye Country Day	Poly Prep	Riverdale	Immaculata Academy
2008	Collegiate	Brearley	Holy Child	Poly Prep	Hackley	Spence
2009	Collegiate	Brearley	Rye Country Day	Dalton	Trinity	Spence
2010	Collegiate	Brearley	Nichols	Collegiate	Riverdale	Brearley
2011	Collegiate	Brearley	Rye Country Day	Collegiate	Riverdale	Fieldston
2012	Collegiate	Nightingale-Bamford	Rye Country Day	Collegiate	Horace Mann	Trinity
2013	Collegiate	Hackley	Rye Country Day	Hackley	Holy Child	Spence
2014	Collegiate	Hackley	Rye Country Day	Riverdale	Rye Country Day	Fieldston
2015	Collegiate	Hackley	Hackley	Riverdale	Hackley	Fieldston
2016	Trinity	Poly Prep	Rye Country Day	Friends Seminary	Dalton	Marymount
2017	Trinity	Convent of the Sacred Heart	Rye Country Day	Trinity	Dalton	Marymount
2018	Trinity	Poly Prep	Rye Country Day	Trinity	Poly Prep	Poly Prep
2019	Hackley	Trinity	Rye Country Day	Fieldston	Poly Prep	Poly Prep
2020	None due to the COVID-19 pandemic.					
2021	Collegiate	Dalton	No tournament	Masters	Fieldston	Poly Prep
2022	Trinity	Convent of the Sacred Heart	Rye Country Day	Hackley	Poly Prep	Poly Prep
2023	Hackley	Riverdale	Rye Country Day	Horace Mann	Horace Mann	Fieldston
2024	Riverdale	Spence	Fieldston	Riverdale	Brearley	Saint Ann's
2025	Poly Prep	Spence	Rye Country Day	Riverdale	Poly Prep	Poly Prep

Winter sports:

Year	Basketball (boys)	Basketball (girls)
1992		Convent of the Sacred Heart
1993	Fieldston	Staten Island Academy
1994	Long Island Lutheran	Nichols
1995	Nichols	Marymount
1996	Collegiate	Riverdale
1997	Adelphi Academy	Nichols
1998	Dwight	Riverdale
1999	Lawrence Woodmere Academy	Poly Prep
2000	Poly Prep	Horace Mann
2001	Dalton	Dwight
2002	Lawrence Woodmere Academy	Poly Prep
2003	Brooklyn Friends	Poly Prep
2004	Poly Prep	Poly Prep

Starting in the 2004-05 season, basketball championships were awarded by divisions. Class AA, Class A and Class B champions qualified for the New York State Federation Tournament of Champions.

Year	Basketball (boys) (AA)	Basketball (boys) (A)	Basketball (boys) (B)	Basketball (boys) (C)	Basketball (girls) (AA)	Basketball (girls) (A)	Basketball (girls) (B)	Basketball (girls) (C)
2005		Lawrence Woodmere Academy	Fieldston	Martin Luther			Nichols	Poly Prep
2006		Lawrence Woodmere Academy	Collegiate	Friends Seminary			Immaculata Academy	Poly Prep
2007		Long Island Lutheran	Upper Room Christian	Trinity			Fieldston	Immaculata Academy
2008		Long Island Lutheran	Collegiate	Masters			Fieldston	Hackley
2009		Long Island Lutheran	Collegiate	Trinity			Long Island Lutheran	Rye Country Day
2010		Long Island Lutheran	Collegiate	Rye Country Day			Long Island Lutheran	Rye Country Day
2011		Long Island Lutheran	Collegiate	Columbia Prep			Long Island Lutheran	Staten Island Academy
2012		Long Island Lutheran	Collegiate	Rye Country Day			Long Island Lutheran	Hackley
2013	Long Island Lutheran	Albany Academy	Riverdale	Masters		Long Island Lutheran		Hackley
2014	Long Island Lutheran	Albany Academy	Dwight	Rye Country Day		Long Island Lutheran	Staten Island Academy	Hackley
2015	Long Island Lutheran	Albany Academy	Dwight	Berkeley Carroll		Long Island Lutheran	Staten Island Academy	Rye Country Day
2016	Long Island Lutheran	Albany Academy	Collegiate	Packer Collegiate Institute	Long Island Lutheran	Staten Island Academy		Dalton
2017	Long Island Lutheran	Albany Academy	Dwight	Lawrence Woodmere Academy	Long Island Lutheran	Staten Island Academy		Rye Country Day
2018	Long Island Lutheran	Albany Academy	Lawrence Woodmere Academy	Masters	Long Island Lutheran	Staten Island Academy		Dalton
2019	Long Island Lutheran	Albany Academy	Lawrence Woodmere Academy	Rye Country Day	Long Island Lutheran	Staten Island Academy		Masters
2020	Long Island Lutheran	Albany Academy	Poly Prep	Friends Seminary	Long Island Lutheran	Staten Island Academy		Horace Mann
2021	None due to the COVID-19 pandemic.							
2022	Long Island Lutheran	Albany Academy	Poly Prep	York Prep	Long Island Lutheran	Staten Island Academy		Dalton
2023	Long Island Lutheran	Albany Academy	Poly Prep	Trinity	Long Island Lutheran	Staten Island Academy		Dalton
2024			Poly Prep	Fieldston			Dalton	Poly Prep
2025			Albany Academy	Collegiate			Dalton	Rye Country Day
2026			Stony Brook	Fieldston			Stony Brook	Nightingale-Bamford

Year	Wrestling (boys)	Indoor track and field (boys)	Indoor track and field (girls)	Squash (boys)	Squash (girls)	Swimming (boys)	Swimming (girls)
2017	Poly Prep						
2018	Poly Prep	Trinity	Poly Prep				
2019	Horace Mann	Trinity	Poly Prep	Hackley			
2020	Horace Mann	Poly Prep and Trinity (tie)	Trinity	Poly Prep	Spence	Trinity	Trinity
2021	None due to the COVID-19 pandemic.						
2022	Collegiate	Trinity	Trinity	Rye Country Day	Spence	Trinity	Convent of the Sacred Heart
2023	Poly Prep	Trinity	Poly Prep	Rye Country Day	Spence	Trinity	Convent of the Sacred Heart
2024	Poly Prep	Poly Prep	Poly Prep	Rye Country Day	Hackley	Trinity	Convent of the Sacred Heart
2025	Poly Prep and Collegiate (tie)	Riverdale Country	Nightingale-Bamford	Rye Country Day	Spence	Horace Mann	Nightingale-Bamford
2026	Poly Prep	Riverdale Country	Spence	Rye Country Day	Rye Country Day	Trinity	Hackley

Spring sports:

Year	Baseball (boys)	Golf (boys)	Lacrosse (boys)	Lacrosse (girls)	Softball (girls)	Track and field (boys)	Track and field (girls)	Volleyball (boys)
1998					Poly Prep			
1999					Poly Prep			
2000	Riverdale				Horace Mann			
2001	Hackley	Nichols			Hackley			
2002	Poly Prep	Nichols			Horace Mann			
2003	Rye Country Day	Poly Prep			Horace Mann	Poly Prep	Poly Prep	
2004	Rye Country Day	Nichols		Hackley	Horace Mann	Collegiate	Poly Prep	
2005	Collegiate	Nichols		Hackley	Fieldston	Collegiate	Poly Prep	
2006	Trinity	Rye Country Day		Hackley	Poly Prep	Collegiate	Horace Mann	
2007	Poly Prep	Rye Country Day		Rye Country Day	Poly Prep	Collegiate	Horace Mann	
2008	Poly Prep	Rye Country Day		Hackley	Poly Prep	Collegiate	Dalton	
2009	Berkeley Carroll	Rye Country Day		Hackley	Poly Prep	Hackley	Brearley	
2010	Collegiate	Rye Country Day	Rye Country Day	Portledge	Poly Prep	Hackley	Brearley	
2011	Poly Prep	Rye Country Day	Poly Prep	Riverdale	Poly Prep	Hackley	Brearley	
2012	Poly Prep	Fieldston	Hackley	Hackley	Holy Child	Hackley	Brearley	
2013	Poly Prep	Fieldston	Hackley	Hackley	Fieldston	Hackley	Hackley	
2014	Poly Prep	Fieldston	Hackley	Rye Country Day	Fieldston	Hackley	Hackley	
2015	Rye Country Day	Fieldston	Rye Country Day	Rye Country Day	Fieldston	Hackley	Hackley	
2016	Poly Prep	Fieldston	Hackley	Hackley	Poly Prep	Hackley	Hackley	
2017	Poly Prep	Hackley	Rye Country Day	Holy Child	Fieldston	Hackley	Poly Prep	
2018	Poly Prep	Hackley	Hackley	Hackley	Poly Prep	Hackley	Poly Prep	Calhoun
2019	Collegiate	Rye Country Day	Hackley	Hackley	Poly Prep	Rye Country Day	Poly Prep	Calhoun
2020	None due to the COVID-19 pandemic.							
2021	None due to the COVID-19 pandemic.							
2022	Poly Prep	Collegiate	Long Island Lutheran	Hackley	Poly Prep	Trinity	Dalton	Calhoun
2023	Poly Prep	Rye Country Day	Hackley	Hackley	Poly Prep	Poly Prep	Dalton	Calhoun
2024	Stony Brook	Collegiate	Poly Prep	Rye Country Day	Poly Prep	Poly Prep	Dalton	Trinity
2025	Fieldston	Horace Mann	Hackley	Rye Country Day	Poly Prep	Masters	Dalton	UNIS

== See also ==
- The following independent school sport leagues are also in New York state:
  - Ivy Preparatory School League
  - ISAL - Independent Schools Athletic League (New York)
  - GISAL - Girls Independent Schools Athletic League
  - PSAA - Private School Athletic Association
- New York state high school boys basketball championships
