= Independent Schools Athletic League =

The Independent Schools Athletic League (ISAL) is a sports league for independent high schools in New York state.

== Member schools ==
All schools are within the New York City borough of Manhattan unless otherwise noted.

- Bay Ridge Preparatory School in Bay Ridge, Brooklyn
- Birch Wathen Lenox School
- Brooklyn Friends School in Downtown Brooklyn
- Browning School
- Calhoun School
- Churchill School and Center
- Columbia Grammar and Preparatory School
- Dwight School
- French-American School of New York in Scarsdale, Larchmont, and Mamaroneck, New York
- Garden School in Jackson Heights, Queens
- Little Red School House and Elisabeth Irwin High School
- Loyola School
- Lycée Français de New York
- Rudolf Steiner School
- St. Hilda's & St. Hughes
- Trevor Day School
- United Nations International School
- Winston Preparatory School (Manhattan campus)
- York Preparatory School

=== Associate Members ===
- Staten Island Academy in Staten Island, New York
- Winston Preparatory School (Norwalk, Connecticut campus)

== See also ==
The following independent school sport leagues are also in New York state:

- GISAL - Girls Independent Schools Athletic League
- NYSAISAA - New York State Association of Independent Schools Athletic Association
- PSAA - Private School Athletic Association
