= Chapin School =

Private all-girls school in New York City

Location
- 100 East End Avenue; New York City, New York 10028; United States; 40°46′26″N 73°56′45″W

Information
- Type: Private; day; college preparatory
- Motto: Latin: Fortiter et Recte (Bravely and Rightly)
- Religious affiliation: Nonsectarian
- Established: 1901 (125 years ago)
- Chair: LeeAnn Black
- Head of School: Suzanne Fogarty
- Grades: K–12
- Gender: Girls
- Enrollment: 810
- Student to teacher ratio: 6:1
- Campus: Urban
- Colors: Green and gold
- Athletics conference: NYSAISAA
- Nickname: Gators
- Tuition: $68,250 (2025-26)
- Affiliations: New York Interschool
- Website: www.chapin.edu

Chapin School is an all-girls independent day school in Manhattan's Upper East Side neighborhood in New York City.

== History ==
Maria Bowen Chapin opened "Miss Chapin's School for Girls and Kindergarten for Boys and Girls" in 1901. The school originally enrolled 78 students, who were taught by seven teachers. It developed from a small elementary school Chapin and Alice Wetmore founded in 1894 that was explicitly intended to prepare young girls for success at the Brearley School, which had been created 10 years earlier. Chapin ran the educational side of "Primary Classes for Girls" and Wetmore ran the business end. The two ended their partnership in 1901, and Miss Chapin's School was born.

Chapin's first high school diplomas were granted in 1908, and the last boys attended in 1917.

Chapin remained headmistress until 1932. At her request, the school was renamed the Chapin School after she died, in 1934.

Chapin is at 100 East End Avenue, at East 84th Street. Chapin's school was originally at 12 West 47th Street. In 1905 the school moved to East 58th Street. In 1910 it moved to East 57th Street. The school has been at its current location on the Upper East Side since 1928.

== Heads of School ==
- 1901–1932: Maria Bowen Chapin
- 1932–1935: Mary Cecelia Fairfax^{§}
- 1932–1959: Ethel Grey Stringfellow^{§}
- 1959–1993: Mildred Jeanmaire Berendsen
- 1993–2003: Sandra Theunick
- 2003–2020: Patricia T. Hayot
- 2020–present: Suzanne Fogarty

^{§} joint headmistresses, 1932–1935

== Academics, activities, and athletics ==
Chapin's 802 students are split into three divisions: Lower School (kindergarten through grade 3), Middle School (grades 4 through 7), and Upper School (grades 8 through 12).

Around sixty students start in kindergarten, where they are divided into three classes. Each K class has two teachers, with regular use of teaching specialists (e.g., reading, Spanish, art, music, science, technology, gym, etc.)

There are about 265 students in the Upper School (8th through 12th grades), where they are taught by 53 faculty members. Traditionally, Chapin did not make an effort to replace students who left the school (generally for boarding and coed schools), leading to graduating classes of around 40. Currently, class sizes have changed, with most grades containing 65–70 students. A few students are added every year or two, often to compensate for students leaving, and 6–10 are added in 6th grade. A larger number of students are added in 9th grade, increasing the overall upper division class size.

While the lower school program combines progressive and traditional characteristics, the upper school curriculum is considered to be a traditionally rigorous liberal arts program. There are multiple requirements, including at least one modern language and two years of Latin. The Latin requirement is fulfilled in the 7th and 8th grade, and not required for those joining the school past that. The languages offered in addition to Latin are Spanish, French, and Mandarin. While Chapin used to offer AP classes, they were phased out in recent years, and the school focuses on advanced courses of their own design. Electives are called FOCUS courses, and are offered to students starting in 10th grade.

Many students do independent studies or study abroad programs, particularly through Chapin's exchange programs with the St. Hilda's Anglican School for Girls (Perth, Australia) and the American Community Schools (Athens, Greece). Since 2011, Chapin has worked with the Kibera School for Girls in Nairobi, Kenya, developing curriculum ideas and visiting each other's campuses. Chapin is also a charter affiliate member of the Online School for Girls (OSG), in which students can take courses offered to more than 30 girls' schools across the country. New York Interschool courses are offered in advanced math, leadership, and ethics. Mentorship derives from multiple sources, including faculty advisors and peer leaders.

The student-to-teacher ratio is 6 to 1. Twenty-one percent of the students receive tuition assistance, amounting to over $5 million per year.

There are 18 athletic teams at Chapin, including 15 varsity sports. Named the Gators, the teams compete in the New York Athletic Association for Independent Schools (NY AAIS), which is a league composed of the Brearley School, Chapin, Friends Seminary, Hewitt School, Marymount School, Nightingale Bamford School, Packer Collegiate Institute, Convent of the Sacred Heart, Saint Ann's School, Horace Mann School, Trinity School, Riverdale Country School, Staten Island Academy, and Spence School. Chapin varsity sports include badminton, basketball, cross country, fencing, field hockey, golf, gymnastics, indoor track, lacrosse, soccer, squash, swimming, tennis, track and volleyball.

== Traditions ==
The Chapin School

The school's motto is Fortiter et Recte (Bravely and Rightly).

The wheel on the school's seal was chosen by the school's founder because it is the symbol for Saint Catherine of Alexandria, the patron saint of philosophers, thinkers, and educated women. The students leave assembly in a wheel pattern.

Chapin has had a tradition of green/gold competitions since at least 1912. Throughout the year, but especially on the annual Field Day, these green and gold teams fiercely compete until a winner is announced at the end of each school year. Students join their team in 4th grade—when applicable, joining the team of their mother or grandmother—and remain on the same team throughout their time at Chapin.

Commencement ceremonies have remained unchanged for a century. Students wear white dresses and stand together with no differentiation made. No academic awards are given, and there has never been a Chapin valedictorian.

Chapin has long stood in athletic rivalry to the neighboring Brearley School, with which it shares some classes, after-school programs, homecoming, and a robotics team.

== Facilities ==
All Chapin programs exist under one roof.

=== Annenberg Library ===
The building features the two-story Annenberg Library with over 45,000 volumes and rooms for multimedia and video editing. The library also contains a 3D printing and vinyl cutting room, three student study rooms, a student conference room, multiple lounge and table areas amongst the bookshelves, and a multi-media room. There is a separate lower-school library.

=== Classrooms and gyms ===
As of 2025, Chapin featured 56 classrooms, eight science laboratories, four art studios including a photography darkroom and a ceramics studio, two music studios, a black box theater, a dance studio, two computer laboratories, four gymnasiums and a greenhouse.

=== Additional facilities ===
In 2008, construction at Chapin provided new facilities for art, language, science and the greenhouse via expansion of the fifth and sixth floors and addition of the seventh and eighth floors.

A further round of construction began in May 2015. The new Lower Level Dining Room, a dining space for classes K–5 and multipurpose room, was completed in 2016. With the project completed, Chapin now has eleven stories and a top-floor regulation-size gymnasium to complement its four previous gyms, a rooftop turf practice field and fitness center, expanded performing arts facilities, much larger dining facilities, and additional classrooms to provide more flexibility and experiential learning. Chapin's construction project drew opposition from neighbors, who have objected to its scale, its length, and the noise level, among other issues.

== College placement and rankings ==
Chapin is typically ranked among the top private schools in the United States.
