= Soundview Preparatory School =

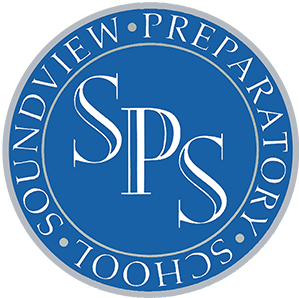

Location
- 370 Underhill Avenue; Yorktown Heights, New York 10598; United States; 41°16′8.2″N 73°47′6.5″W

Information
- School type: Tuition, Donations, Private
- Established: 1989
- Closed: 2020
- Oversight: Board of Directors
- Head of School: Tom Curley
- Grades: 6-12
- Enrollment: ~47
- Average class size: 5-10 Students per class
- Student to teacher ratio: 5:1
- Hours in school day: 7
- Classrooms: about 20
- Campus: Woodlands
- Campus size: 13 acres (53,000 m^{2})
- Colours: Blue and White
- Slogan: Soundview Preparatory School (1989-2020)
- Athletics: Yes
- Sports: Soccer, Basketball, Bowling, and Ultimate Frisbee
- Mascot: Bulldog
- Nickname: Soundview, Soundview Prep
- Team name: Soundview Bulldogs
- Rivals: New York School for the Deaf, Thornton-Donovan School, The Harvey School, Rockland Country Day School
- Accreditation: New York State Association of Independent Schools
- Yearbook: Yes
- Affiliation: None
- Website: www.soundviewprep.org

Soundview Preparatory School was an independent, co-ed day school for grades 6 – 12 that was located on a 13-acre campus in Yorktown Heights, New York in northern Westchester County. Founded in the spring of 1989 by William Glyn Hearn, the School had an enrollment of approximately 60 students at the time of its closure. Students came from Westchester, Putnam and Rockland Counties in New York State and from Fairfield County in Connecticut, as well as from New York City.

Soundview Preparatory School closed its doors on February 3, 2020, for budgetary reasons.

== Extracurricular activities ==
This School had many clubs, each one hosted by a teacher, where students could meet others who shared an immediate interest. Some clubs offered in the past were the Knitting Club, the Politics Club, the Franchise Club, the Chess Club, the Drama Club, the Community Service Club, and the Yearbook Club. Usually, the clubs met once a week.

Soundview's athletes were the Soundview Bulldogs, and sports played throughout the year included soccer, basketball, bowling and Ultimate Frisbee. To foster a sense of community and school spirit, all students were encouraged to attend at least some games. In past years, the school had an annual trip to foreign countries, and students had been able to visit England, Italy, Greece, China, Russia, Spain, and Argentina.
