= Jenny Mollica =

British arts administrator

- Born: September 1981 (age 44)
- Citizenship: British
- Education: University of St Andrews (MA); Middlesex University (MA); Russian Institute of Theatre Arts (MA); University of Greenwich (PGCE)
- Occupation: Arts administrator
- Employer: Roundhouse
- Known for: Chief Executive Officer of Roundhouse, Chief Executive Officer of English National Opera
- Title: Chief Executive Officer

Jenny Mollica (born 1981) is a British arts administrator. She is currently Chief Executive Officer of the Roundhouse in Camden. and the former CEO of English National Opera (ENO).

Mollica was listed in The Stage's 100 most influential leaders in UK opera and dance in 2024, 2025 and 2026.

== Education ==
Mollica holds an MA (Hons) from the University of St Andrews. She trained at postgraduate level as both an artist and educator, obtaining a Masters with Distinction in Theatre Directing from Middlesex University and the Russian Institute of Theatre Arts (GITIS), and a PGCE from the University of Greenwich.

== Career ==
=== Barbican and Guildhall School ===
Mollica worked at the Barbican Centre and Guildhall School of Music and Drama for over a decade in various roles, including as Director of Creative Learning. In this position, she led the strategic development of participatory cross-arts programmes, festivals and events across music, theatre, dance, visual arts, film and literature, supporting more than 22,000 participants annually. Notable achievements included launching the London training centre for the National Open Youth Orchestra and developing the Barbican Box schools programme. Her work with The Garden School, a school for learners with autism, received a National Creative Learning Achievement Award.

=== English National Opera ===
Mollica joined ENO in 2020 as Director of Strategy and Engagement, initially leading the organisation's strategy, policy and partnerships, as well as the learning and participation programme ENO Engage. She was appointed interim chief executive in August 2023, and confirmed as Chief Executive in May 2024 following an international search.

During her tenure, Mollica oversaw a period of significant transformation as ENO established a partnership with Greater Manchester following Arts Council England's controversial decision to require the company to relocate its main base from London by 2029. She secured key artistic appointments including Music Director Designate André de Ridder and worked to develop ENO's Manchester partnerships, stating that Greater Manchester offered "a region of limitless creative possibilities".

Under Mollica's leadership, ENO Engage expanded nationally, reaching over 100,000 people annually through creative learning and wellbeing programmes. The creative health programme ENO Breathe, developed in partnership with the NHS to support people recovering from long COVID, received the Royal Philharmonic Society (RPS) Impact Award in 2021. By 2024, the programme had become available through more than 90 NHS partners nationally. She also led digital initiatives including co-executive producing a television and broadcast project for Sky Arts and Sky Kids designed to introduce opera to family audiences.

In November 2025, ENO announced that Mollica is to stand down as its chief executive officer in the summer of 2026.

=== Roundhouse ===
In November 2025, the Roundhouse announced the appointment of Mollica as its next chief executive, in succession to Marcus Davey, who led the venue for 27 years. Mollica began her tenure as Chief Executive in June 2026.

== Board memberships ==
Mollica serves as chair of the board of Clod Ensemble.. She is a Trustee of the Philip Loubser Foundation and a Council Member of the Lord-Lieutenant of Greater London's Council on Culture and Heritage. She has previously been a board member of the National Opera Studio
