= Winston Preparatory School =

Independent private school for children who learn differently, in the United States

Winston Preparatory School

Location
- Dix Hills, New York; New York, New York; Marin, California; Norwalk, Connecticut; Whippany, New Jersey; United States; 40°44′23″N 73°59′49″W

Information
- Type: Independent private school
- Motto: Education for the individual
- Religious affiliation: Nonsectarian
- Established: 1981
- NCES School ID: AA001646
- Executive Director: Scott Bezsylko
- Faculty: 250
- Teaching staff: 250 (on an FTE basis)
- Grades: 5-12
- Gender: Co-educational
- Enrollment: 575
- Student to teacher ratio: 3.0
- Color: Blue/White
- Mascot: Winston the Bulldog
- Website: http://www.winstonprep.edu/

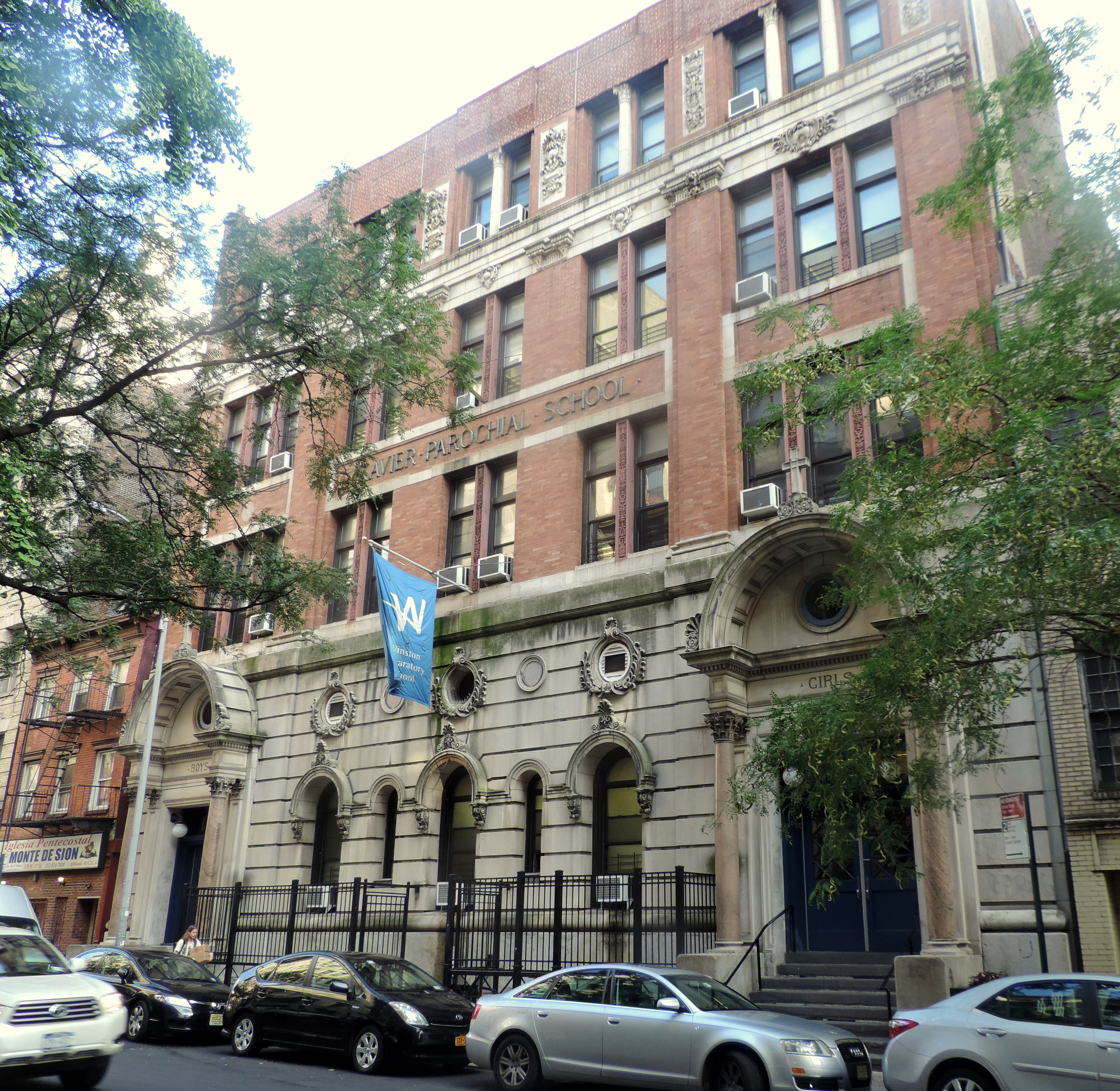
17th Street

Winston Preparatory School is an independent private school for students with learning differences (such as dyslexia, ADHD, and NVLD) in grades 4-12. The school has campuses in New York City; Suffolk County, New York; Norwalk, Connecticut; Whippany, New Jersey; and Marin, California.

Winston Preparatory School is chartered by the State of New York and is a member of ISAAGNY, NYSAIS, NEASC, and NAIS.

== See also ==
- Education in Norwalk, Connecticut
