= Dwight School =

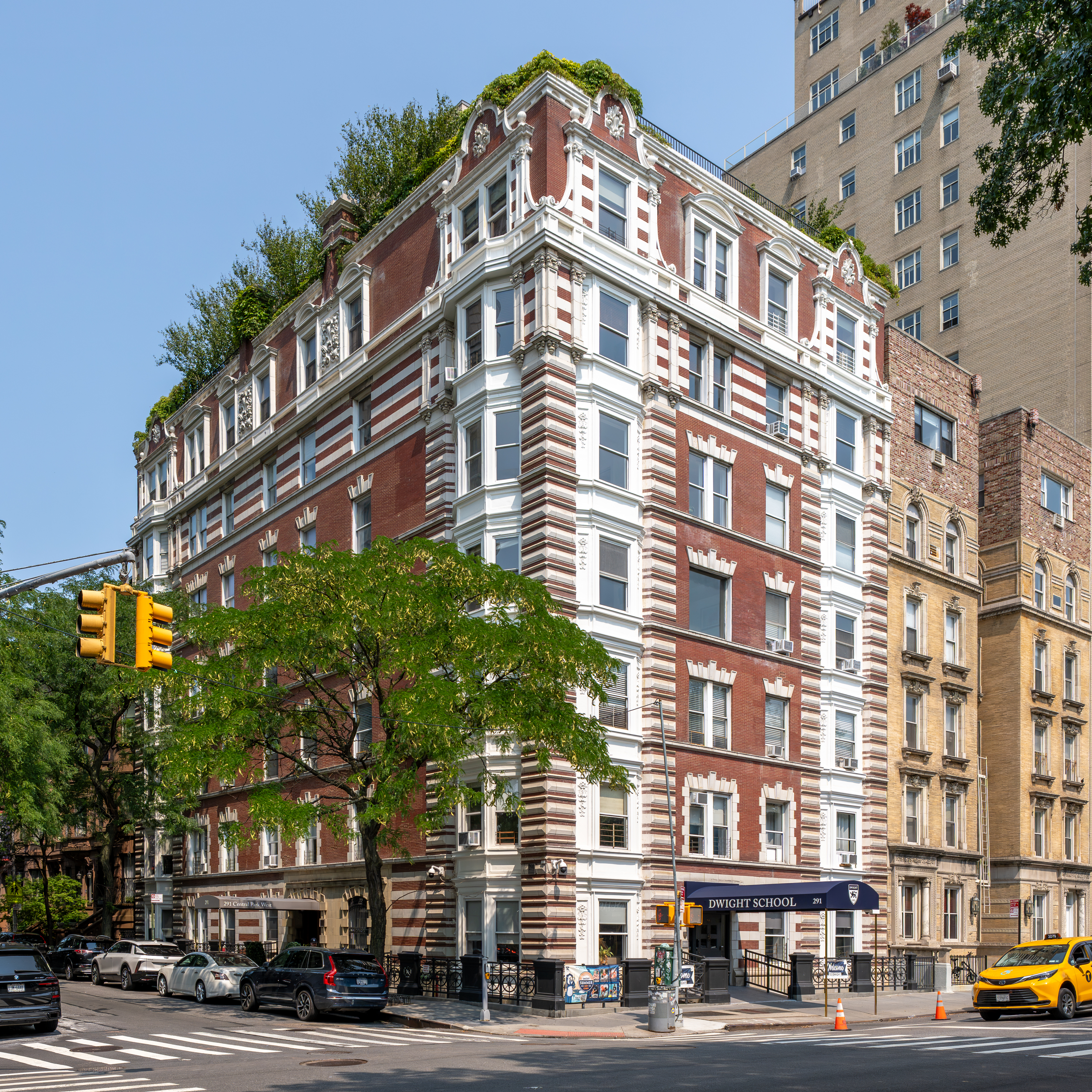

Location
- 291 Central Park West, Manhattan; New York City, New York 10024; United States; 40°47′15″N 73°58′05″W

Information
- Type: Private; Independent; day; college-preparatory school
- Motto: Igniting the spark of genius in every child
- Religious affiliation: Nonsectarian
- Established: 1872; 154 years ago
- Founder: Julius Sachs
- Head of School: Dianne Drew
- Teaching staff: 175.9 (FTE)
- Grades: Preschool – 12
- Gender: Co-Ed
- Enrollment: 574 (2013–14)
- Student to teacher ratio: 3.3
- Campus: Urban
- Colors: Blue and White
- Athletics conference: New York State Association of Independent Schools; Independent Schools Athletic League
- Mascot: Lion
- Nickname: Lions
- Tuition: $67,900
- Website: http://www.dwight.edu/

Dwight School is a private independent for-profit college preparatory school located on the Upper West Side of Manhattan, New York City. The Dwight School offers the International Baccalaureate curriculum to students ages two through grade twelve.

== History ==
Founded in 1872 by Julius Sachs as part of the Sachs Collegiate Institute, Dwight School was first known as "The Sachs School," then The Franklin School. Originally located on West 34th Street and Broadway, it relocated several times as it grew, ultimately moving to 18 West 89th Street in 1912. Sachs, a noted educator and author (and scion of the Goldman–Sachs family) headed the school until at least 1901 when he was appointed Professor of Education at Teachers College, Columbia University.

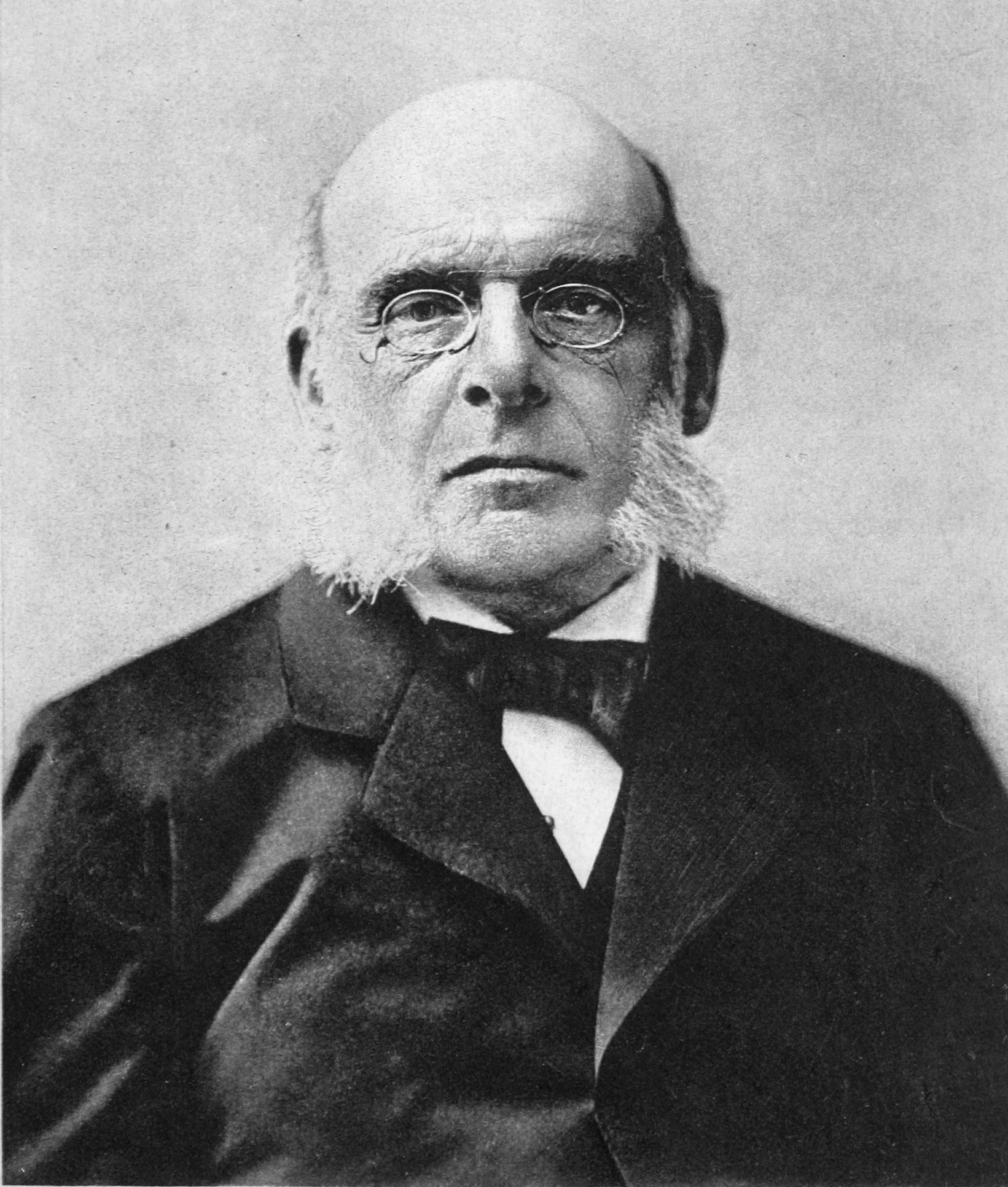
Timothy Dwight V, in honor of whom the school was named.

In 1880, the New York School of Languages was founded on 15 West 43rd Street as an academy of classical studies. Timothy Dwight, President of Yale University asked the school to pioneer a math and science program to replace traditional Greek and Latin as an entrance requirement. The New York School of Languages was later renamed Timothy Dwight School in honor of that historic partnership.

In the late 1960s Moe C. Spahn and his wife bought the school for their son Stephen to run; after serving as assistant headmaster Stephen became headmaster on June 1, 1967. Stephen's father Moe was the headmaster of the Franklin School which would later merge with Dwight. Owner Stephen Spahn's sister and her husband own New York City's York Preparatory School.

Dwight School merged with the Bentley School in 1977, in order to add elementary and middle school programs to its curriculum.

In 1993, Dwight School merged with the Franklin School (which had adopted the International Baccalaureate (IB) Program in 1980) and moved from 402 East 67th Street to its present location at 291 Central Park West. In 1996, Dwight School became the first school in North America to offer the full International Baccalaureate (IB) program from preschool through grade 12.

Today, one-third of Dwight's students come from overseas. Under Spahn's leadership, Dwight also expanded internationally, establishing a network of affiliated schools in Europe, Asia, and the Middle East as part of the Dwight Schools Global Network.

== Institution ==
=== Chancellor ===
Stephen H. Spahn has served as the school's owner and chancellor since 1967. Spahn also serves on the boards of the International Baccalaureate Fund and the Rubin Museum of Art, and was a founding member of the Guild of International Baccalaureate Schools. In 2011, he received the Lewis Hine Distinguished Service Award from the National Child Labor Committee.

Blake Spahn, a Dwight alumnus, serves as vice chancellor of the Dwight Schools network and is involved in the management and development of the school's global campuses.

=== Admissions ===
Admission to Dwight School is selective. Kindergarten, sixth grade, and ninth grade are Dwight's largest entry points, with 40 students entering kindergarten, 15 entering sixth grade and 25 entering ninth grade. Each year, a smaller number of students are accepted in other grades. Dwight offers rolling admissions for international families due to the wide range of academic calendars around the world.

The admissions process at Dwight School is based on school reports, teacher recommendations, ERB/ISEE test results, and student/parent interviews.

=== Dwight Schools Global Network ===
The Dwight Schools Global Network is a group of affiliated international campuses connected with Dwight School in New York City. These include Dwight Global Online School, Dwight School London in the United Kingdom, Shanghai Qibao Dwight High School in China, Dwight School Seoul in South Korea, Dwight School Dubai in the United Arab Emirates, and Dwight School Hanoi in Vietnam.

Dwight School's association with Dwight School London goes back over 40 years when Stephen Spahn, Chancellor of Dwight School New York opened the school. In 2008, what was known as Woodside Park International School was renamed as The North London International School (NLIS) and later renamed Dwight School London in 2012. In 2010, Dwight London opened a partner school in London called The Holmewood School (THSL) which aims to provide special education for children of high cognitive ability with difficulties associated with autism. In 2009, Dwight entered into the first joint diploma program in China with the Capital Normal High School, attached to Capital Normal University, in Beijing. Through this program, each student receives a joint Capital Normal/Dwight School diploma with strong emphasis on English as a Second Language.

In 2010, Dwight was chosen from 180 foreign schools by the government of Seoul, Korea, to open Dwight School Seoul as a model IB School for five hundred forty students in grades K-12. Opened in fall 2012, the school is housed within a new multimillion-dollar media and culture complex, Seoul's Digital Media City.

== Notable alumni ==
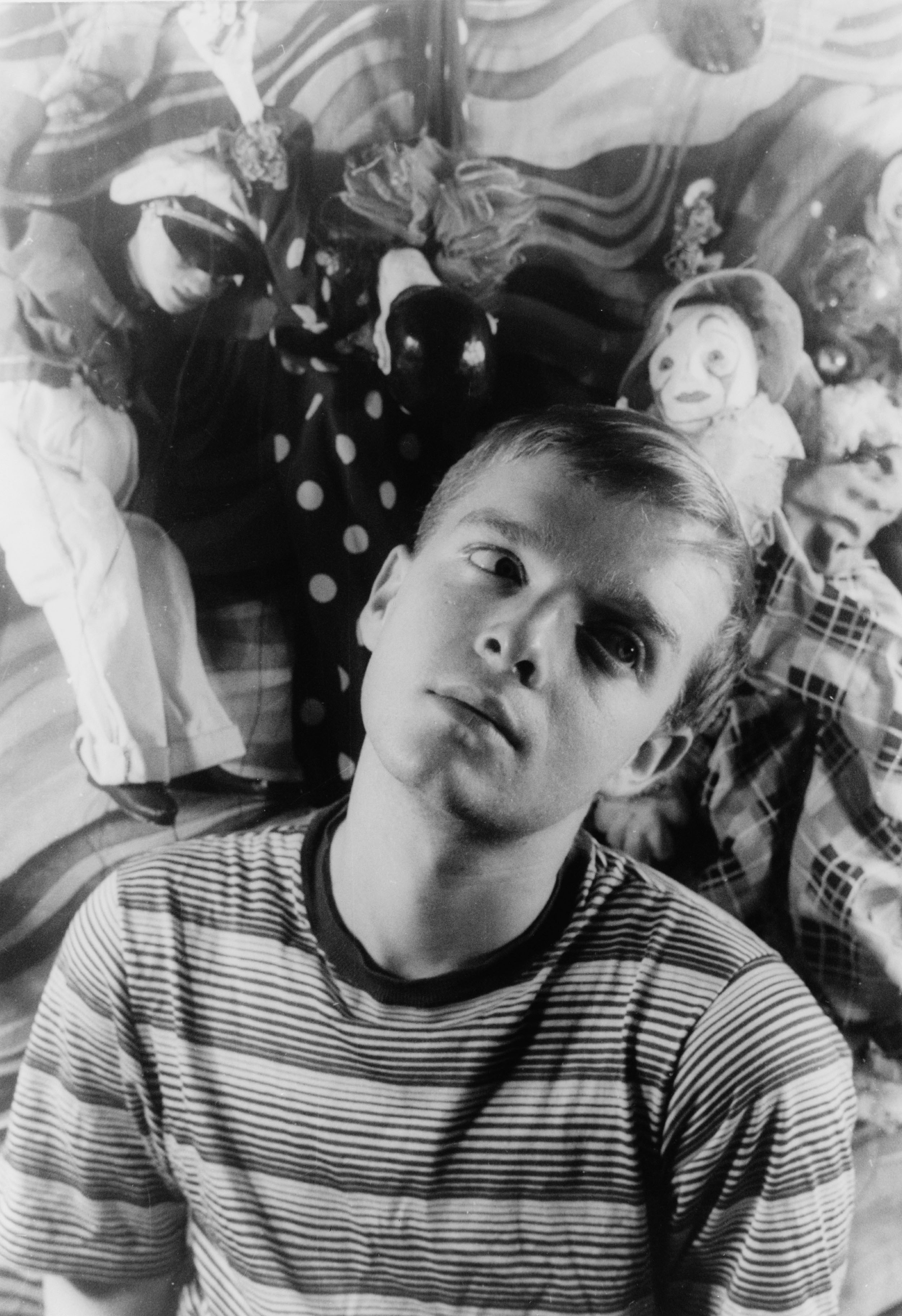
Truman Capote

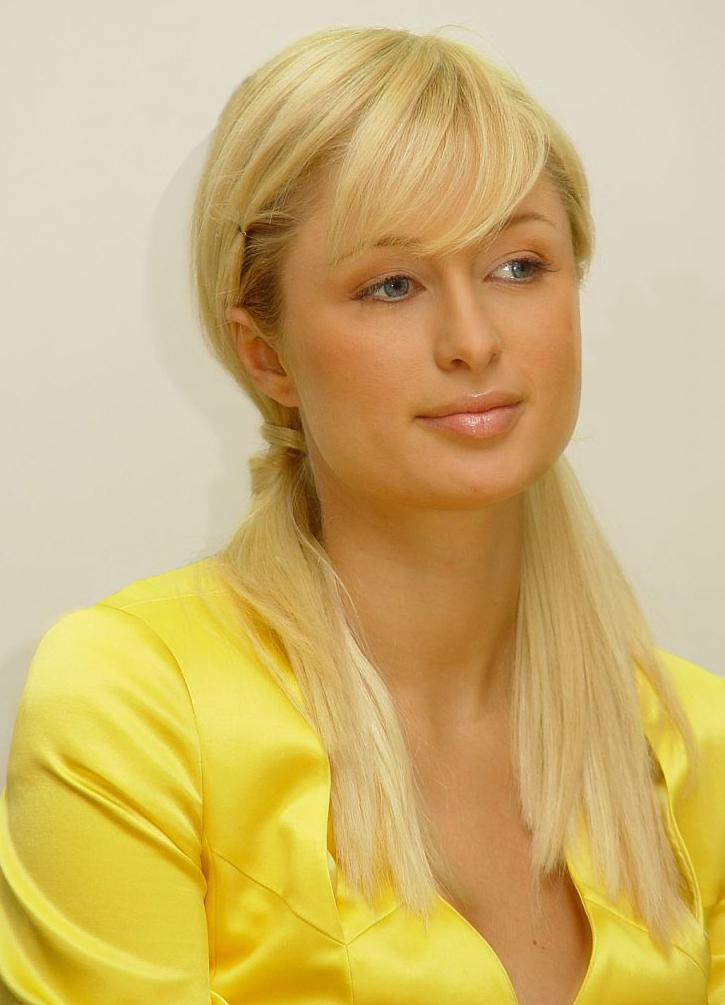
Paris Hilton

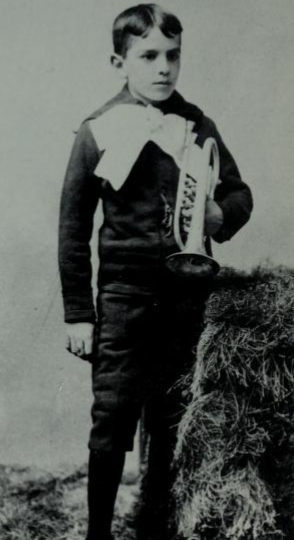
Fiorello La Guardia

- Dana Barron, actress
- Richard K. Bernstein, physician and an advocate for a low-carbohydrate diabetes diet
- Antonio Campos, film director, screenwriter and film producer
- Truman Capote (1924–1984), author
- Julian Casablancas, musician, The Strokes
- Addison O'Dea, documentary filmmaker
- Joseph Cullman, tobacco magnate
- Damon Dash, entrepreneur, music producer and actor
- Doug Davis (born 1972), entertainment lawyer and Grammy and Emmy Award-winning record producer
- Prince Achileas-Andreas of Greece and Denmark, socialite, actor, member of non-reigning Greek royal family and extended Danish royal family
- Harry L. Fisher (1885–1961), noted chemist
- Julius J. Gans, lawyer, politician, and judge
- Jonah Goldberg, syndicated columnist, Los Angeles Times
- Lizzie Grubman, publicist, manager and socialite
- Paris Hilton (born 1981), socialite, heiress, entrepreneur
- Race Imboden, Olympic fencer
- Kamara James (1984–2014), Olympic fencer
- Casey Johnson, socialite
- Lincoln Jones (1933–2013), US Army major general
- Robert Kalloch, Hollywood costume designer
- Fiorello H. La Guardia (1882–1947), Mayor of New York
- Serge Kovaleski, Pulitzer Prize-winning reporter, The New York Times
- Sam Lansky, journalist for Time and other publications
- Herbert Henry Lehman, governor of New York state
- Roy Lichtenstein (1923–1997), artist
- Walter Lippmann, author
- Curtis McDowald (born 1996), fencer
- Gerald Mohr (1914–1968), American radio, film, and television character actor and frequent leading man
- Fabrizio Moretti, musician, The Strokes
- Henry Morgenthau Jr. (1891–1967), US Secretary of the Treasury
- Robert Moses (1888–1981), noted city planner
- Josh Ostrovsky (born 1982), "The Fat Jewish", entrepreneur, social media personality, and plus size model
- Harold Prince (1928–2019), theatre director and producer
- Keith Raywood, designer
- Paul J. Sachs (1878–1965), businessman and museum director
- Aarón Sánchez (born 1976), chef and Food Network personality
- Alix Smith, photographer
- Irwin Steingut (1893–1952), lawyer, businessman, and politician
- Paul Strauss (born 1964), politician, attorney, senior United States shadow senator from the District of Columbia
- Iphigene Ochs Sulzberger (1892–1990), heiress, socialite, newspaper executive, philanthropist, and owner of The New York Times
- Elinor Tatum, publisher and Editor in Chief of the New York Amsterdam News
- Scott A. Travers, author and numismatist
- Vanessa Trump (born 1977), actress, ex-wife of Donald Trump Jr.
- Nick Valensi, musician, The Strokes
- Hans Zinsser, immunologist
