= Joseph Rallo =

American university administrator

Joseph Rallo is the State of Louisiana's Commissioner of Higher Education. Previously he served as vice chancellor of the Texas Tech University System and as the 5th president of Angelo State University. He assumed his current position in 2015.

== Education ==
After graduating from Staten Island Academy in 1967, Rallo earned his bachelor's degree in Russian history from Lafayette College, Masters and Doctorate degrees from the Maxwell School at Syracuse University, and law degree from Western New England College. His academic specialties are in Russian history‚ global business policy and law. While at Lafayette he joined Delta Tau Delta International Fraternity.

== Career ==
Joseph Rallo has taught at Rutgers and University of Southern Colorado and was Director of the West European Program and associate professor of International Relations at the United States Air Force Academy and served as Director of International Programs and associate professor of International business at Michigan Technological University. Since his entrance to College Administration he has served as the Dean of Business at Ferris State University, Dean of the college and Graduate School of Business Administration at the University of Colorado at Colorado Springs, Director of the Colorado Institute for Technology Transfer and Implementation and Provost and Academic Vice President at Western Illinois University.

He has also served as a Fulbright Scholar and a NATO fellow. He has testified before Congressional committees on Science, Space and Technology and peer-reviewed business grants for the U.S. Department of Education Business and International Education Program and the U.S. Department of Education Undergraduate International Studies and Foreign Language Program as an expert on International Business topics, the European Union and Aerospace. In addition to his academic career he has served in the United States Air Force in both the active duty and the reserves. He retired in 2008 at the rank of colonel.
