= Harry L. Fisher =

American scientist

Harry Linn Fisher (19 January 1885 – 19 March 1961) was the 69th national president of the American Chemical Society, and an authority on the chemistry of vulcanization. Fisher was the author of four popular books on the chemistry and technology of rubber, and the holder of 50 patents.

== Personal ==
Fisher was born on Jan. 19, 1885, in Kingston, New York. His father was the engineer, who in 1883, took the first locomotive from Kingston, N. Y., to Weehawken, New Jersey, along the tracks of the old New York, West Shore and Buffalo Railroad. In 1910, he married Nellie Edna Andrews. They had a son and two daughters. Fisher was said to enjoy "color photography, singing and mountain climbing". Fisher died on 19 March 1961.

== Education ==
After finishing High School, Fisher worked for three years before taking a year of refresher coursework at Dwight School in New York City. He went on to study at Williams College in Williamstown, Mass. He majored in classics, but switched to chemistry in his junior year, obtaining his AB degree in 1909. Fisher then attended Columbia University on scholarship, earning his PhD degree in 1912 under Marston Taylor Bogert. His PhD dissertation focused on the preparation and properties of 5-aminoquinoline-6-carboxylic acid and related compounds.

== Career ==
- 1912-1919 Instructor in Organic Chemistry at Columbia University
- 1919-1926 B. F. Goodrich, Akron, Ohio
- 1926-1936 Research Chemist at U. S. Rubber Company, New York and New Jersey
- 1936-1950 Director of Organic Research at U. S. Industrial Chemicals
- 1950 retired
- 1951-1952 Administrative Assistant for the National Research Council, special assistant to the director of the Office of Synthetic Rubber
- 1953 - Head, Department of Rubber Technology, University of Southern California

== Recognitions ==
- Columbia University's Chandler Medal for his outstanding contributions to the chemistry of synthetic rubber
- 1949 Charles Goodyear Medal for outstanding achievement in the field of rubber chemistry
