= Rory Staunton =

Young sepsis victim from Queens, New York (1999–2012)

- Born: May 13, 1999; Queens, New York
- Died: April 1, 2012 (aged 12); New York City, New York
- Parent(s): Ciaran Staunton, Orlaith Staunton
- Relatives: Kathleen Staunton (sister)

Rory Staunton (13 May 1999 – 1 April 2012) was a young boy from Queens, New York, whose death from sepsis created a nationwide movement to address the issue of early recognition of sepsis and its treatment.

Both Jim Dwyer, columnist from The New York Times, and Op Ed columnist Maureen Dowd wrote about Staunton's death and the medical errors that preceded it. His father and mother, Ciaran Staunton and Orlaith Staunton, appeared on NBC's Today and the Dr. Oz Show discussing his death, which they stated was due to hospital errors. An investigation by the New York State Department of Health into the death of Rory Staunton revealed that his treatment at NYU Langone Emergency Room in New York City did not meet the basic standards of care.

== Death ==
Staunton received a scrape on his arm during a basketball game at school. He was not sent to the school nurse to address his wounds. After falling ill the following day, his parents brought him to his pediatrician, who sent him to NYU Langone emergency room in New York for re-hydration. At NYU Langone, hospital staff missed several symptoms indicating he could be developing sepsis. He was sent home where his condition worsened, and he became seriously ill before returning to the hospital the next evening. By then it was too late and he died of sepsis at NYU Langone on April 1, 2012. He is buried next to his grandmother in Drogheda, Ireland.

== Legacy ==
Staunton's parents and sister immediately embarked on a nationwide campaign to alert parents of young children to sepsis possibility when a child is injured. Their work resulted in the passage of "Rory's Regulations" in New York State by Governor Cuomo in January 2013. These regulations require all hospitals to adopt best practices for the early identification and treatment of sepsis. The regulations also require special procedures for pediatric patients including communication of critical test results and the posting of a "Parents Bill of Rights". The Staunton family also established the Rory Staunton Foundation to support education and outreach efforts aimed at rapid diagnosis and treatment of sepsis, particularly in children. Several letters received by the Foundation have credited reading about Staunton's experience with saving their own children's lives after they developed similar symptoms.

Staunton was captain of his debating team and led a fight to end the use of the word "retard" in his school. His "Spread the Word to End the Word" campaign won him praise from the Special Olympics. In honor of his work, Staunton's mother's home town of Drogheda in Ireland held the first Annual Rory Staunton Award for filmmakers with special needs.

On September 23, 2013, the Rory Staunton Field was officially declared open by Congressman Joe Crowley in Queens, beside where Staunton attended the Garden School. He and his family were instrumental in saving the park from turning into a high-rise building.

At a Senate HELP Committee's hearing on September 24, 2013 – U.S. Efforts to Reduce Healthcare-Associated Infections (HAI's) – Rory Staunton's case was highlighted and testimony was heard from his dad. Senator Tom Harkin highlighted the criticality of the issue, stating: "...we need Rory's Regulations in every state so that they can recognize sepsis." On September 17, 2014, The Rory Staunton Foundation held the first ever Sepsis Forum in Washington D.C. attended by Senator Charles Schumer (D-NY); Thomas Frieden M.D., Director CDC; Patrick Conway, M.D., CMS Chief Medical Officer; Congressman Joseph Crowley; and Kevin Tracey M.D. Director, Feinstein Institute. In November 2014, the Staunton family met with U.S. Health Secretary, Sylvia Mathews Burwell and addressed the opening session of the CMS Health Conference in Baltimore, Maryland.
