= Ice-T's Rap School =

- Starring: Ice-T; York Prep Crew
- Country of origin: United States
- No. of episodes: 6

Production
- Running time: 30 minutes

Original release
- Network: VH1
- Release: October 20 – November 17, 2006

Ice-T's Rap School is a reality television show on VH1. It is a spin-off of the British reality show Gene Simmons' Rock School, which also aired on VH1.

In Rap School, rapper/actor Ice-T teaches eight teens from York Preparatory School in New York City how to become a real hip-hop group called the "York Prep Crew" ("Y.P. Crew" for short). Each week, Ice-T gives them assignments and they compete for an imitation gold chain with a microphone on it. On the season finale, the group performed as an opening act for Public Enemy.

== Cast and characters ==
(nicknames were given by Ice-T himself)

Real Name	Nickname	Job	Notes
Tracy Morrow	Ice-T	Teacher	Ice-T is a skilled veteran of the rap game. He also gets some of his friends to help him teach rap school sometimes or just to judge or encourage them.
Dodge Landesman	Dodge City	promoter/Rapper	"Dodge City" is the old fashioned student who loves 1940s' and 1950s' music. He is always dressing in a suit or another old fashioned way. He claims to have not worn jeans for 6 years.
Sam	Money Man Sam	Rapper	"Money Man Sam" is a prep student who works the hardest on his raps. He is also one of the best at rapping according to Ice-T.
Sophia	So Fine	Manager/Rapper	"So Fine" is the popular prep student who loves to speak her mind. She is best friends with "Lady A" and "E-Rizzle".
Leir	Big L	Hype man	"Big L" is a student who loves to play and joke around but is one of the best at rapping according to Ice-T. He once considered quitting the group but then decided to come back.
Mary	Missy M	Rapper	"Missy M" is a shy student who likes rapping about life. She is upset sometimes about her parents' divorce, and causes her to have low condfidence.
Arielle	Lady A	Dancer/Rapper	"Lady A" is also a popular student and is best friends with "So Fine" and E-Rizzle".
Erin	E-Rizzle	Dancer	"E-Rizzle" is also a popular student who's best friends with "Lady A" and "So Fine".
Phil	Phil the Agony	DJ	"Phil the Agony" has trouble rapping because he stutters. Ice-T thinks he should be a DJ, because that is where he showed the most talent.

== Episodes ==
No.	Title	Original release date	Prod. code
1	"Episode 1"	October 20, 2006	101
Ice-T arrives at the prep school. He meets the students. He teaches them how to dress with hip hop fashion. First, Ice has them try freestyle rapping to get an idea of their skill levels. Next, he gives them an assignment to write a rap to get a taste of their rapping style and to decide their nicknames. Then, he takes them on a field trip to the birthplace of hip-hop, the South Bronx. They meet Grandmaster Melle Mel and Grandmaster Caz and perform for them. Some of the students decide to DJ also for extra credit. Dodge gets the gold mic for his good rapping skill and for trying his hardest at DJing.
2	"Episode 2"	October 20, 2006	102
The students get quick dance lessons from professional dancers. Missy has a breakdown because she thinks she is the worse dancer. Big L encourages her to dance and she finds out she wasn't so bad after all. Later, Ice assigns the students to create their own rap. Big L gets the gold mic for the best rap. However, Sam is upset because he feels he wrote the best rhymes. He confronts Ice and to settle it, Ice decides to have Big L and Sam do freestyle rap battle. Ice wants to make it seem fair so he doesn't judge. He allows Dodge City and Phil the Agony to judge. They both think the best freestyler was Money Man Sam, so he gets the gold mic.
3	"Episode 3"	October 27, 2006	103
Ice-T and his friends, MC Lyte and DJ Premier, will pick the MC's, DJ, dancers and a hype man from the group by audition. Missy M starts her rap but then has another breakdown and cries. But then, E-Rizzle, So Fine, and Lady A encourage her to finish her rap. She finishes her rap successfully. Money Man Sam is quick with his rap. Big L made his rap funny and gets good laughs from the judges. Dodge City raps but messes up. Ice expected better from him. Phil the Agony stutters and also forgets his rap. He gives up and walks off stage with tears in his eyes. Lady A, E-Rizzle and So Fine also perform their raps. Then they DJ. Everyone is bad at it besides Phil the Agony. Dodge really wants to be a rapper, so he tries again by freestyling passionately. The judges are impressed, so Dodge is a made a rapper. Money Man Sam and So Fine are also made rappers. Big L is the hype man. E-Rizzle is the dancer. Lady is made a rapper as well as a dancer. Phil the Agony is the DJ. Sam retains his gold mic for his impressive performance.
4	"Episode 4"	November 3, 2006	104
The students find out they have to rap in front of the whole school. They promote it on their school TV show. Big L refuses to participate in the show which upsets everyone. Ice makes So Fine the group manager because she's helping everyone out. Big L says he would prefer spending time with his friends. Ice asks him if he wants to stay and Big L responds that he doesn't care. Ice says that if Big L doesn't care, then he should quit. Ice reassigns the spot of the hype man to Dodge. The students decide their group's name to be the "York Prep Crew" (also shortened as "YPC" and "YP Crew"). Later, everyone talks about how Big L walked out on them. They are upset but they continue without him. Dodge practices being the hype man and gets upset at So Fine for laughing at him. Meanwhile, Big L is at home thinking if he should go back to the group. He finally decides to go to Ice's office and tells him he wants to come back. He also apologizes and promises to have a positive attitude. Ice-T announces to the students that Big L is back in the group. But everyone is still upset at him. Ice lets the students express their feelings to Big L. Their main problem is his attitude. He apologizes to the group. They forgive him but he has to work hard to fit back in. Big L and Dodge City are both the hype men. Everyone is excited but slightly nervous the day of the concert. They start performing and everyone is great until So Fine's microphone goes out. But Ice quickly tells Lady A and So Fine to trade mics and she successfully finishes. The crowd goes wild. So Fine gets the gold mic this week for being more responsible. Then Ice announces that they will soon be an opening act for Public Enemy. Everyone is excited. Missy M is excited but still nervous that the crowd will boo her.
5	"Episode 5"	November 10, 2006	105
The teens are now a real group. They froze up on the Ed Lover radio show. Afterwards, the teens record their music in a recording studio and make their 1st single. And later, they freestyle rap with another real rap group. The York Prep Crew lost but was still skilled. After that, the Y.P Crew and Ice-T go to a concert to watch Common perform. They talk to Common backstage. The gold mic goes to Missy M.
6	"Episode 6"	November 17, 2006	106
This is the season finale. The Y.P. Crew perform. It begins with last rehearsals, at which the band argues, but Ice gives the Crew a talk and they pull back together. The band travel to BB King's in a Limo. As they get used to the Celebrity lifestyle, Big L is struck down with the flu and there are doubts over whether he is fit to perform. He fights through and after some great showmanship by Phil the Agony (scratching the decks with a shoe) the band burst on stage. Their signature tune Straigh Outta Prep School begins, then 2 other tunes and a flawless rap by Moneyman Sam. Dodge begins to freestyle, but one hater in the crowd demands the mic, saying Dodge 'doesn't deserve it'. The crowd joins in, booing the students. In the end Ice is forced on stage to calm the crowd, and quickly evacuate the prep students. In the dressing room afterwards, the band is greeted by friends and family. Grandmaster Melle Mel says how well they have done, stating 'Before this I wouldn't have trusted Ice with my own kids'. At the end, they all say an emotional farewell to Ice outside York Prep and give him a book of letters from each of them. In return, he gives the each the Gold Mic and one to their Principal as well. He speeds off in his Bentley and as he pulls away he shouts 'YPC 4 Life' to end the series.

== The Gold Mic ==
Episode #	Students	Who gets the gold mic	Notes
1	Dodge City, So Fine, Money Man Sam, Big L, Lady A, E-Rizzle, Missy M, and Phil the Agony	Dodge City	Dodge City gets the gold mic for his skills and trying his hardest to DJ and rapping the whole 6'n the Morning.
2	Dodge City, So Fine, Money Man Sam, Big L, Lady A, E-Rizzle, Missy M, and Phil the Agony	Money Man Sam	Money Man Sam is upset with Big L getting the gold mic. They freestyle battle and Money Man Sam wins the gold mic.
3	Dodge City, So Fine, Money Man Sam, Big L, Lady A, E-Rizzle, Missy M, and Phil the Agony	Money Man Sam	Wins gold mic for the 2nd time for good skills.
4	Dodge City, So Fine, Money Man Sam, Big L, Lady A, E-Rizzle, Missy M, and Phil the Agony	So Fine	Wins gold mic for being more responsible.
5	Dodge City, So Fine, Money Man Sam, Big L, Lady A, E-Rizzle, Missy M, and Phil the Agony	Missy M	Wins gold mic for her improvement and confidence
6	Dodge City, So Fine, Money Man Sam, Big L, Lady A, E-Rizzle, Missy M, and Phil the Agony	Dodge City, So Fine, Money Man Sam, Big L, Lady A, E-Rizzle, Missy M, and Phil the Agony	All of them win the gold mic as a final farewell from Ice-T

== Guest stars ==
Episode them guest starred in	Celebrity	What they did / Notes
Episode 1	Grandmaster Melle Mel; Grandmaster Caz	Both helps students DJ
Episode 2	Pro Dancers	Teach students hip hop dances
Episode 3	MC Lyte; DJ Premier	Both were Judges
Episode 4	-	-
Episode 5	Ed Lover; GMS-152 Gang; Common	Ed Lover hosts his radio show. GMS-152 Gang does freestyle raps with the York Prep Crew. Common raps and later inspires and gives advice to the group.
Episode 6	Public Enemy	They perform at BB King's after the YPC open for them and meet the band before and after the show to give them a pep talk
