= Hewitt School =

Private school in New York, New York, US

The Hewitt School

Location
- 3 East 76th Street (K-4); 45 East 75th Street (5-12); New York, New York 10021; United States; 40°46′25″N 73°57′48″W

Information
- School type: Private, college-prep, day, Independent
- Motto: By Faith and Courage
- Founded: 1920
- Founder: Caroline D. Hewitt
- CEEB code: 333815
- Head of school: Dr. Jennifer Zaccara
- Teaching staff: 69
- Grades: K–12
- Gender: Girls
- Enrollment: 475
- Average class size: 12
- Student to teacher ratio: 7:1
- Campus size: 4 buildings
- Campus type: Urban
- Colors: Blue and white
- Athletics: Varsity badminton, basketball, cross country, golf, soccer, softball, squash, tennis, track and field, volleyball Middle School: cross country, soccer, volleyball, basketball; squash; strength, conditioning, and running, badminton, outdoor track and field
- Mascot: Harriet the Hawk
- Team name: Hawks
- Accreditation: New York State Association of Independent Schools
- Yearbook: The Argosy
- Website: www.hewittschool.org

The Hewitt School is a private, independent K–12 girls' school on New York City's Upper East Side. Founded in 1920 by Caroline D. Hewitt, the school began as private kindergarten classes in a townhouse.

== History ==
In 1908, Caroline Danella Hewitt (1872 - 1961) came from Barford, Warwickshire, England, United Kingdom to the United States as a private tutor to the prominent Hoffman family of Tuxedo Park, New York.

In 1920, after more than a decade in that position, and at the suggestion of the Hoffman family, Hewitt began private classes for children in a townhouse on the Upper East Side, establishing a small kindergarten for boys and girls located at the Mannes Music School. At this time, her school was referred to as Miss Hewitt's Classes. Over time, the school expanded and began to educate exclusively girls.

In 1942, Hewitt retired and was succeeded by faculty member Charlotte Comfort. In 1950, Miss Hewitt's Classes was granted a charter as a nonprofit corporation. In 1951, the school moved to its current location at 45 East 75th Street.

In 1955, Miss Hewitt's Classes became The Hewitt School.

=== Campus ===
The Hewitt School is housed in four connected buildings on the Upper East Side of Manhattan.

The campus has evolved significantly since its founding. Initially housed in a brownstone at 68 East 79th Street to accommodate growing enrollment, the school moved in 1951 to its current location at 45 East 75th Street. Through the late 20th century, the campus expanded with the addition of the Gregory Building in 1968 and a vertical expansion in 1976. Renovations in the 1980s modernized classrooms and added performing arts facilities.

=== Heads of school ===
- Caroline D. Hewitt: 1920–1942
- Charlotte Comfort: 1942–circa 1960s
- Janet Mayer: 1969 - 1980
- Agathe Crouter: 1980 - 1990
- Mary Jane Yurchak: 1990 - 2000
- Linda MacMurray Gibbs: 2000 - 2010
- Joan Lonergan: 2010 - 2015
- Tara Christie Kinsey: 2015 - 2025
- Jennifer Zaccara: 2025 - current

The Hewitt School has a board of directors and a leadership team.

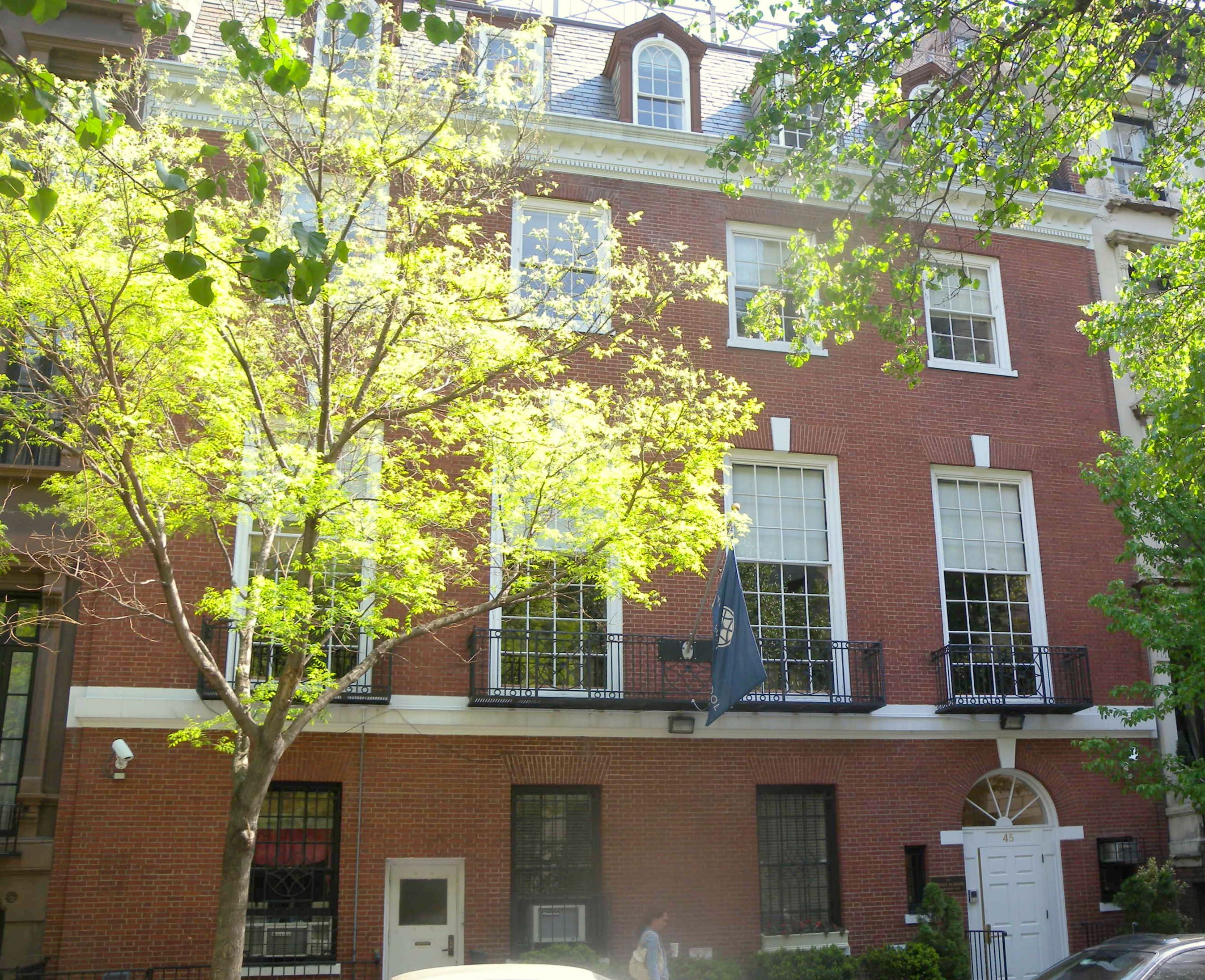
Hewitt's main entrance – Stillman Building – 45 East 75th St.

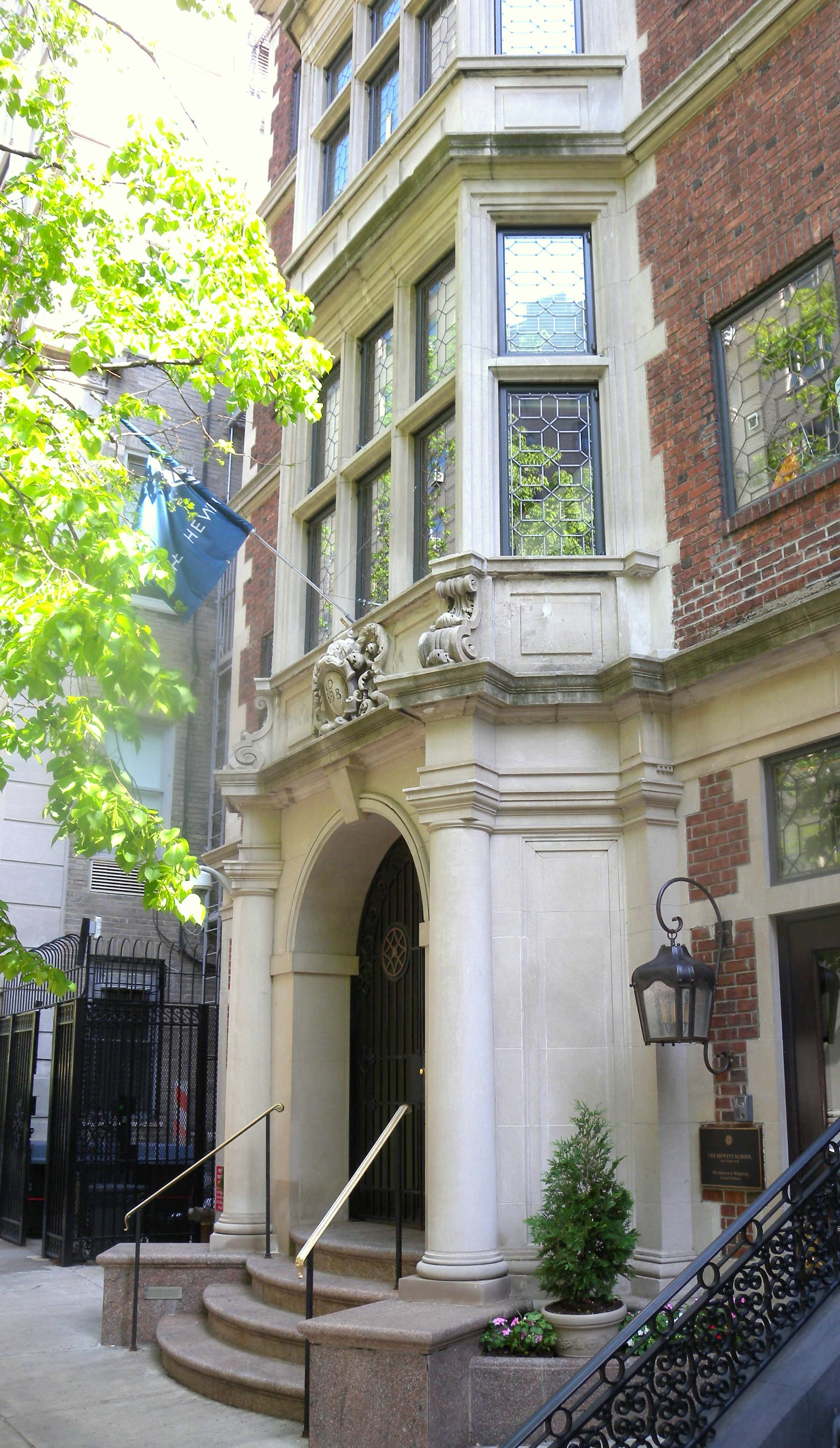
Hewitt's Lower School – McKelvey Building – grades k - 3, 3 East 76th St.

== Academics ==
The school has three divisions: Lower School, Middle School, and Upper School.

=== Lower School (K - 4th grade) ===
The Lower School at The Hewitt School serves elementary school students from kindergarten through fourth grade, with a curriculum focusing on skills in literacy, mathematics, science, and social studies. Instruction emphasizes writing as a process that involves brainstorming, drafting, revising, and publishing. Mathematics education focuses on hands-on learning, problem-solving, and building strong number sense and computational skills. Students also engage in technology use, arts, physical education.

=== Middle School (5th - 8th grade) ===
The middle school at The Hewitt School encompasses grades five through eight.

=== Upper School (9th - 12th grade) ===
The upper school at The Hewitt School serves high school girls in grades nine through twelve.

The Hewitt School provides STEM education, science, technology, engineering, and mathematics classes starting in the lower school. Other areas of focus are the foreign language program, the creative arts program, which includes both visual and performing arts, and varsity sports teams.

== Admissions ==
The school admits girls from kindergarten through 12th grade, with selectivity at the middle and upper school entry points. Admission decisions are based on a combination of academic records, teacher recommendations, standardized test scores (such as the SSAT or ISEE), interviews, and essays.

== Student Life ==
The Hewitt School has approximately 475 students enrolled in its K-12 program.

=== Co-curricular activities ===
The Hewitt School offers a diverse range of extracurricular activities. Students can participate in various clubs such as debate, robotics, math Olympiad, sustainability initiatives, and student council, which encourage leadership, collaboration, and community engagement.

The school also hosts arts organizations including theater productions, choir, and visual arts exhibitions. Hewitt puts on several student productions each year, including an upper school play, middle and upper school musical, middle school play, and a series of music concerts.

Athletics programs include volleyball and other team sports, supporting physical fitness and teamwork. Hewitt competes in cross country, golf, track and field, tennis, soccer, softball, volleyball, squash, basketball, and badminton.

There are specialized after-school classes in areas like 3D printing, coding, creative writing, and culinary arts.

Other opportunities include:

- Hewitt annually participates in New York City's Middle School Model Congress.
- Hewitt Robotics team regularly qualify for VEX IQ State Championships and have competed in the VEX Robotics Competition World Championships.
- Hewitt’s Signature Extended Inquiry (EI) program encourages students in grades 9-12 to deepen their understanding of subject material through independent research.

== Center for Girls' Research and Leadership ==
The Center for Girls' Research and Leadership at the Hewitt School, formerly known as the Center for Gender and Ethical Leadership in Society, was established in October 2022. It is a hub for research and action aimed at fostering girls' leadership and addressing gender equity.

The Center collaborates with educators, scholars, and industry partners to develop research-informed practices and curricula that enhance girls' experiences in education and leadership development. It supports student and faculty research initiatives, including youth action research and capstone projects, encouraging students to investigate real-world challenges and create impact within their communities.

The Center's work emphasizes ethical leadership and social responsibility, providing tools and training for teachers across grade levels to cultivate leadership skills and awareness of gender-related barriers.

It is the only independent school in the United States with a research initiative dedicated to studying systemic change for girls and young women.

== Memberships/affiliations ==
- The National Association of Independent Schools (NAIS)
- The New York State Association of Independent Schools (NYSAIS)
- The Parents League of New York
- Independent School Admission Association of Greater New York (ISAAGNY)
- The International Coalition of Girls Schools
- Prep for Prep
