= James De La Vega =

American artist (born 1972)

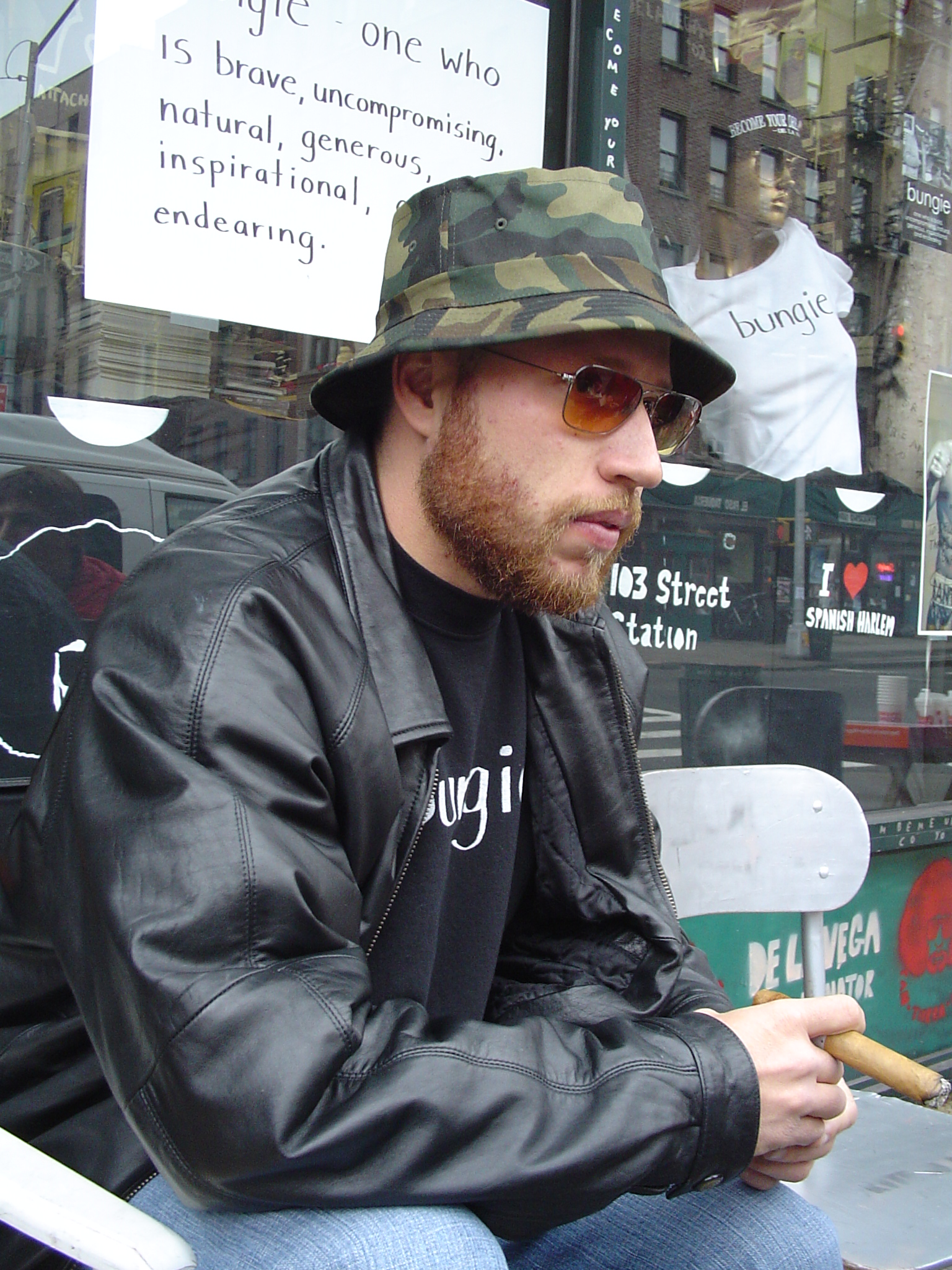
- De La Vega in November 2004
- Born: 1972 (age 53–54); East Harlem, New York, US
- Education: York Preparatory School
- Parents: Jaime de la Vega (father); Elsie Matos (mother)
- Website: DE LA VEGA on Instagram

James de la Vega (born 1972) is an American visual artist of Puerto Rican descent who lives in New York City. He has produced street aphorisms and muralist art.

== Early life and education ==
De la Vega was born in East Harlem, New York City, the son of Jaime de la Vega and Elsie Matos.

He graduated valedictorian at York Preparatory School on Manhattan's Upper West Side and attended Cornell University in Ithaca, New York, where he graduated in 1994 with a Bachelor of Fine Arts.

== Career ==
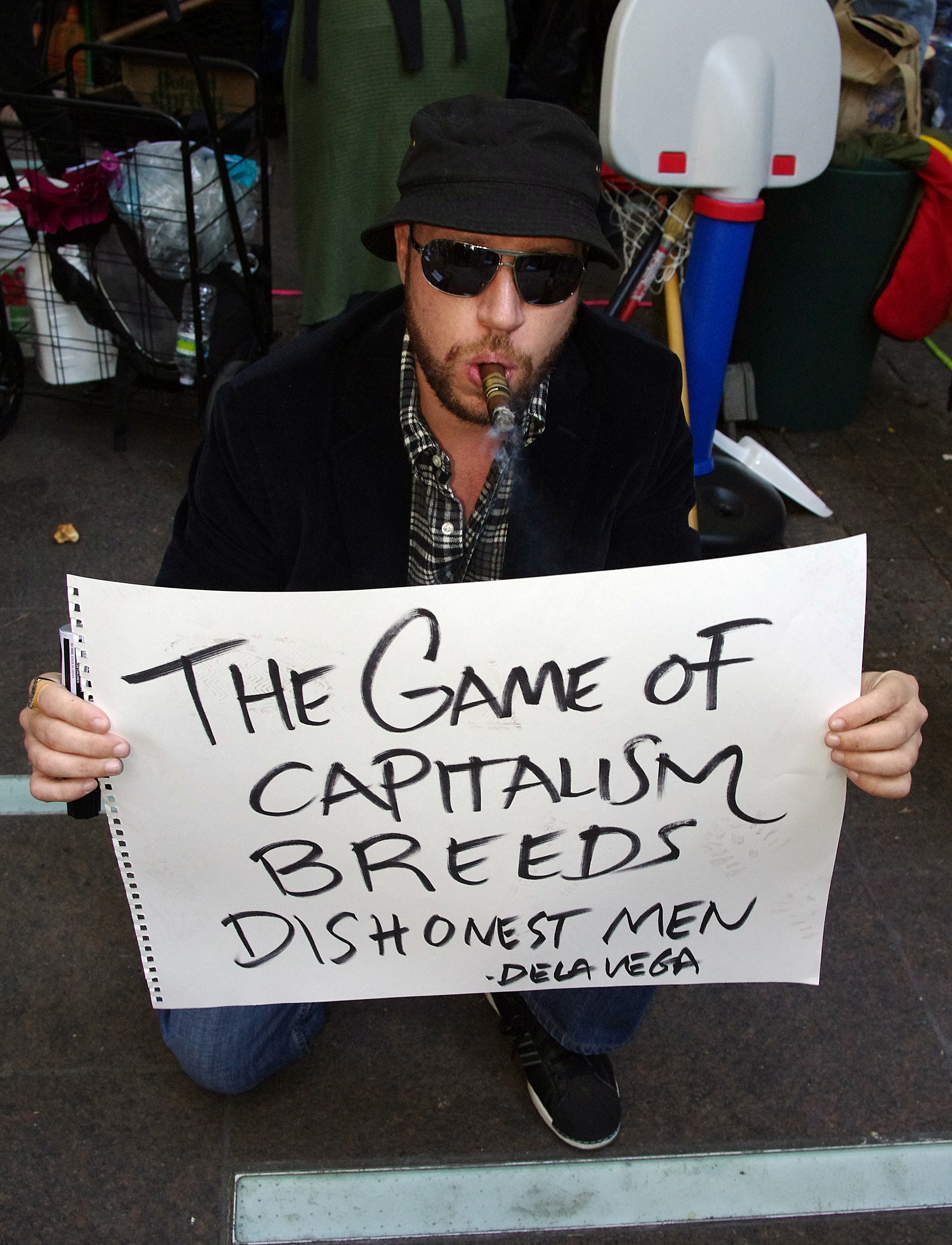
de la Vega participating in an Occupy Wall Street protest in October 2011

De la Vega is a former art teacher at York Preparatory School, his alma mater.

In 2003, de la Vega failed to win a primary for the New York State Senate while campaigning on healthcare access for Spanish Harlem residents.

There have been difficult times for de la Vega. He got sick, and when his mother died, he lost his storage where he had merchandise, paintings, and many other items.

He was featured as a live-action character in the backdoor pilot "Postcards from Buster" from the animated series Arthur, as "Dr. De La Vega" while characters Arthur and Buster toured New York City with their camcorder.

De la Vega is known as a community-inspiring artist. Those who come across his work know him primarily for his murals and sidewalk chalk drawings. His murals can be found mostly in East Harlem, and his chalk drawings may show up anywhere in Manhattan. His street drawings are usually accompanied by aphoristic messages such as "Become Your Dream." Legally, his outdoor work qualifies as graffiti, although many put the work in a separate genre.

De la Vega was a recipient of a Joan Mitchell Foundation Painters & Sculptors Grant in 1999.

De la Vega was featured in the MoMA PS1 (Queens) exhibit 100 Drawings in the spring of 1999 alongside other contemporary artists, including Danica Phelps, Rob Pruitt, Amy Gartrell, and Olav Westphalen.

In 2000, he participated in the Mountain Lake Workshop, organized by Ray Kass, where he collaborated with students and community members on a mural project integrating his signature street art techniques with local cultural narratives.

Christie's auction house has featured some of his work, and fans were able to view his more-intimate work in his East Village gallery until the location closed in 2010.

In 2011, de la Vega collaborated with designer Tory Burch to create a line of accessories that benefited the Tory Burch Foundation.

De la Vega quietly disappeared from the art scene in 2012 following a cancer diagnosis and subsequent treatment.

On September 28, 2023, the Dynamic Arts Gallery in the Bronx was to present a new exhibit titled De La Vega Museum. The gallery, located at 770 Castle Hill Avenue, was to continue the exhibit until November 7.

In July 2003, de la Vega was charged with vandalism for a mural he painted on a blank wall in the Bronx. He was offered one-year probation in exchange for a guilty plea, but he refused to say he caused "damage" to the property and thus sentenced to fifty hours of community service.

=== Apple iPhone 5s ad campaign ===
In May 2014, de la Vega filed a cease-and-desist letter to Apple, claiming its new ad campaign for the iPhone 5S uses his trademarked slogan, "You are more powerful than you think". Apple's usage of the slogan "clearly misleads customers into believing de la Vega somehow supports, approves and/or endorses its products", it apparently adds.
