= Brearley School =

Coordinates: 40°46′21″N 73°56′44″W

The Brearley School

Location
- 610 East 83rd Street; New York City, NY; United States

Information
- Type: All-girls; Private; Day; College-preparatory; Nonsectarian
- Motto: By Truth and Toil
- Established: 1884; 142 years ago
- Founder: Samuel Brearley
- Head of School: Jenny C. Rao
- Faculty: 122
- Grades: Kindergarten – grade 12
- Enrollment: 772 (2024–2025)
- Student to teacher ratio: 6:1
- Colors: Red and white
- Mascot: Beverly Beaver
- Rival: Chapin School
- Endowment: $160 million (August 2024)
- Website: brearley.org

The Brearley School is an American all-girls private school on the Upper East Side of Manhattan, New York City. It educates approximately 770 girls in grades K–12, with approximately 55 to 65 students per grade.

In addition to being a member of the New York Interschool Association, Brearley is considered a sister school of the all-boys Collegiate School and the nearby all-girls Chapin School, with which it shares an after-school program and some classes.

== History ==
Samuel A. Brearley founded The Brearley School in 1884, and remained the head of school until 1886, when he died of typhoid fever. James G. Croswell was the next head until his death in 1915. Since 1926, Brearley has been headed by women, first by Millicent Carey McIntosh.

In December 2011, Jane Foley Fried replaced former head of school Stephanie J. Hull who had resigned for undisclosed reasons. Fried became Brearley's 15th head of school. Jenny Rao replaced Fried as head of school in 2025.

== Academics and reputation ==
=== Curriculum and resources ===
The school's curriculum is based on the liberal arts. The student-to-faculty ratio is 6:1.

Language instruction is offered in Latin, French, Spanish, and Mandarin Chinese.

=== Rankings and college attendance ===
The New York Times describes Brearley as "one of the most competitive, academically rigorous private schools in the city." Brearley has been recognized in several lists of schools that send their students to selective universities.

- 2002: Worth magazine ranked Brearley #2 in the nation (and the #1 school that admits girls) for sending students to Harvard, Yale, or Princeton. Between 1998 and 2001, 20.9% of Brearley graduates matriculated at one of these three schools.
- 2008: The Wall Street Journal ranked Brearley #2 in the nation (and the #1 school that admits girls) for sending students to eight selective colleges and universities.
- 2016: MainStreet ranked Brearley #3 in the nation for sending students to the Ivy League schools. 37% of Brearley graduates matriculated at one of these eight schools.

In addition, for 2025, Niche ranked Brearley the nation's top girls' school and the nation's third-best private K-12 school.

In the five-year period from 2020 to 2024, Brearley placed 124 students at Ivy League schools. Approximately 60-65 girls graduate from Brearley every year.

== Student body ==
In the 2024–25 school year, Brearley reported that 56% of its 772 students identified as people of color.

In the 2021–22 school year, Brearley reported that of its 768 students, 308 (40.1%) were white, 161 (21.0%) were Asian, 58 (7.6%) were Hispanic, 54 (7.0%) were black, and 187 (24.3%) were multiracial. The school was not permitted to include students in two or more categories.

== Finances ==
=== Tuition and financial aid ===
Tuition for the 2024–25 academic year is $64,100. 20% of the student body was on financial aid, and the average grant was approximately $58,552, or 91% of tuition. The school stated that it covered 100% of admitted students' demonstrated financial need.

In 2024, the school announced that moving forward, students with household incomes at or below $100,000 (5% of the student body in 2024–25) will attend Brearley for free. That year, 75% of financial aid students had household incomes over $100,000.

The school states that "applying for financial assistance does not impact our determination of your child's admissibility."

=== Endowment and expenses ===
In August 2024, Brearley's endowment stood at "around $160 million." In its Internal Revenue Service filings for the 2022–23 school year, Brearley reported total assets of $360.2 million, net assets of $275.9 million, investment holdings of $181.2 million, and cash holdings of $13.4 million. Brearley also reported $38.7 million in program service expenses and $7.1 million in grants (primarily student financial aid).

== Campus ==
Brearley has been headquartered on a 12-story building on 610 East 83rd Street since 1929. The school previously occupied quarters on East 45th Street, West 44th Street, and the corner of Park Avenue and East 61st Street.

The building is at full capacity, but in 2015, the school announced that it would not seek an alternative site. Instead, it renovated the main building and expanded into three other buildings. Brearley opened a new building at 590 East 83rd Street in Fall 2019 to house its lower school program.

A separate building, the "Field House" on East 87th Street, has facilities for physical education and athletics including track, soccer, basketball, tennis, badminton, volleyball, lacrosse and field hockey. Brearley also utilizes other sports facilities frequently, such as Randall's Island and Asphalt Green.

== Athletics ==
Brearley fields varsity teams in 13 sports. The school's team colors are red and white, and its mascot is a beaver.

== Heads of School ==
Since its founding in 1884, The Brearley School has been led by 13 permanent heads of school (originally titled headmaster or headmistress).

No.	Name	Tenure	Notes
1	Samuel A. Brearley Jr.	1884–1886	Educated at Harvard University and Balliol College, Oxford, Brearley founded the school in 1884 to provide young women with a rigorous college-preparatory education before dying suddenly of typhoid fever two years later at age 36.
2	James Greenleaf Croswell	1886–1915	Serving the longest tenure in school history at 29 years, the former Harvard Greek professor instituted Brearley's "Last Day" commencement tradition in 1899—forbidding diplomas, caps, and gowns because he believed education was never truly finished.
3	Henry Dwight Sedgwick	1915–1916	A lawyer, historian, and prolific essayist, Sedgwick stepped in to lead the school for a single academic year following Croswell's sudden death.
4	Carl Van Doren	1916–1919	A noted literary critic and future Pulitzer Prize for Biography winner, Van Doren led Brearley through World War I before departing to become literary editor of The Nation.
5	George Norton Northrup	1920–1926	Formerly an English professor at the University of Minnesota, Northrup served as the final male headmaster in Brearley's history.
6	Anne Dunn	1926–1928	Appointed in 1926, Dunn became the first woman to permanently lead the school, inaugurating an unbroken line of female leadership that continues to the present.
7	Millicent Carey McIntosh	1930–1947	Recruited from Bryn Mawr College, McIntosh modernized the curriculum and raised five children while serving as headmistress before leaving in 1947 to become the first president of Barnard College.
8	Jean Fair Mitchell	1947–1975	Remembered by alumnae for her spirited wit, Scottish brogue, and uncompromising academic standards, Mitchell led Brearley for 28 years—the second-longest tenure in school history.
9	Evelyn Janover Halpert	1975–1997	A member of the Brearley Class of 1952 and former History Department chair, Halpert became the first alumna to lead the school, expanding financial aid and facilities over a 22-year tenure.
10	Priscilla M. Winn Barlow	1997–2003	A British-educated biologist who previously served as Principal of Havergal College in Toronto, Winn Barlow championed STEM education and global initiatives during her six-year leadership.
11	Stephanie J. Hull	2003–2011	A scholar of French and women's studies formerly at Dartmouth College, Hull made history in 2003 as the first African American head of school in Brearley's history.
12	Jane Foley Fried	2012–2025	Formerly Dean of Admission at Phillips Academy, Fried guided Brearley through the COVID-19 pandemic and its 2019 expansion into a second building at 590 East 83rd Street.
13	Jennifer C. Rao	2025–present	Previously Head of Emma Willard School in Troy, New York, Rao assumed office as Brearley's head of school in July 2025.

== Affiliated organizations ==
- National Association of Independent Schools
- New York State Association of Independent Schools
- New York Interschool Association
