= Birch Wathen Lenox School =

Location
- 210 East 77th Street; Manhattan, New York City, New York 10075; United States; 40°46′21″N 73°57′27.5″W

Information
- Former names: Birch Wathen School (1921); Lenox School (1916)
- Type: Private, Coeducational
- Motto: Integrity, Civility, Loyalty
- Established: 1991 (as Birch Wathen Lenox School)
- Head of school: Bill E. Kuhn
- Faculty: 70
- Grades: K-12
- Enrollment: 500 (total); 175 (grades 9–12)
- Campus size: Single Building
- Campus type: Brownstone
- Colors: Blue and White
- Athletics: All major high school varsity sports
- Mascot: Lion
- Publication: Leaves
- Newspaper: The Clarion
- Website: bwl.org

The Birch Wathen Lenox School is a college preparatory K-12 school on the Upper East Side of Manhattan in New York City. Birch Wathen Lenox comprises approximately 500 students from all around New York City. The Birch Wathen Lenox School is one of 322 independent schools located in the city.

== History ==
Birch Wathen Lenox was created in 1991 through the merger of the Birch Wathen School (founded in 1921 by Louise Birch and Edith Wathen), and The Lenox School (founded in 1916 by Jessica Garretson Finch).

The Lenox School had been an all-girls school until 1974, when it went co-educational.

Between 1962 and 1989, Birch Wathen was located in the Herbert N. Straus House, an ornate French-style building at 9 East 71st Street across from the Frick Collection

== Sports ==
Birch Wathen Lenox fields teams in soccer, volleyball, swimming, basketball, baseball, cross country, track and field, golf, tennis, hockey, and robotics.

Athletic teams play under the auspices of the Independent Schools Athletic League (New York) or the Girls Independent School Athletic League, which are leagues in the NYSAISAA (New York State Association of Independent Schools Athletic Association).

The robotics team plays in the FIRST Robotics Competition, more commonly referred to as FRC.

== Notable alumni ==
- Kathy Acker, writer
- Josh Bekenstein, businessperson
- Joan Birman, mathematician
- Hope Cooke, last Queen of Sikkim
- Barbara Costikyan, food writer
- Joel Crothers (BW '58), actor
- Viola Essen, dancer
- Robert Gottlieb, president of Knopf Publishing.
- John Katzman, edupreneur, CEO of Noodle
- Alfred A Knopf, Jr., publisher
- Judith Krantz (BW '44), novelist
- Wendy Mogel, psychologist and author
- Murray Rothbard (BW '42), Founder of anarcho-capitalism
- Edwin Schlossberg, designer
- Mary Stolz (BW '36), novelist
- Gardiner L. Tucker (BW '43), former director of IBM Research, Assistant Secretary of State, Assistant Secretary General of NATO
- Barbara Walters, journalist, writer, and media personality
