= Immaculata Academy (Hamburg, New York) =

Location
- 5138 South Park Avenue; Hamburg, (Erie County), New York 14075; United States; 42°45′25″N 78°49′23″W

Information
- Type: Private, All-Female (1928-2016)
- Religious affiliations: Roman Catholic; Franciscan Sisters
- Established: 1928
- Status: closed (2016)
- Grades: 9-12
- Student to teacher ratio: 9:1 (2016)
- Campus size: 25 acres (100,000 m^{2})
- Colors: Blue and White
- Team name: Bears
- Accreditation: Middle States Association of Colleges and Schools
- Website: www.immaculataacademy.com

Immaculata Academy was a private, Roman Catholic high school for girls in Hamburg, New York within the Diocese of Buffalo.

== Background ==
Immaculata Academy was established in 1928 by the Franciscan Sisters of St. Joseph and closed June 2016. More than 4,200 girls attended the school during this time. While functioning, the school was the "sister school" to St. Francis High School. After the school closed, a luxury apartment complex was opened on its site, with mostly new buildings but using the school's gym.
