= School of the Holy Child =

Location
- 2225 Westchester Avenue; Harrison (Rye address), (Westchester County), New York 10580; United States; 41°0′42″N 73°42′17″W

Information
- Type: Private, day, college-preparatory
- Motto: Actions. Not Words.
- Religious affiliation: Roman Catholic
- Established: 1904 (122 years ago)
- Founder: Cornelia Connelly
- CEEB code: 334–972
- Head of school: Colleen R. Pettus
- Faculty: 93
- Grades: 5–12
- Gender: Girls
- Enrollment: 385
- Average class size: 14
- Student to teacher ratio: 7:1
- Campus size: Over 20 acres (8.1 ha)
- Campus type: Suburban
- Colors: Navy and white
- Mascot: Gryphon
- Team name: Gryphons
- Publication: Glimpses
- Newspaper: The Cornelian
- Yearbook: Traces
- Website: holychildrye.org

School of the Holy Child, established in 1904, is an American all-girls, Catholic, independent, college-preparatory school for grades 5 through 12, located in Harrison, New York (with a Rye postal address).

The school is guided by the educational philosophy of Cornelia Connelly, the founder of the Society of the Holy Child Jesus, and her dedication to developing "young women of conscience and action".

== Description ==
School of the Holy Child is an all-girls, Catholic, independent school for grades 5–12, where students grow into women of conscience and action. Grounded in the spirit of Cornelia Connelly, the School is known for cultivating confident leaders through a distinctive blend of rigorous academics, joyful learning, and immersive, real-world experiences.

Holy Child enrolls students from nearly 70 communities in Westchester, Fairfield, Putnam, New York and Bronx counties. The curriculum spans the humanities, global and religious studies, STEM, engineering and architecture, the arts, and athletics, with strong programs in field-based and service learning with an emphasis on leadership development. Signature programs like Engineering and Design, Advanced Humanities Institute and Leadership in Finance challenge students to think critically, act ethically, and design solutions for the common good—both locally and globally.

The School’s 20-acre campus in Rye, New York, balances historic charm and modern innovation. At its heart is a 1930s Tudor Revival mansion, originally the private home of T.V. Soong, is complemented by modern dynamic academic and extracurricular spaces. The 22,000-square-foot Field House features the Kelly Gymnasium, Giordano Fitness Center, Ciaccia Athletic Training Room, a dance studio, and the Kennedy Common Room. A theater opened in 2016, enriching the performing arts experience for all students.

In October 2025, Holy Child opened The Kelly Center for Inspiration, a state-of-the-art academic building designed to support collaboration, creativity, and experiential learning. With classroom suites, fab lab, studio space for podcasting, and breakout spaces for research and exploration, The Kelly Center enhances the School’s commitment to student-centered education and leadership development.
