= Marymount School of New York =

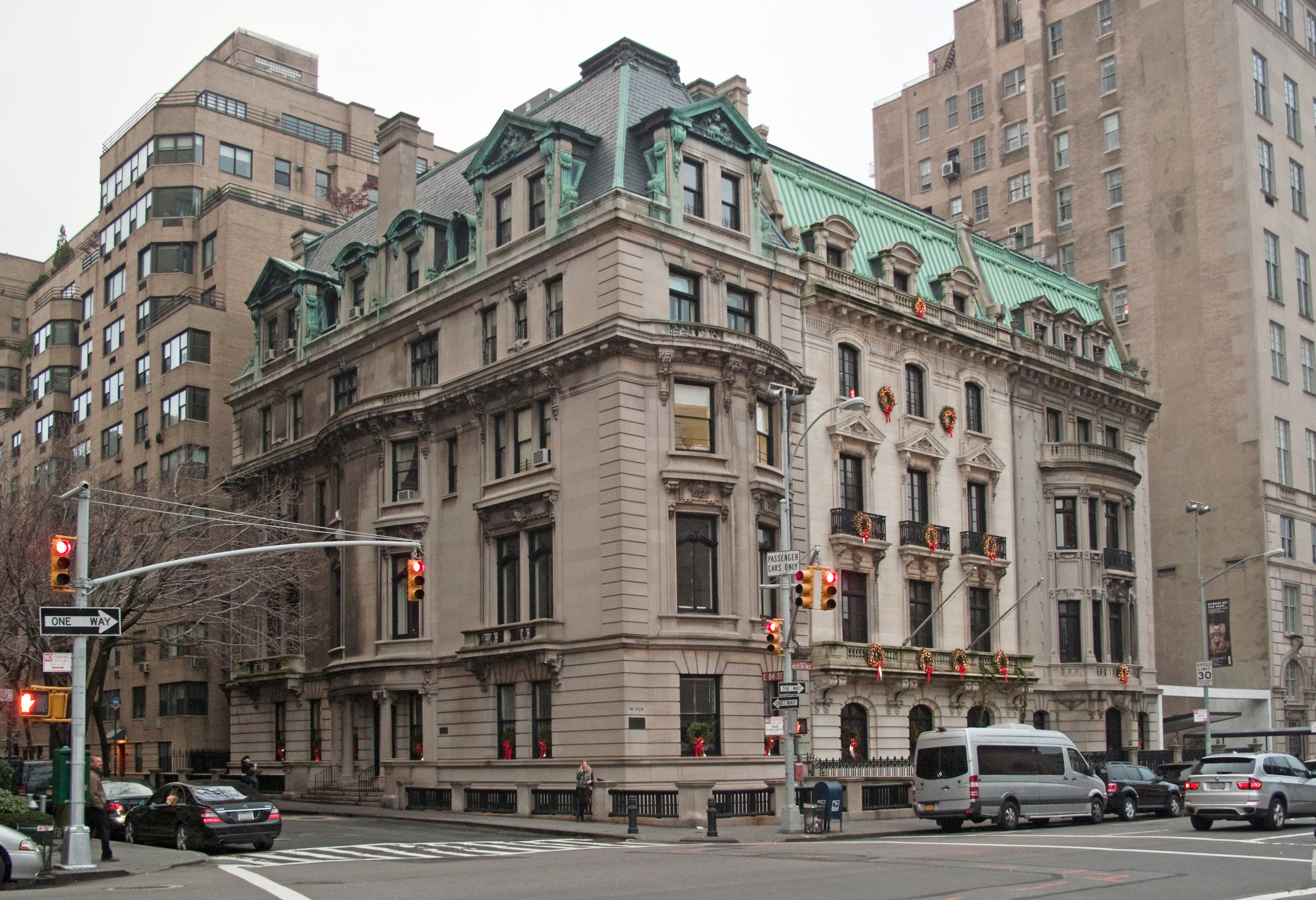
- Fifth Avenue and East 84th Street

Location
- 1026 Fifth Avenue (Upper East Side, Manhattan); New York City, New York 10028; United States; 40°46′47.5″N 73°57′40.5″W

Information
- Type: Independent, college-preparatory, day
- Religious affiliation: Roman Catholic
- Established: 1926 (100 years ago)
- School code: 333800
- Headmistress: Lorraine A. Riley
- Grades: Nursery – 12
- Gender: Girls
- Enrollment: 700+
- Student to teacher ratio: 6:1
- Campus type: Urban
- Colors: Navy blue and white
- Song: "Let Us Raise High the Banners"
- Athletics conference: Athletic Association of Independent Schools
- Mascot: Lion
- Team name: Lions
- Rival: Convent of the Sacred Heart
- Newspaper: The Joritan
- Yearbook: The Marifia
- Affiliation: New York State Association of Independent Schools
- Admissions Director: Megan Klingenberger
- Website: marymountnyc.org
- Houses at 1026-1028 Fifth Ave.
- U.S. National Register of Historic Places
- U.S. Historic district
- New York State Register of Historic Places
- Location within Manhattan Location within New York City Location within New York
- Location: 1026-1028 Fifth Ave., New York, New York
- Coordinates: 40°46′47″N 73°57′42″W
- Area: less than one acre
- Built: 1901
- Architect: C. P. H. Gilbert; Van Vleck & Goldsmith
- Architectural style: Beaux Arts
- NRHP reference No.: 99000197
- NYSRHP No.: 06101.013961, 06101.010484, 06101.000347

Significant dates
- Added to NRHP: February 12, 1999
- Designated NYSRHP: December 15, 1998

Marymount School of New York is an American college preparatory, independent, Catholic day school for girls located on the Upper East Side of Manhattan in New York City, New York.

It was founded by Mother Marie Joseph Butler in 1926 as part of a network of schools directed by the Religious of the Sacred Heart of Mary. The school enrolls students in nursery through class XII.

== History ==
Founded by Mother Marie Joseph Butler in 1926, Marymount School is part of a network of schools directed by the Religious of the Sacred Heart of Mary (RSHM).

The RSHM was established in 1849 in Béziers, France, by Père Gailhac and Mère St. Jean. They expanded their ministry to the United States in 1877.

Mother Butler purchased the Florence Vanderbilt estate at 1028 Fifth Avenue in 1926 and founded Marymount School of New York. The adjoining Pratt mansion at 1027 Fifth Avenue was acquired in 1936, and the school expanded to the Dunlevy Milbank property at 1026 in 1950. The three turn-of-the-century Beaux-Arts buildings at Houses at 1026–1028 Fifth Avenue occupy approximately half the block between 83rd and 84th Streets on Fifth Avenue.

== Facilities ==
The Lower and Lower Middle Schools (Nursery-Class V) are housed at 1026–1028 Fifth Avenue at 84th Street. These buildings were built in 1901 by architect C. P. H. Gilbert and the architectural firm Van Vleck & Goldsmith. The buildings were listed on the National Register of Historic Places in 1999 as the Houses at 1026–1028 Fifth Avenue; the listing included three contributing buildings. 1026 and 1027 were designed by Van Vleck & Goldsmith; 1028 was designed by Gilbert. Joseph Van Vleck (1876–1942) and Goldwin Goldsmith were architectural partners.

== Notable alumnae ==
- Stella Araneta (born 1939) – Colombian-Filipino pageant director and beauty queen
- Pelin Batu – Turkish author, actress, historian, and television personality
- Cher Calvin (born 1974) – news presenter
- Marta Casals Istomin – musician
- Margarita Forés (1959– 2025) – Filipino chef
- Julianne Michelle (born 1984) – actress
- Alicia Nash (1933–2015) – Salvadoran-American physicist
- Maria Teresa (born 1956) – Grand Duchess of Luxembourg
- Natalie Trundy (1940–2019) – actress

== Notable faculty ==
- Nicole Ross (born 1989) – Olympic foil fencer
