= Staten Island Academy =

Coordinates: 40°35′41″N 74°06′33″W

Location
- 715 Todt Hill Road; Staten Island, New York; United States

Information
- Type: Private, college prep
- Motto: Libertas, Integritas, Decora
- Established: 1884
- Founder: Anton Methfessel
- Head of school: Eileen F. Corigliano
- Grades: Pre-K – 12
- Gender: Co-ed
- Enrollment: ~390
- Colors: Maroon & gold
- Mascot: Tiger
- Website: Staten Island Academy

Staten Island Academy is a coeducational, college-preparatory day school located on a 14-acre (57,000 m^{2}) campus in Staten Island, New York City, United States. Founded in 1884 by Anton Methfessel, it is the oldest independent school on Staten Island, and is the only independent school (non-public, non-religious) in the borough. It educates students from pre-kindergarten through grade 12. The current enrollment is around 390 students, with a student to teacher ratio of 7:1. Eileen Corigliano is the current head of school. The school is composed of three divisions: Lower School, Pre-K-Gr. 4; Middle School, Gr. 5-8; Upper School, Gr. 9-12. The campus has seven buildings: the Early Childhood Building, the Art Barn, Haugen Hall, Kearns Hall, Crowe Hall, Alumni Hall and the OJ Buck Gymnasium. The school's accreditations include the Middle States Association of Colleges and Schools, and the New York State Association of Independent Schools. It is chartered and registered by the Board of Regents, University of the State of New York.

== History ==
=== Founding and early years ===
The Academy was formally chartered on September 5, 1884 by Anton Methfessel and prominent educators that helped merge the Methfessel Institute, which was founded in 1862, with the original Staten Island Academy and Latin School. It rapidly expanded, dropped the phrase “Latin School” from its name, and gained prominence with a curriculum that was progressive for its day. In 1885, required courses for the Intermediate Form (grades 9-12) included Latin, German, French, English, geography, physiology, zoology, mathematics, history, natural philosophy, expression, music, and drawing. The Academic Form required more advanced study, and The Latin School division mandated, additionally, student literacy in both Latin and Greek.

Many prominent professionals in theater, education, literature, politics and business were associated with the Academy throughout this period including actor Sidney Wollett, North Pole explorer Admiral Perry, Booker T. Washington, the Vanderbilt family, Jacob Riis, and George William Curtis, a member of the Academy's Board of Trustees and the namesake for Curtis High School.

In 1891 the school bought land at the corner of Wall Street and Academy Place, a street that was named after the school, in the St. George section of Staten Island. Because of the expanding student population, a grand new building of English architectural design was built, and the cornerstone was laid in December 1895. The new building was dedicated at commencement in June 1896. The historic cornerstone now stands outside Alumni Hall on the school's Todt Hill campus, while the original building is now the Staten Island Museum.

=== 21st century ===
The fall of 2002 marked a new chapter in the Academy's history with the installation of Diane J. Hulse as the 15th Head of School. During the summer of 2003, the Stanley Library was completely renovated, the Patrick Commons dining hall was upgraded, new playground equipment was installed, and outdoor benches and tables were added. A school fitness center was opened in late 2003. In the summer of 2004, the school's athletics fields were upgraded. The Alexander Robbins Steinman Foundation partially funded the project in honor of Alex Steinman, Class of 1986, who died on 9/11. Other projects included the restoration of the Art Barn and the Haugen Hall entry steps, upgrades to classrooms, the art room, and computer labs.

In Spring 2018, the Renaissance Campaign was announced, which is a five-year development to drastically reshape the Academy. Over $6.02 million has currently been funded, with a stated goal of $10 million. Some of the funds will be used for financial aid for “qualified students”. As part of the campaign, Crowe Hall will be completely renovated and expanded, notably the addition of classrooms on the second floor and an overall area expansion of the first floor. Construction was hoped to begin in early 2019.

== Heads of School ==
- Anton Methfessel, 1862–1884
- Frederick E. Partington, 1884–1907
- Frank C. Page, 1907–1920
- Dr. John F. Dunne, 1920–1925
- Charles H. Garrison, 1925–29
- Thomas Burton, 1929–1933
- Charles L.S. Easton, 1933–1935
- Stephen J. Botsford, 1935–1942
- Dr. Harold E. Merrick, 1942–1962
- Harvey H. MacArthur, 1962–1967
- Dr. Mary E. Meade, 1967–1968
- Peter M. Webster, 1968–1976
- Dr. J. Stevens Bean, 1976–1989
- F. Graham Brown Jr., 1989–1996
- Carmen M. Marnell, 1996–2002
- Diane J. Hulse I, 2002–2012
- Albert R. Cauz, 2012–2022
- Dr. Eileen Corigliano 2022-

== Athletics ==
The Academy's mascot is the tiger, and its colors are maroon and gold. Athletic offerings include Cross Country, Baseball, Soccer, Tennis, Golf, Softball, Basketball, Volleyball and Lacrosse.

=== 2014 ===
The Girl's Varsity Tennis team went undefeated in both the Catholic High School Athletic Association (CHSAA) and PSAA tennis leagues, winning the season and playoff championships.

The Girl's Varsity Basketball team championed the Lady Tigers Holiday Tournament and the Fieldston Tip-Off Tournament.

The Girl's Varsity Lacrosse team championed the AAIS league. The team also participated in the NYSAIS tournament.

=== 2015 ===
The Boy's Varsity Volleyball team championed the PSAA regular season and playoffs.

The Girl's Varsity Basketball team championed the Lady Tigers Holiday Tournament and the Fieldston Tip-Off Tournament.

The Girl's Varsity Softball team were the PSAA regular season champions. The team additionally were the NYS Federation "B" champions.

== Notable alumni ==
The Academy publicizes a "representative" list of "distinguished graduates". Among the alumni who achieved wider notability:

- Chris Agoliati, professional US soccer player.
- Oscar Auerbach, pathologist who helped prove that smoking causes lung cancer.
- O.J. Buck, World War II fighter pilot who died over Nazi Germany in 1942, two years after he graduated. The Gymnasium is named after him.
- Donald Davidson, Slusser Professor of Philosophy at the University of California, Berkeley.
- John Peoples Jr., director of Fermilab from 1989–1999, director of the Sloan Digital Sky Survey from 1998–2003.
- Joseph Rallo, Commissioner of Higher Education for Louisiana.
- Alan Seeger, poet and World War I hero (I Have a Rendezvous with Death); uncle of Pete Seeger.
