= Rye Country Day School =

Coordinates: 40.989712°N 73.680514°W

- Rye, New York; United States

Information
- Type: Independent
- Motto: Not for Self, but for Service
- Established: 1869
- Head of school: Randall Dunn
- Staff: 193
- Enrollment: 886
- Average class size: 15 students
- Student to teacher ratio: 8:1
- Campus: 35 acres (including East Campus)
- Colors: Blue and Gold
- Mascot: Willy the Wildcat
- Rival: Hackley School, Brunswick School
- Publication: Bulletin
- Newspaper: Rye Crop
- Yearbook: Echo
- Website: ryecountryday.org

Rye Country Day School, also known as Rye Country Day or RCDS, is an independent, co-educational college preparatory school located in Rye, New York. Its Upper School (grades 9–12), Middle School (5–8), and Lower School (Pre-Kindergarten-4) enroll a total of 886 students on its 35-acre campus. Rye Country Day attracts students from over 40 school districts in the tri-state area. The School's $5.9 million financial aid budget provides significant tuition grants to the families of 143 students (16%) in the school. 35% of RCDS students self-identify as people of color.

== Academics ==
RCDS has three divisions: Lower (Gr. K-4), Middle (Gr. 5-8), and Upper (Gr. 9-12). The school also offers a Pre-K program.

== Athletics ==
Starting in Grade 7, students play interscholastic sports. RCDS has a 45,000-square-foot Athletic Center with basketball and squash courts, locker rooms, a fitness center, and an athletic training room. The sports program has full-time coaches, as well as teachers who coach.

Fall Sports: Cross Country, Field Hockey, Football, Volleyball, and Soccer.
Winter Sports: Basketball, Fencing, Ice Hockey, Squash, Indoor Track and Field, and Wrestling.
Spring Sports: Baseball, Golf, Lacrosse, Sailing, Softball, Tennis, Track and Field.

== Campus facilities ==
The 35-acre campus includes academic buildings; two libraries; administrative buildings; a separate performing arts center with classrooms dance studio and a 450-seat theater-auditorium; a 23,000 square-foot innovative creative arts center; a 40,000 square-foot athletic center; and 4 turf fields.

Arts Facilities
The Cohen Center for the Creative Arts, a 23,000 square-foot creative arts center, built in 2018. Memorial Hall, built in 2010, seats 125. The Dunn Performing Arts Center has a 450-seat theater, along with dance studios, and band/choral/instrumental rehearsal spaces.

Athletics Facilities
Athletic facilities include four artificial turf fields; the Scott A. Nelson Athletic Center (2000), which houses a two-court gymnasium, four squash courts, four locker rooms, an athletic training facility, a fitness center and a multipurpose gymnasium that serves as the home for the wrestling and fencing programs; the LaGrange Field House (1972) with its indoor ice rink/tennis courts.

== History ==
Rye Country Day School was founded in 1869, when a group of local parents contacted the Reverend William Life and his wife, Susan, who ran a small school in Pennsylvania. The Lifes came to Rye and established the Rye Female Seminary under the direction of Susan Life. During its first year, 1869, sixty students (25 boarders and 35 day students) enrolled. The school was located on the present school property on Grandview Avenue. In 1896, two members of the faculty. Harriet and Mary Stowe, purchased the school. The Stowe sisters initiated significant changes in the curriculum, introducing college preparatory programs for the young women. A group of parents bought the Seminary in 1917 and established it as a nonprofit day school under the direction of a board of trustees.

The year 1921 saw the Seminary merge with a boys' school from nearby Harrison, the Rye Country School, and became known as the Rye Country Day Schools. In 1928, the "s" was dropped from the word "Schools". At this time, the School offered a program for girls from kindergarten through grade twelve, and a program for boys from kindergarten through grade nine. In 1964 the board of trustees extended the enrollment for boys through grade twelve.

Stephen Birmingham asserted in 1978 that the school was "elitist by design" and claimed that it was "a symbol of the gulf that exists between the wealthy and the less well off in the community" because there was allegedly no social contact between the students from the private school and those from the public.

== Notable alumni ==
- Edward Albee, playwright
- Christopher Atkins, actor
- Joshua Bennett, author and professor
- Barbara Bush, First Lady of the U.S.
- Edward Coristine, programmer
- John Treacy Egan, actor and singer
- Greg Fitzsimmons, comedian
- Raymond Khoury, author
- Nick Kroll, actor
- Elizabeth W. Smith
- Nicola Peltz, actor
- Emily Lazar, Grammy-winning mastering engineer
- Taylor Washington, MLS player
- Barry Mendel, movie producer
- Leila Pahlavi, Princess of Iran
