= Garden School =

School in New York City

Coordinates: 40°45′15″N 73°53′19″W

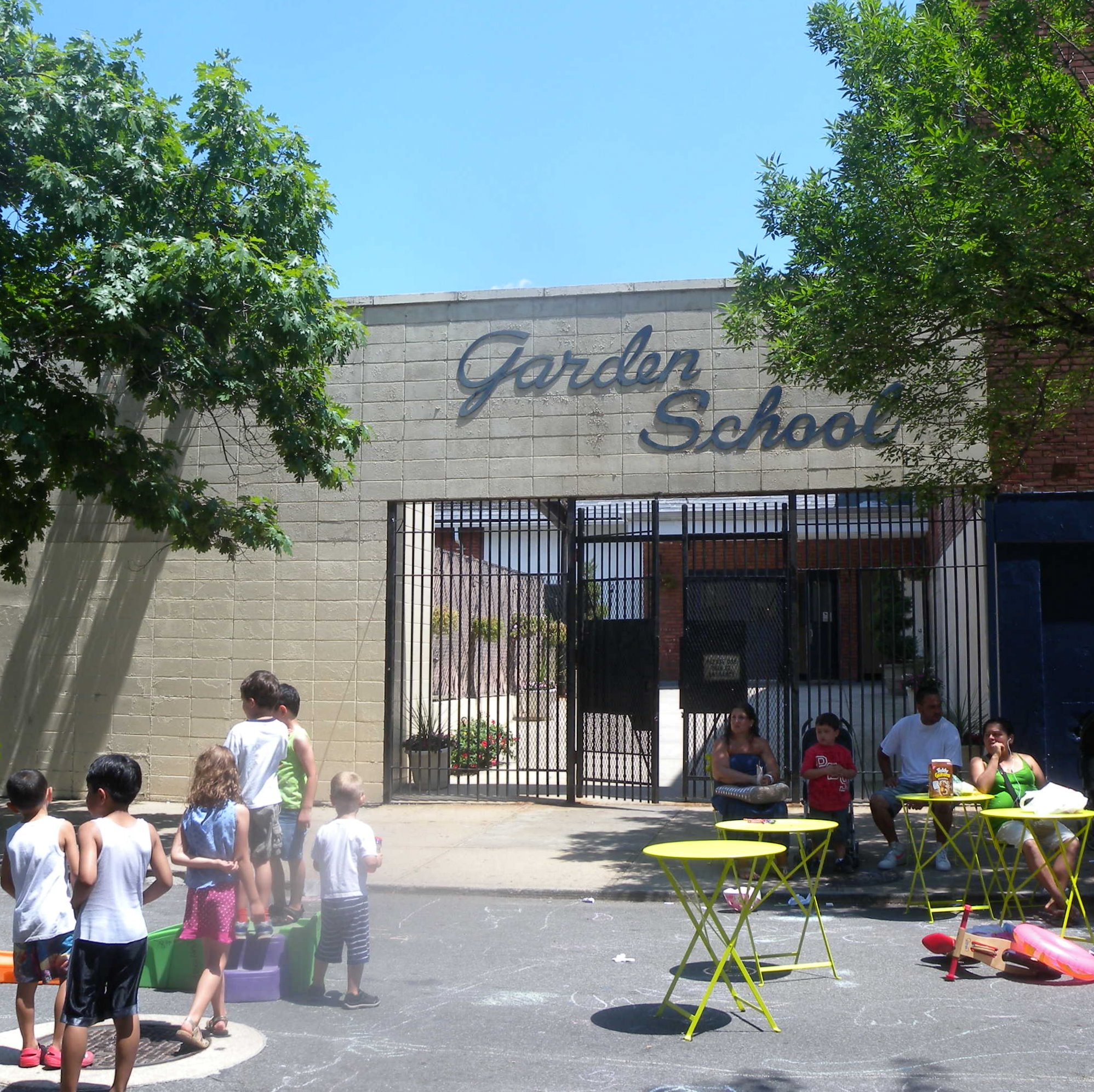
From 33-16 79th Street

Garden School is a co-educational independent school in East Elmhurst and Jackson Heights, Queens, New York City offering a K-12 education.

== History ==
Garden School was founded in 1923, taking its name from the newly conceived garden apartment complexes in the then-rural community of Jackson Heights.

The first classes were grades K–3 and met in the Laburnum Court Apartments under the guidance of Dorothy Gleen, Charles Townshend, and Josephine Wech. In 1925, grades 4–6 were added as John Bosworth Laing became the director. In 1927 Otis Flower assumed leadership as headmaster and moved the school to its current location. It had its first graduating class in 1929, presenting three students. Within three years Garden Country Day School became an independent school, with a board of trustees, under the New York State guidelines for not-for-profit schools.

Amid financial trouble in 2012, the school agreed to sell an athletic field to the city for $6 million.

The school's sports team, called the Garden Griffins, offers multiple sports per season.

As of 2025, Garden School is $28,408 per year for Nursery through Grade 12. There's a $500 sibling discount for each child after the first. Additionally, there are Junior and Senior fees of $200 each.

As of 2021, the Head of School is Christopher F. Herman.

=== Death of Rory Staunton ===
In 2012, Garden School contributed to the death of 12-year-old student Rory Staunton, who died from septic shock following a minor injury sustained at the school where Staunton scraped his arm. According to court filings and contemporaneous reporting, the injury was addressed by a gym teacher who applied a bandage; the wound was not cleaned, and Staunton was not sent to the school nurse. His parents were not notified of the injury.

Over the following days, Staunton developed symptoms including fever, vomiting, and diarrhoea. He was later hospitalized and died on April 1, 2012. Subsequent investigations and media reports raised concerns about the school’s injury-response procedures and its failure to notify the student’s family.

The case received national attention and contributed to increased public awareness of paediatric sepsis. In response, New York State enacted “Rory’s Regulations” in 2014.

== Academics ==
Garden School has Spanish, French and Mandarin as the languages on offer. There are 26 teachers and 259 students in Garden School, making it a small school with a 10:1 student to teacher ratio. Garden School offers 7 AP courses: AP Biology, AP Calculus, AP English, AP French, AP Modern European History, AP Spanish and AP US History.
