= York Preparatory School =

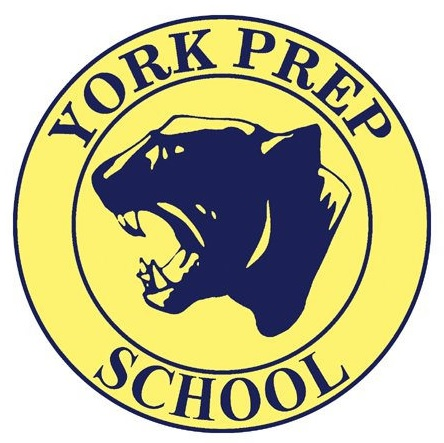

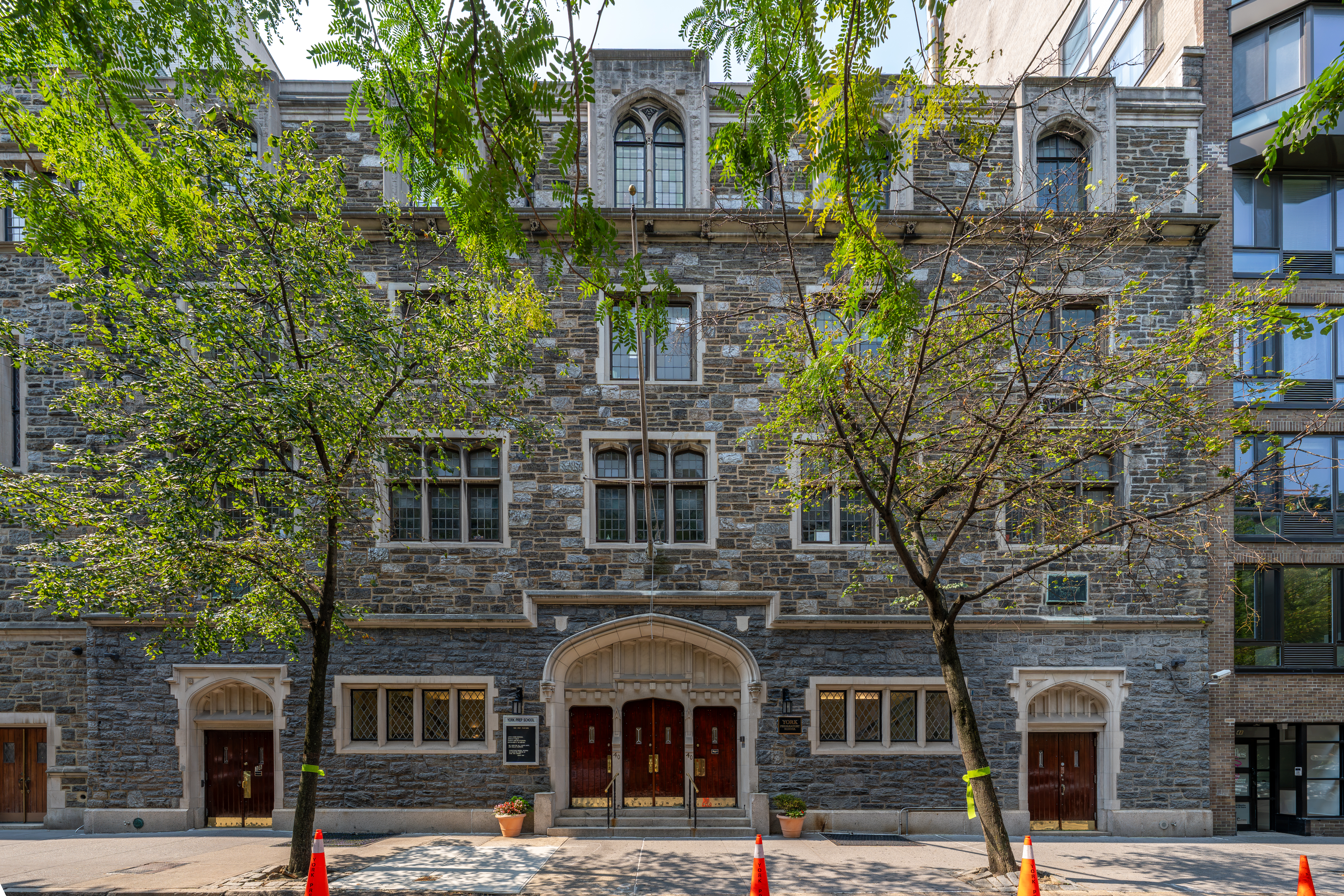

Location
- 40 West 68th Street; New York City (Manhattan), New York 10023; United States; 40°46′27″N 73°58′46″W

Information
- Type: Private, Day, College-prep, Cognita School
- Established: 1969
- Founder: Ronald Stewart and Jayme Stewart
- Head of school: Kathryn Maggiotto
- Grades: Sixth grade–12
- Gender: Coeducational
- Student to teacher ratio: 5:1
- Campus: Urban
- Colors: Blue and Yellow
- Mascot: York Prep Panthers
- Nickname: Panthers
- Accreditation: Middle States Association of Colleges and Schools
- Newspaper: The Paw
- Yearbook: The Legend
- Tuition: US$67788
- Website: yorkprep.org

York Preparatory School, commonly referred to as York Prep School, is an independent, preparatory school on the Upper West Side of Manhattan, New York City, near Lincoln Square.

The coeducational school provides instruction to approximately 350 students between 6th and 12th grades. The student:teacher ratio in 2008 was 5:1.

York Prep is approved by the New York State Board of Regents and accredited by the Middle States Association of Colleges and Schools.

== History ==
Founded and owned by Ronald and Jayme Stewart (née Spahn), York Prep opened its doors in September 1969 to 158 students in grades 6-12 and by 1972 had 212 students. Ronald Stewart served as headmaster and his wife Jayme Stewart as director of college guidance.

York is a for-profit school; Jayme Stewart's brother Stephen H. Spahn owns another for-profit school in New York City, the Dwight School.

Kate Maggiotto succeeded Mr. Stewart as the next Head of York Prep in 2023.

== Academics ==
The school uses a system called "tracking," which places students in one of several ability groups available in every subject area. This allows students to work at an advanced pace through Honors courses and the Scholars Program, in subjects in which they excel, and at a moderate pace in those subjects where they need more guidance.

York Prep offers a Jump Start Program at supplemental cost to provide assistance to students with different learning styles and learning disabilities. The program offers participants two weekly one-on-one 40 minutes sessions with their assigned Jump Start teachers, morning check-ins with their teachers, and supervised group study sessions after school.

== Facilities ==
The school, which then housed 250 students, made news in 1997 when it expanded in an unusual transaction, trading property with Ramaz School. Ramaz purchased a new building for York Prep at 68th Street and traded that for the existing school at East 85th Street.

The property at West 68th Street is the original New York home of the Hebrew Union College – Jewish Institute of Religion. The new school site—a seven-level granite building—has three science laboratories, three technology centers, a library, performance and art studios and a sprung hardwood floor gymnasium, which has a fitness center, weight room and locker room facilities.

== Notable alumni ==
- Liv Tyler, model and actress
- Yannis Pappas, comedian
- Robert E. Chambers, alumni, murderer.
- Alexis Rockman, artist
- James De La Vega, artist
- Phil Abraham, director of Mad Men
- Michael Avedon, fashion and portrait photographer
- Samia Finnerty, musician

== In news and popular culture ==
- The front of the school was featured in the film "Elf" starring Will Ferrell.
- The school and several of its students were featured in the series Ice-T's Rap School, a 6-part reality show aired on VH1 in 2006 where the rapper introduced eight of York Prep's students to rap and rap culture.
