= New York State Association of Independent Schools =

Academic organization

Coordinates: 42.653586°N 73.754782°W

- Formation: October 8, 1947
- Founder: Paul D. Shafer
- Headquarters: 17 Elk Street (First Floor); NY 12207; Albany, New York
- Executive Director: Vince Watchorn
- Website: nysais.org

The New York State Association of Independent Schools (NYSAIS) is an association of 200 independent schools and organizations, ranging from nurseries to high schools, in New York State. Founded in 1947, NYSAIS is the second-largest state association of independent schools in the United States. As of July 1, 2025 its member schools enrolled approximately 80,000 students. It was established "to protect independent schools from obstructive legislation and regulation". NYSAIS accredits member schools, provides professional development, and works with community leaders to support the needs and interests of independent schools throughout the state. NYSAIS is a member of the National Association of Independent Schools (NAIS) as well the International Council Advancing Independent School Accreditation (ICAISA).

== Governing body and administration ==
The New York State Association of Independent Schools is governed by a board of trustees. In 2025-2026, the President of the NYSAIS Board of Trustees is Phil Kassen, Director at Little Red School House & Elisabeth Irwin High School, New York, NY. Vince Watchorn has been Executive Director of NYSAIS since 2022.

== History ==
=== Early years and incorporation ===
On April 17, 1947, Paul D. Shafer, President of the Packer Collegiate Institute in Brooklyn sent out a letter to ten colleagues at other New York independent schools to discuss the founding of an association for New York independent schools. Those who received the letter were;

- Dr. Joseph Allen (Poly Prep Country Day School in Brooklyn)
- Mr. Harold C. Amos (Adelphi Academy in Brooklyn)
- Mr. Philip M. B. Babcock (Nichols School in Buffalo)
- Mr. Charles W. Bradlee (Pebble Hill School in DeWitt)
- Dr. Howard I. Dillingham (The Manlius School in Manlius)
- Dr. Frank Hackett (Riverdale Country School in Riverdale-on-Hudson)
- Mrs. Harold S. Osborne (Spence School in NYC)
- Mr. Wilson Parkhill (Collegiate School in NYC)
- Mr. Morton Snyder (Rye Country Day School in Rye)
- Miss Anne Wellington (Emma Willard School in Troy)

The New York State Association of Independent Schools held its first official meeting on October 8, 1947, at the Albany Academies. At the meeting on October 8, 1947, it was moved by Mr. Bradlee and seconded by Mr. Amos that they "set up the nucleus of a State organization (and) that the name be the New York State Association of Independent Schools (whose) membership...shall be limited to those elementary and secondary schools organized under a State charter as non-profit institutions."

The first Annual Meeting of NYSAIS was held on January 18, 1949, at the Emma Willard School in Troy. The first officers were Paul Shafer (President), Anne Wellington (Vice-President), and Harry E. P. Meislahn (Secretary-Treasurer). The first guest at a NYSAIS meeting was Dr. Henry V. Gilson, New York's Associate Commissioner of Education.

On October 25, 1968, NYSAIS was incorporated under a provisional charter granted by the New York State Board of Regents. The provisional charter required that NYSAIS draft a constitution and that a Board of Trustees be established. This was accomplished at the 20th Annual Meeting which was held on November 12, 1968, at Schrafft's Motor Inn in Albany. At this meeting, President Walter Clark announced the appointment of the first Executive Director, Appleton A. Mason Jr., who had previously served as the Headmaster of the Lake Forest Country Day School in Lake Forest, Illinois. The first official office for NYSAIS was at Appleton Mason's home in Loudonville, New York.

=== Executive directors ===
- Appleton A. Mason Jr. (1968–76) was the first Executive Director of the New York State Association of Independent Schools. Issues during this era included accreditation, the relationship of NYSAIS with the New York State Athletic Council, the formation of the Independent Educational Services non-profit organization, financial sustainability, and the relationship between independent schools and government funding.
- Stephen Hinrichs (1976–86) served as the second Executive Director. He was previously headmaster at The Harley School in Rochester. During Hinrichs' tenure, it was recognized that there was merit in holding a single evaluation for an entire school rather than a NYSAIS evaluation of the elementary school and a Middle States Association evaluation of the secondary level. In 1981 the NYSAIS offices were moved to Canandaigua.
- Frederick Calder (1986-2007). Formerly headmaster of Germantown Friends School, in 1987, Calder announced that the NYSAIS office would be moved to the campus of the Emma Willard School in Troy.
- Elizabeth "Penney" Riegelman (2007–09) was Executive Director from July 1, 2007 until June 30, 2009. Riegelman had been the Head of School at the Newark Academy in Livingston, New Jersey. Under Riegelman's leadership the NYSAIS Charter was amended to include the accreditation of preschools.
- Mark W. Lauria (2009–2022). Previously head of school at Foothill Country Day School in Claremont, Lauria was appointed in 2009. During his tenure, the growing role of technology in NYSAIS member schools was a change. In 2011, NYSAIS Operations Inc., which would become a 501(c)(6) nonprofit organization, was formed. During his tenure, the NYSAIS offices were moved from Schenectady to Albany and annual Regional Meetings were established.

== Membership ==
NYSAIS has four membership categories:

- Full: An independent nursery/kindergarten, elementary or secondary school incorporated as a 501(c)(3) not-for-profit corporation that has served as a provisional member prior to becoming a full member. Prior to becoming a full member, the school must have been operating for at least five years, adhere to NYSAIS criteria of non-discrimination in hiring and admissions, and be accredited by the NYSAIS Commission on Accreditation.
- Provisional: An independent nursery/kindergarten, elementary or secondary school elected as such by the board of trustees and incorporated as a 501(c)(3) not-for-profit corporation, able to meet the standards for full membership and accreditation within five years.
- Associate: An independent educational organization that is not an incorporated not-for-profit, whose standards are neither accredited nor endorsed by NYSAIS, but is located in the State of New York and is accredited by an accrediting body acceptable to the NYSAIS Trustees.
- Organization: A nonprofit organization concerned with independent school education elected as such by the NYSAIS Board of Trustees. Organization members are not entitled to vote and are not provided with legislative services.

== Accreditation ==
According to the NYSAIS Charter, issued on February 25, 1984, the association has "authority to evaluate and accredit schools in the State of New York (which) is conferred by charter from the Regents of the University of New York." All good schools continually evaluate their performance by means of their own devising, but the view a school takes of itself needs periodically to be supplemented by an external view, one that brings a perspective the school cannot command.

Formal evaluation combines self-scrutiny with external review by a committee of peers, both processes being guided by the NYSAIS Manual for Evaluation and Accreditation. "The Manual gives structure, direction, and scope to the undertaking that goes beyond that which a school might ordinarily elect. The external review brings observations, comments, and suggestions possible only for those who are not immersed in the daily concerns of a school’s life."

The object of evaluation is to assist the school to better realize its objectives, to support rather than to inspect and to enhance the school's unique character rather than to impose a common design. Thus, a school is evaluated in terms of its own purposes and objectives, not those of some remote authority.

The accreditation of the NYSAIS schools is overseen by the NYSAIS Commission on Accreditation, chaired by Bart Baldwin (St. Luke's School). The past chairs were Kate Turley (City and Country School) and William G. Morris Jr. (Friends Academy). The NYSAIS Associate Directors who oversee NYSAIS Accreditation are Shannon Rogers and George Swain.

NYSAIS is a founding member of the International Council Advancing Independent School Accreditation (ICAISA).

== Professional learning ==
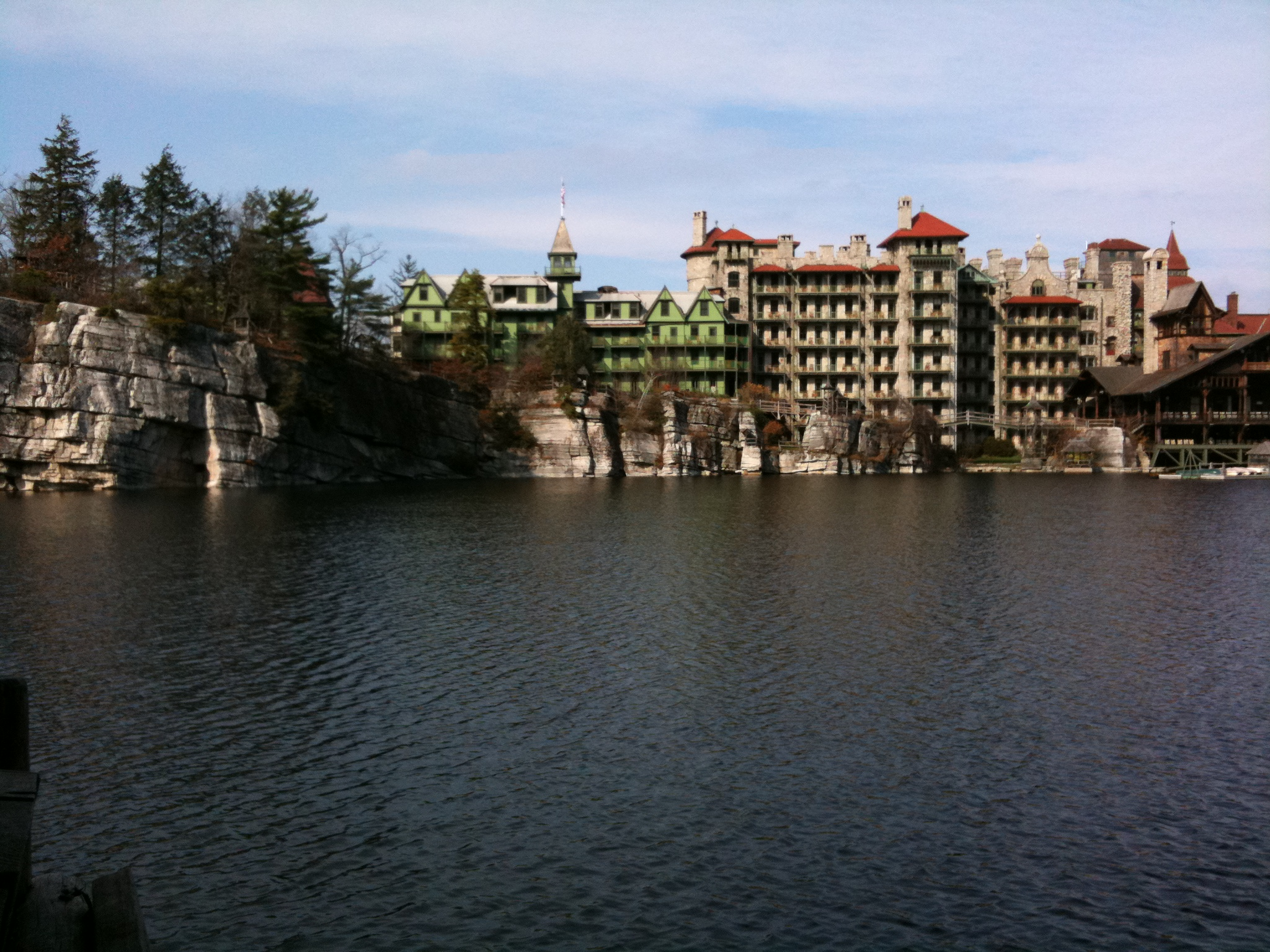
Mohonk Mountain House

NYSAIS organizes conferences, workshops, and residential institutes for teachers, school heads, trustees, assistant and division heads, business and financial managers, and administrators. Most of the residential conferences are held at Mohonk Mountain House in New Paltz.

NYSAIS professional learning includes approximately 95 multi-day residential conferences and day-long workshops. Some are collaborative efforts with neighboring state associations of independent schools.

== Emerging Leaders Institute ==
In 2010, participants at the NYSAIS Think Tank identified the need to create a professional development program for emerging leaders in NYSAIS schools. In 2011, NYSAIS launched the NYSAIS Emerging Leaders Institute (ELI) with 16 cohort members. For the sixth cohort group (2021-2023) the program will be directed by Eric Osorio and Jessica Romero. The current cohort includes participants from a diverse range of backgrounds and independent schools across New York State. Admission to the 2-year program is competitive and must include the strong endorsement of one's current Head of School.

== Athletic association ==
Under the NYSAIS umbrella, the New York State Association of Independent Schools Athletic Association (NYSAISAA) is a sports league for independent schools in New York State. It is overseen by the Athletic Executive Committee (AEC) as well as the NYSAIS Board of Trustees.

== Bibliography ==
- Independent by Design: A History of the New York State Association of Independent Schools, Dane L. Peters, 2014 (ISBN 978-0-578-14542-6)
- Design for Independence, Inspiration, and Innovation: The New York State Association of Independent Schools at 7 0, Dane L. Peters, 2017 (ISBN 978-0-692-906439)
