= Howard Washington =

American-Canadian basketball player (born 1998)

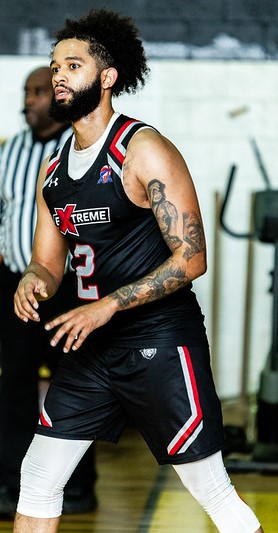

Personal information
- Born: March 24, 1998 (age 28) Buffalo, New York, US
- Listed height: 6 ft 3 in (1.91 m)
- Listed weight: 167 lb (76 kg)

Career information
- High school: Canisius High School (2012–2014); Montverde Academy (2014–2016); Athlete Institute (2016–2017)
- College: Syracuse (2017–2020)
- NBA draft: 2022: undrafted
- Playing career: 2017–present
- Position: Shooting guard

Career history

Playing
- 2023–2025: Buffalo eXtreme

Coaching
- 2022–present: Bishop Timon – St. Jude (assistant)
- 2025–present: City Rocks AAU

Career highlights
- All-ABA Second Team (2025); All-ABA Honorable Mention (2024); ACC Bob Bradley Spirit and Courage Award (2020); Dick's High School National Champion (2015); MMAA Player of the Year (2014)

Howard Washington Jr. (born March 24, 1998) is an American-Canadian professional basketball player who last played for the Buffalo eXtreme of the American Basketball Association (ABA). He played college basketball for the Syracuse Orange.

Washington is currently assistant coach for Bishop Timon – St. Jude High School. He is also head coach of the City Rocks AAU team in Albany, New York.

== Early life ==
Washington was born in Buffalo, New York to mother Kacey Washington, a Canadian, and father Howard Washington Sr. Because of his mother's heritage, Washington claims American and Canadian dual citizenship under jus sanguinis.

== High school career ==
He initially played basketball at Canisius High School in Buffalo, where in his sophomore season he was named Monsignor Martin Athletic Association Player of the Year.

He transferred to Montverde Academy in Florida for his junior and senior year, where he helped Montverde defeat Oak Hill Academy 70–61 to win the 2015 Dick's Sporting Goods High School National Championship.

Washington then spent a year at the Athlete Institute in Mono, Ontario. Washington participated in the 2017 BioSteel All-Canadian Basketball Game, where he won the Three-Point Contest.

== College career ==
He committed to Syracuse in March 2017 after initially committing to Butler.

While at practice for his freshman 2017–18 season, Washington suffered an ACL tear and a partially torn MCL. During his recovery, he suffered a stroke in September 2018 as a result of an undiagnosed patent foramen ovale. After emergency surgery, Washington returned to play just 33 days later. He was granted a medical redshirt exemption for the remainder of the 2018–19 season, but continued practicing with the team. For his perseverance, Washington received the 2020 ACC Bob Bradley Spirit and Courage Award.

Frustrated with his lack of playing time during the 2019–20 season, Washington entered the transfer portal in March 2020. He transferred to South Alabama in September 2020, intending to play at the school as a fourth-year junior. Later that same year, he opted out of playing for the 2020–2021 season.

== Professional career ==
In October 2023, Washington signed with the Buffalo eXtreme of the American Basketball Association. He received an All-ABA honorable mention after leading the team in assists during the 2023–24 season. After once again leading the team in assists during their 2024–25 season, Washington was named to the All-ABA Second Team.

== National team career ==
Washington represented Canada at the 2014 FIBA Under-17 World Championship. Canada went 4–3 in the tournament and finished sixth place overall, with Washington's 41.4 percent 3-point shooting ranking him fourth among all players.

== Coaching career ==
Washington has been assistant coach for Bishop Timon – St. Jude High School under Jason Rowe. They reached the CHSAA Championship Game in March 2023, losing to Monsignor Farrell High School. In March 2024 they again played in the CHSAA Championship Game, losing to Chaminade High School.

He was hired as head coach of the City Rocks AAU team of Albany, New York in April 2025.

== Career statistics ==
Legend
GP	Games played	GS	Games started	MPG	Minutes per game
FG%	Field goal percentage	3P%	3-point field goal percentage	FT%	Free throw percentage
RPG	Rebounds per game	APG	Assists per game	SPG	Steals per game
BPG	Blocks per game	PPG	Points per game	**Bold**	Career high

=== ABA ===
==== Regular season ====
Year	Team	GP	GS	MPG	FG%	3P%	FT%	RPG	APG	SPG	BPG	PPG
2023–24	Buffalo	**17**	**17**	–	**.440**	**.430**	**.800**	5.6	**9.4**	**1.8**	**0.3**	18.5
2024–25	Buffalo	15	15	–	.340	**.430**	.770	**7.3**	8.3	1.2	0.2	**19.7**
Career		32	32	–	.390	.430	.785	6.5	8.9	1.5	0.3	19.1

=== College ===
Year	Team	GP	GS	MPG	FG%	3P%	FT%	RPG	APG	SPG	BPG	PPG
2017–18	Syracuse	18	0	6.1	**.294**	**.167**	.700	0.83	0.56	0.33	**0.06**	1.06
2018–19	Syracuse	3	0	3.3	.000	.000	.000	**1.33**	0.33	0.00	0.00	0.00
2019–20	Syracuse	**20**	0	**7.4**	.269	.154	**1.000**	0.85	**1.20**	**0.40**	0.00	**1.15**
Career		41	0	6.5	.273	.154	.824	0.88	0.85	0.34	0.02	1.02
