= Bob Bateson =

American football player (born 1961)

No. 45
- Position: Linebacker

Personal information
- Born: May 14, 1961 (age 65); Chicago, Illinois, U.S.
- Listed height: 6 ft 1 in (1.85 m)
- Listed weight: 220 lb (100 kg)

Career information
- High school: Eden Central (Eden, New York)
- College: SUNY Cortland
- NFL draft: 1983: undrafted

Career history
- As player: Hamilton Tiger-Cats (1984); Buffalo Bills (1985)*; Seahawks Bellusco (1986–1988); As strength and conditioning coach: Buffalo Rapids (2005–2006); Buffalo Stampede (2008); Nigeria (2019); As assistant coach: The Park School of Buffalo (2017–2021); Buffalo eXtreme (2023–2025)
- * Offseason or practice squad member only

Awards and highlights
- As player: SUNY Cortland C-Club Hall of Fame (2023); All-ECAC Team (1982); NYSPHSAA Section VI All-Star (1978); As assistant coach: 2× CHSAA Class A champion (2018, 2019); New York State Class A champion (2018)

Robert S. Bateson Jr. (born May 14, 1961) is an American former football linebacker who played for SUNY Cortland, and later professionally for the Hamilton Tiger-Cats and Seahawks Bellusco in Italy.

He became a personal trainer and strength and conditioning coach after retiring, and was associate head coach for The Park School of Buffalo and the Buffalo eXtreme.

== Early life ==
Robert S. Bateson Jr. was born on May 14, 1961 in Chicago, Illinois, the son of Genevieve (née Kruk) and Robert S. Bateson Sr who worked in the finance sector.

His family moved to Columbus, Ohio in 1974, and later to Eden, New York in 1977. Bateson played linebacker at Eden Central High School, and was named to the NYSPHSAA Section VI All-Star team as a senior in 1978.

== Playing career ==
Bateson was originally recruited to play collegiate football at Kent State University, but couldn't afford the tuition after they only offered him a partial scholarship.

He was a four-year starter for SUNY Cortland, captaining the team in 1982 when he set the school's single-season record for tackles with 140, and the single-game record for tackles with 23. Bateson was named to the 1982 All-ECAC Team following his senior campaign. He graduated in 1983 with a BS in physical education, concentrated in sports medicine.

After his senior year at SUNY Cortland, he received tryouts with United States Football League teams including the Chicago Blitz, New Jersey Generals and Pittsburgh Maulers. He played professionally for the Hamilton Tiger-Cats of the Canadian Football League in 1984. Bateson was signed by the Buffalo Bills of the National Football League as a free agent in 1985, but released due to a knee injury. He finished his playing career in Italy, competing for Seahawks Bellusco in the Italian Football League from 1986 to 1988.

== Coaching career ==
Bateson founded the health club Body Blocks Fitness in 1988, located in downtown Buffalo. He has served as personal trainer for professional athletes including Dave Hollins.

He was strength and conditioning coach under Richard Jacob for the Buffalo Rapids of the American Basketball Association from 2005 to 2006, and later for the Buffalo Stampede of the Premier Basketball League in 2008. Bateson was hired by the Buffalo Bills to run informal team workouts during the 2011 NFL lockout. He served as strength and conditioning coach for the Nigeria men's national basketball team under Alexander Nwora at the 2019 FIBA Basketball World Cup.

Bateson served as associate head coach of The Park School of Buffalo under Richard Jacob from 2017 to 2021, where they won the 2018 New York State Class A championship.

He was associate head coach of the Buffalo eXtreme under Richard Jacob from 2023 to 2025.

== Personal life ==
Bateson and his wife Paula own and operate RPB Holdings, a property management company.

He was inducted into the SUNY Cortland Athletics C-Club Hall of Fame in 2023.
