= Athlete Institute =

Athletic centre in Ontario, Canada

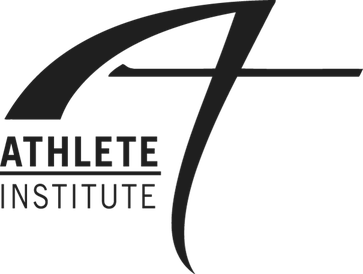
- Interactive map of Athlete Institute
- Location: 207321 Highway 9, Mono, Ontario, Canada; L9W 6J2
- Coordinates: 43.93210°N 80.04312°W
- Owner: Jesse Tipping
- Operator: Jesse Tipping

Construction
- Opened: September 2010

Tenants
- Orangeville A's (NBLC) (2015–2017); Athlete Institute Prep (Ontario Scholastic Basketball Association) (2012–present); Orangeville Prep (Ontario Scholastic Basketball Association) (2010–present); Athlete Institute Red (Ontario Scholastic Basketball Association) (2018–present); Athlete Institute Black (Ontario Scholastic Basketball Association) (2018–present)

The Athlete Institute is an athletic centre located in Mono, Ontario. It is made up of three facilities, the training centre, residence and the fieldhouse. The Institute is home to The Orangeville Prep Basketball Academy, who compete in the Ontario Scholastic Basketball Association (OSBA). Orangeville District Secondary School provides academic instruction for the institute's students. As well as home to By Design Learning Centre, CrossFit Orangeville, Purple Owl Pilates and Athlete Institute Football Club. (AIFC) It was formerly home to the Orangeville A's of the National Basketball League of Canada (NBLC).

== History ==
The institute was founded in September 2010 by colleagues Jesse Tipping and Adam Hoffman. Tipping followed the dreams of his father, James, who wanted to create the best basketball facility in Canada. Tipping would later compete with the Brampton A's, an NBL Canada team owned by his family, which had grown rich through the trucking industry. The A's relocated to Orangeville and claimed the Athlete Institute as their home arena.

The Athlete Institute has received praise from several players, including local high school basketball player Jalen Poyser, who said, "I thought it was like an NBA facility when I got here." The Toronto Star credited the institute for attracting top talent from around the world. The newspaper also considered Tipping as one of the "five most important people in Canadian basketball."

In September 2014, the institute received significant exposure when highly touted 2016 NBA draft prospect Thon Maker joined the program; he went on to become the first high schooler to be taken in the first round of an NBA draft since 2005.

== Orangeville Prep ==
Orangeville Prep is the national team at Athlete Institute. They compete in The Grind Session in addition as the Ontario Scholastic Basketball Association (OSBA). In the 2019-20 OSBA season, Orangeville Prep won the championship, and had a 19–0 record in the regular season.

The team and the school are the subject of the 2021 CBC Television documentary series Anyone's Game.

2020-21 Orangeville Prep Roster
Number	Position	Name	Height	Grad Year	Hometown	Post-Secondary Commitment
0	PG	Jalik Dunkley-Distant	6'3	2024	Stoney Creek, Ontario	
1	PG	Darius DeAveiro	5'11	2021	Ottawa, Ontario	Valparaiso
2	SG	Justice Gordon	6'4	2022	Milton, Ontario	Wayne State
3	SF	Khenyan Stirling	6'5	2022	Toronto, Ontario	Toronto Metropolitan
4	PG	Jefferson Monegro	6'4	2022	LaSalle, Quebec	Western Michigan
5	SF	Enoch Kalambay	6'7	2022	Gatineau, Quebec	Tallahassee CC
6	G	Wilson Dubinsky	6'2	2021	Ottawa, Ontario	Seward County CC
8	SF	Justin Chase	6'6	2023	Toronto, Ontario	UNB
10	G	Jahnai Dunkley-Distant	6'5	2024	Stoney Creek, Ontario	
11	SF	Majambu Mbikay	6'8	2022	Châteauguay, Quebec	Florida Southwestern CC
12	G	Aaron Aboonabi	6'2	2023	Guelph, Ontario	
13	G	Jayden Samarasekera	6'0	2023	Hong Kong	
15	PF	Rory Stewart	6'9	2022	London, United Kingdom	Rhode Island
21	G	Izan Rooke Mora	6'0	2024	Madrid, Spain	
24	C	Mustafo Vanjov	7'0	2022	Tajikistan	Curry College
25	G	Alberto Menendez	6'2	2022	Waterloo, Ontario	
30	G	Tristan Louka	6'1	2023	Richmond Hill, Ontario	
33	G	Jonathan Gaspard	5'11	2024	Nepean, Ontario	
35	G	Nishaan Singh	5'11	2025	Oakville, Ontario	
-	Head coach	Tony McIntyre				
-	Assistant coach	Olivier Jean-Charles				
-	Assistant coach	John Sedore				
-	Assistant coach	Koven Padayachee				
-	Strength & conditioning coach	Tyler Schneider				

== Notable alumni ==
- Kyle Alexander (born 1996), basketball player for Hapoel Tel Aviv of the Israeli Basketball Premier League
- Ignas Brazdeikis, professional basketball player for Olympiacos
- Oshae Brissett (born 1998), professional basketball player for Maccabi Tel Aviv; formerly played in the NBA; former NBA champion
- Luguentz Dort (born 1999), professional basketball player for the Oklahoma City Thunder
- Matur Maker, professional basketball player for the Central Coast Crusaders
- Thon Maker, professional basketball player for the Fujian Sturgeons
- Jamal Murray (born 1997), professional basketball player for the Denver Nuggets
- Howard Washington, professional basketball player for the Buffalo eXtreme
