= Canisius High School =

Private school in Buffalo, New York, United States

Location
- 1180 Delaware Avenue; Buffalo, Erie County, New York 14209; United States; 42°54′59″N 78°52′11″W

Information
- School type: Private, college-preparatory school
- Motto: Latin: Ad Majorem Dei Gloriam (For the greater glory of God)
- Religious affiliation: Catholic (Jesuit)
- Patron saint: St. Peter Canisius, S.J.
- Established: 1870; 156 years ago
- Founder: Society of Jesus
- CEEB code: 331000
- President: Rev. David S. Ciancimino, SJ
- Principal: Thomas Coppola
- Teaching staff: 61.6 (FTE) (2017-18)
- Grades: 9 to 12
- Gender: All-male
- Enrollment: 630 (2025-26)
- Student to teacher ratio: 12:1 (2025-26)
- Campus: Urban
- Colors: Navy blue and Vegas gold
- Slogan: Men for Others
- Athletics conference: Monsignor Martin Athletic Association
- Sports: List: baseball; basketball; football; volleyball; bowling; crew; cross country; golf; hockey; lacrosse; sailing; squash; soccer; swimming; tennis; track and field; rugby; wrestling
- Mascot: Carl the Crusader
- Nickname: CHS
- Team name: Crusaders
- Rival: St. Joseph's Collegiate Institute
- Accreditation: Middle States Association of Colleges and Schools
- Yearbook: Arena
- Tuition: $18,170 (2025-26)
- Website: www.canisiushigh.org

Canisius High School is a Catholic, Jesuit, private college-preparatory school for boys in grades 9 through 12 in Buffalo, New York, United States. Founded in 1870, the school is named for Peter Canisius and has historical ties to Canisius College. Canisius is a member of the Jesuit Schools Network and the New York State Association of Independent Schools.

== History ==
In 1850, a group of Jesuits left Europe in response to Bishop John Timon's call for a Catholic institution to serve European immigrants settling in Western New York. The Jesuits founded Buffalo's first Catholic college and named it after St. Peter Canisius, a 16th-century Jesuit theologian, scholar, evangelist, and educator.

Canisius High School was opened next to St. Michael's Church in September 1870 as part of Canisius College. It moved to Washington Street in 1872. In 1912 there were 379 students. In 1919, Fr. Robert Johnson was named as the first rector. The school was chartered separately from the college in September 1928.

== Campus ==
Located at 1180 Delaware Avenue just north of the Delaware Avenue Historic District, the Canisius site is among many architecturally and historically significant residences in the area. The school sits just south of Gates Circle, with tree-lined parkways designed and built by Frederick Law Olmsted and Calvert Vaux leading to Delaware Park. Canisius is also located just east of the Elmwood Village, which was named one of "10 Great Neighborhoods in America" by the American Planning Association.

The present-day Koessler Academic Center, also known as Berchmans' Hall, was originally built as a private residence for George F. Rand, Sr., founder and former president of Marine Midland Bank. Canisius identifies the building as the former George Rand mansion, designed by William and Franklyn Kidd and constructed from 1918 to 1921.

The building was sold in 1924 to the Masons, who converted it into the Buffalo Masonic Consistory. The Masonic period added major facilities, including the auditorium. Canisius describes the auditorium as a 1920s neo-classical space with Tiffany stained glass that is used for school assemblies, theater productions, and graduation events.

The Jesuits purchased the former Masonic Consistory in 1944 and unified the high school at the Delaware Avenue campus in 1948. A Jesuit residence, Frauenheim Hall, was later added to the northwest side of the building. In 1957, the adjacent Milburn House, site of the death of President William McKinley, was demolished to make way for a parking lot. It had been an apartment building since 1919 but had fallen into poor condition by the time of its demolition.

In November 2007, the school unveiled a $14 million plan to upgrade its campus. Frauenheim Hall was demolished and replaced by the Bernard J. Kennedy Field House, which opened in 2009 and has seating for up to 1,000 spectators. A new Math and Science center, the Montante Academic Wing, stands connected to the Beecher Classroom Wing, adjoining West Ferry Street. In 2008, the Robert J. Stransky Memorial Athletic Complex opened in the suburb of West Seneca.

The campus has continued to expand in the 21st century. In May 2017, the school acquired the Conners Mansion, located next to the main campus on the opposite side of West Ferry Street. Canisius opened the Center for Arts in the former Conners Mansion in January 2018. At the West Seneca athletic complex, the school opened the Coppola Family Field baseball facility in 2023 and a new junior varsity baseball field in 2024. The Madden Center for Global Learning opened in spring 2024.

== Student body ==
As of the 2025-26 school year, Canisius enrolled 630 male students in grades 9 through 12 and reported a student-teacher ratio of 12:1. The school uses a house system with six houses named for prominent Jesuits: Arrupe, Campion, Gonzaga, Jogues, Loyola, and Xavier. The Class of 2009 produced 3 National Merit Finalists and 13 National Merit Commended Students, more than any other private high school in Western New York.

== Athletics ==
Canisius competes in the Monsignor Martin Athletic Association. The Crusaders field teams in baseball, basketball, bowling, crew, cross country, football, golf, hockey, lacrosse, sailing, squash, soccer, swimming, tennis, track and field, volleyball, rugby, and wrestling.

In 2013, Rivals profiled the Canisius football program and its recruiting visibility. The school's traditional athletic rival is St. Joseph's Collegiate Institute. Contests between the two institutions have received local media coverage.

== Curriculum ==
Canisius requires students to enroll in at least seven courses each academic year and to complete 30 credits for a diploma. The school's published diploma requirements exceed those established by the New York Board of Regents, and Canisius does not participate in New York State Regents examinations. Students are required to complete 100 service hours during their four years at the school. Canisius describes its academic program as a college-preparatory liberal arts curriculum rooted in the Jesuit tradition.

== Notable alumni ==
- Ansley B. Borkowski 1916, former New York State Assembly member and assembly clerk (1936-1964)
- Stan Bowman 1991, National Hockey League executive and general manager and executive vice president of hockey operations for the Edmonton Oilers
- Most Rev. Joseph A. Burke 1905, Bishop of Buffalo from 1952 to 1962
- Steven Coppola 2002, 2008 Olympic rower
- John W. Cudmore, 1954, surgeon and US Army major general
- Jim Cunningham 1954, standout basketball player at Fordham University
- John Curtin 1939, former US Attorney and US District Court Judge
- Charles S. Desmond 1913, Chief Judge of the New York Court of Appeals from 1960 to 1966
- Darren Fenn 1997, professional basketball player and owner of the Buffalo eXtreme
- Larry Felser 1951, former columnist for The Buffalo News and youngest recipient of the Dick McCann Memorial Award
- Tom Fontana 1969, TV writer and producer, Oz, The Jury and Homicide: Life on the Street
- Ed Don George 1924, 1928 Olympic wrestler and member of the Professional Wrestling Hall of Fame
- Mark Giangreco 1970, sportscaster
- John M. Granville 1993, United States Agency for International Development diplomat assassinated in Sudan
- Nick Grunzweig 1938, professional basketball player
- John J. LaFalce 1957, United States Congressman from 1975 to 2003
- Richard D. (Max) McCarthy 1945, member of the U.S. House of Representatives from New York's 39th congressional district from 1965 to 1971
- Phil McConkey 1975, former New York Giants wide receiver
- Donald Monan, S.J., 1942, former chancellor and president of Boston College
- Most Rev. Martin Neylon, S.J., 1937, Bishop of the Caroline Islands from 1971 to 1995
- Qadree Ollison 2014, professional football running back selected by the Atlanta Falcons in the 2019 NFL draft
- Rev. William O'Malley, S.J., 1949, first Catholic priest to portray a priest in a commercial motion picture
- Thomas Perez 1979, former United States Secretary of Labor, former chairman of the Democratic National Committee, and former senior advisor to President Joe Biden and director of the White House Office of Intergovernmental Affairs
- Donald Pinkel 1944, medical doctor, pioneer in pediatric hematology and oncology, founding medical director and CEO of St. Jude Children's Research Hospital
- Larry Quinn 1970, former minority owner and president of the Buffalo Sabres
- Kyle Roche 2005, attorney
- Edwin J. Roland 1923, Commandant of the United States Coast Guard from 1962 to 1966
- Martin E. "Valerian Ruminski" Ruminski 1985, Metropolitan Opera singer
- Mark Russell 1950, comedian, pianist, and singer
- Tim Russert 1968, journalist, former host of NBC's Meet the Press
- Joseph Sansonese 1964, author and screenwriter
- Sibby Sisti 1938, former Major League Baseball player and 1946 Minor League Player of the Year
- B. John Tutuska 1930, former Sheriff of Erie County and the second County Executive of Erie County
- John Urschel 2009, William V. Campbell Trophy winner, 2014 NFL draft draft pick by the Baltimore Ravens, and assistant professor of mathematics at the Massachusetts Institute of Technology
- Lawrence J. Vilardo 1973, United States District Judge of the United States District Court for the Western District of New York
- Roy Vongtama 1992, oncologist and actor
