= Johnathan =

Johnathan is a given name. It is an alternative spelling of Jonathan, or a portmanteau with the etymologically unrelated name John. Notable people with the name include:

== American football ==
- Johnathan Abram (born 1996), American football safety
- Johnathan Baldwin (born 2003), American football safety
- Johnathan Gray (born 1993), American football running back
- Johnathan Hankins (born 1992), American football defensive tackle
- Johnathan Joseph (born 1984), American football cornerback
- Johnathan Taylor (born 1979), American football defensive end

== Soccer ==
- Johnathan Aparecido da Silva (born 1990), Brazilian football player
- Johnathan Carlos Pereira (born 1995), Brazilian footballer

== Basketball ==
- Johnathan Ivy (born 1992), American basketball player for Buffalo eXtreme of the American Basketball Association
- Johnathan Loyd (born 1991), American professional basketball player
- Johnathan Motley (born 1995), American basketball player for Hapoel Tel Aviv of the Israeli Basketball Premier League
- Johnathan Stove (born 1995), American basketball player for Hapoel Galil Elyon of the Israeli Basketball Premier League
- Johnathan Williams (born 1995), American college basketball player

== Other ==
- Johnathan Duncan, American politician and Kansas City, Missouri, city council member
- Johnathan Kovacevic (born 1997), Canadian professional ice hockey player
- Johnathan Porter (born 1997), American rapper known professionally as Blueface
- Johnathan Rodríguez (born 1999), Puerto Rican professional baseball player
- Johnathan Thurston (born 1983), Australian professional rugby league footballer
- Johnathan Wendel (born 1981), American former professional esports player
