= Jonathon =

Jonathon is a male given name. It is an often used alternative spelling of "Jonathan", as is "Johnathan". Notable people named Jonathon include:

- Jon Allen (musician) (born 1977), English singer-songwriter
- Jonathon Brandmeier (born 1956), a Chicago radio personality and musician
- Jonathon Morris (born 1960), English actor and former television presenter
- Jonathon Simmons (born 1989), American professional basketball player
- Jonathon Ross (footballer) (born 1973), Australian rules footballer
- Jonathon Young (born 1973), Canadian actor
- Jonathon Porritt (born 1950), a leading British environmentalist and writer
- Jonathon Blum (born 1989), American professional ice hockey defenseman, currently playing with HC Sochi of the Kontinental Hockey
- Jonathon Webb (born 1983), Australian professional racing driver and team owner of Tekno Autosports
