= Monroe Community College =

Public college in Monroe County, New York, US

Monroe Community College, State University of New York
- Motto: Inspiring every day.
- Type: Public community college
- Established: 1961; 65 years ago
- Parent institution: State University of New York
- Endowment: $21.8 million (2025)
- President: Deanna R. Burt-Nanna
- Undergraduates: 9,143 (fall 2025)
- Location: Brighton, New York, U.S. 43.1019°N 77.6144°W
- Campus: Suburban, 300 acres (120 ha)
- Colors: Gold & black
- Nickname: Tribunes
- Sporting affiliations: National Junior College Athletic Association, Region III
- Website: www.monroecc.edu

Monroe Community College (MCC) is a public community college in Monroe County, New York. It is part of the State University of New York. The college has two campuses; the main campus in the town of Brighton, and the Downtown Campus in the City of Rochester. The college also has off-site learning at the Applied Technologies Center, Monroe County Public Safety Training Facility, and offers online classes. As of 2023, MCC has enrolled more than a half a million students.

== History ==
In 1961, community leaders, led by local physician Samuel J. Stabins, established the college to prepare students to work in healthcare. That same year, MCC became part of the SUNY system, and its program offerings were expanded to prepare graduates for employment, or transfer to a four-year institution. Initially, the college was lodged in East High School located at 410 Alexander Street. The location was condemned by the city as a fire hazard, forcing the school to make renovations. On September 9, 1962, the original campus re-opened with the first class of 720 students.

In June 1965, MCC became the first college in the nation to receive accreditation within three years of its founding. Due to increasing enrollment, the college overflowed its first location's capacity. In 1968, the college moved to its main campus on East Henrietta Road in Brighton. In 1991, the college announced plans for a second campus. The Damon City Campus, named in honor of longtime Trustee E. Kent Damon, opened its doors the following year in downtown Rochester. In 2003, MCC opened the Alice Holloway Young Commons, its on-campus housing.

=== Presidents ===
Presidents of the college
Name	Title	Tenure
LeRoy V. Good	President	1961 – 1972
George A. Glasser	Interim president	1972
Moses S. Koch	President	1973 – 1981
George A. Glasser	Interim president	1981
Peter A. Spina	President	1982 – 1999
R. Thomas Flynn	Interim president President	November 1, 1999 – February 8, 2000; February 9, 2000 – August 2008
Lawrence W. "Larry" Tyree	Interim president	August 2008 – July 5, 2009
Anne M. Kress	President	July 6, 2009 – January 5, 2020
Katherine P. Douglas	Interim President	February 3, 2020 – January 4, 2021
Deanna R. Burt-Nanna	President	January 5, 2021 – present

== Campuses ==
MCC occupies two campuses: the 300-acre (120 ha) main campus on 1000 East Henrietta Road in the Town of Brighton, New York and the Downtown Campus on 321 State Street near Frontier Field and Kodak Tower. MCC also offers classes at the Applied Technologies Center on West Henrietta Road which includes automotive technologies, heating/cooling ventilation, and precision tooling and machinery. In addition, the college trains law enforcement, fire safety, and emergency medical services personnel at the county Public Safety Training Facility.

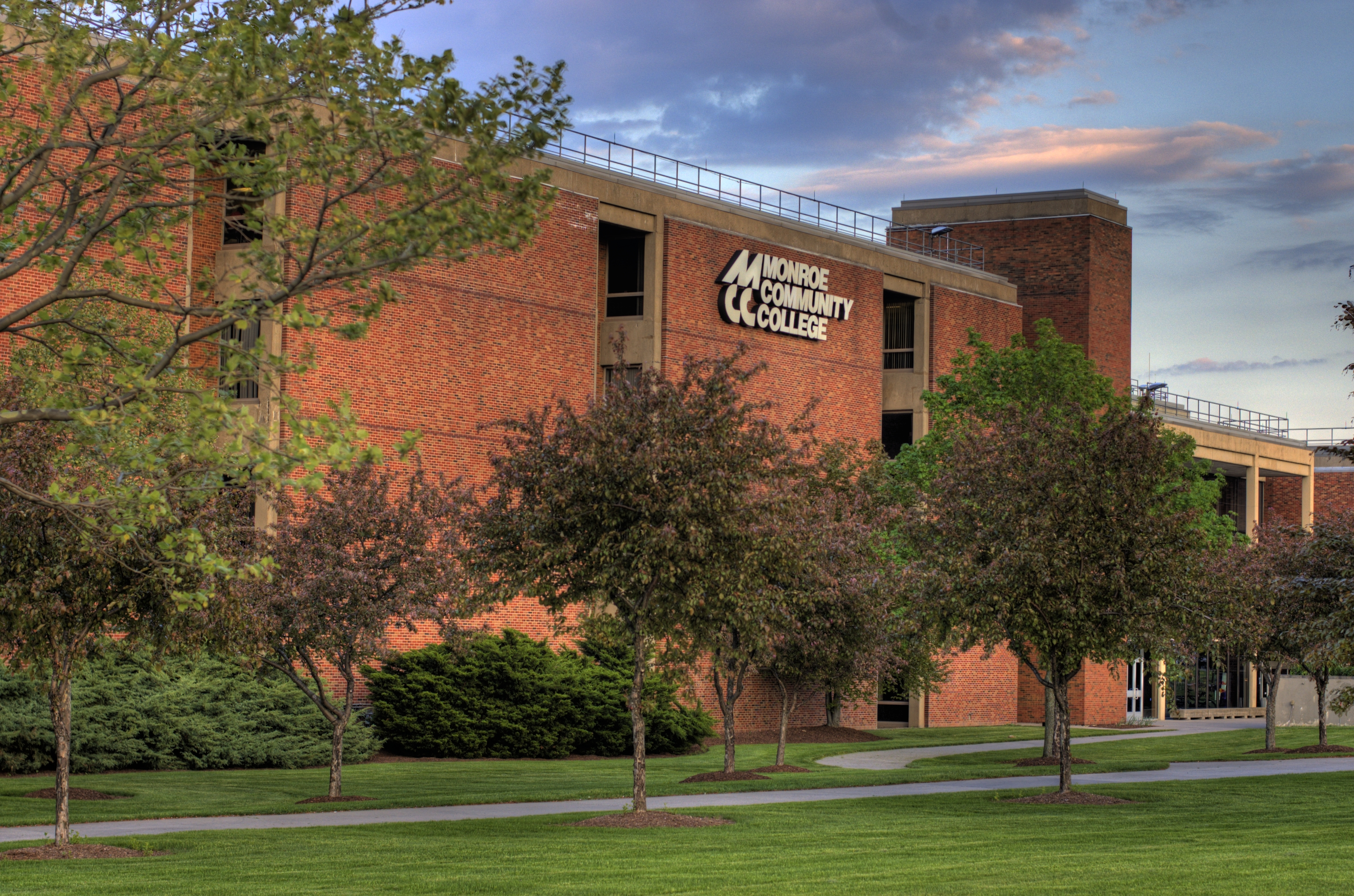
MCC Brighton Campus

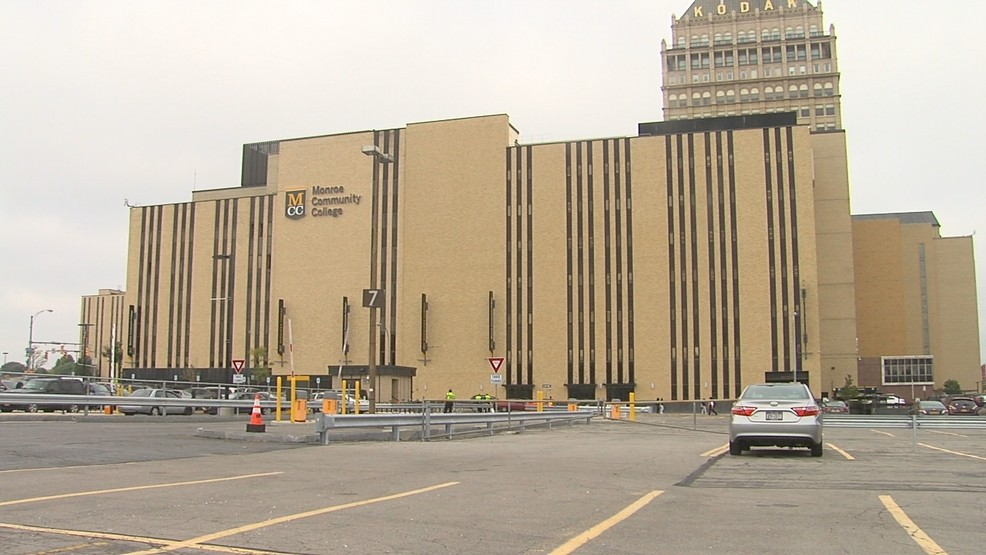
MCC Downtown Campus

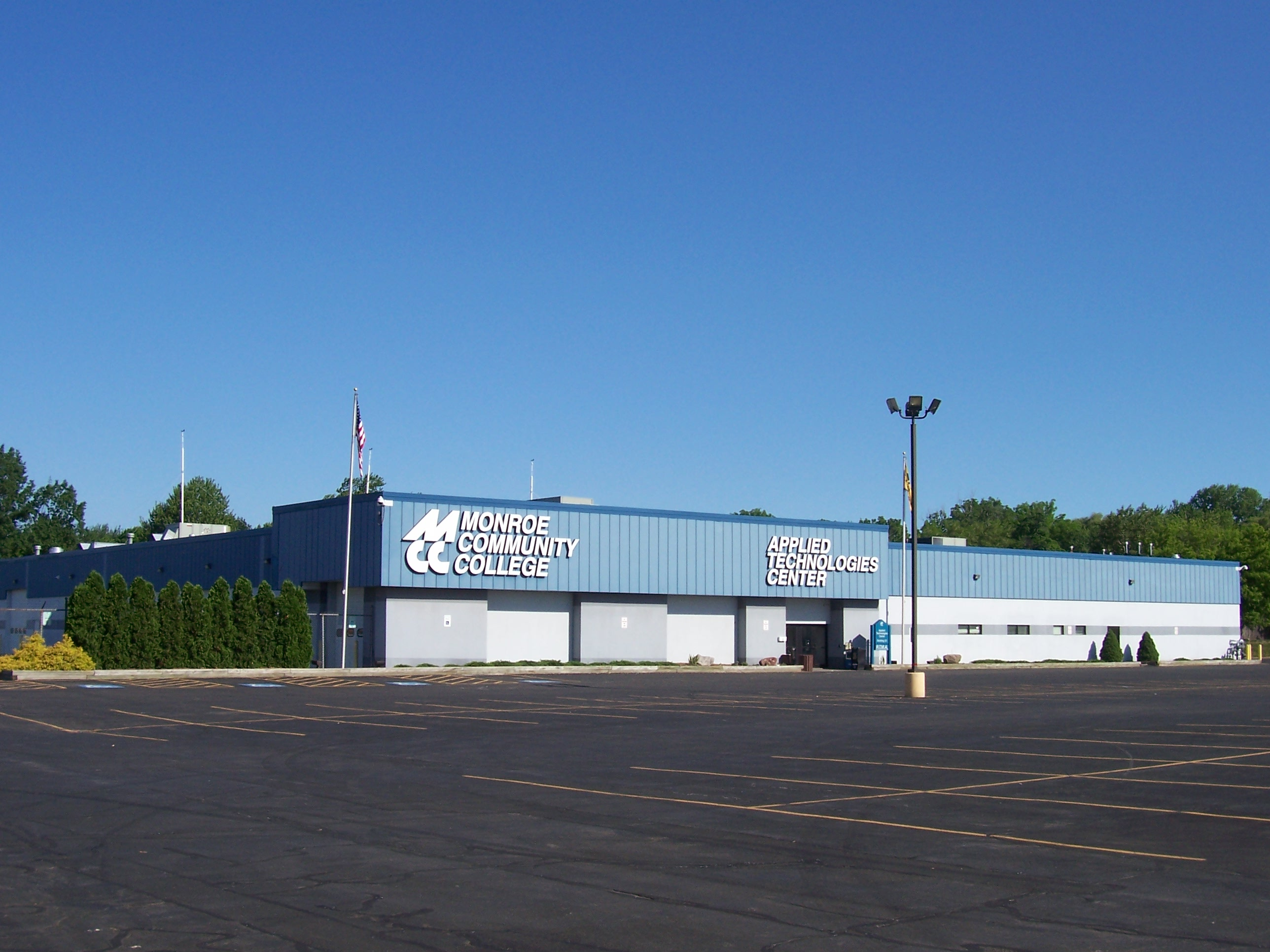
The Applied Technologies Center

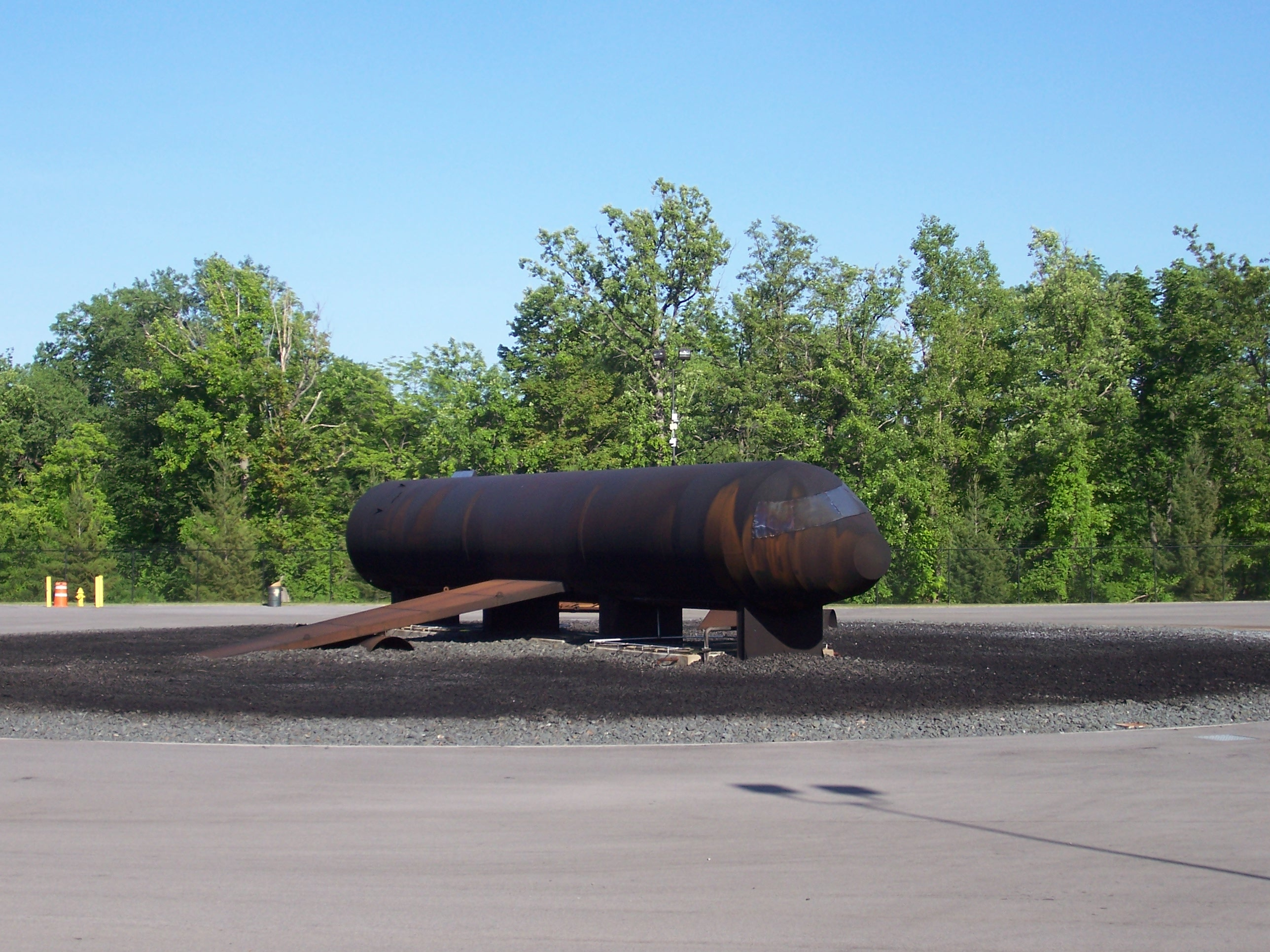
Aviation accident training area at the Monroe County Public Safety Training Facility

== Academics ==
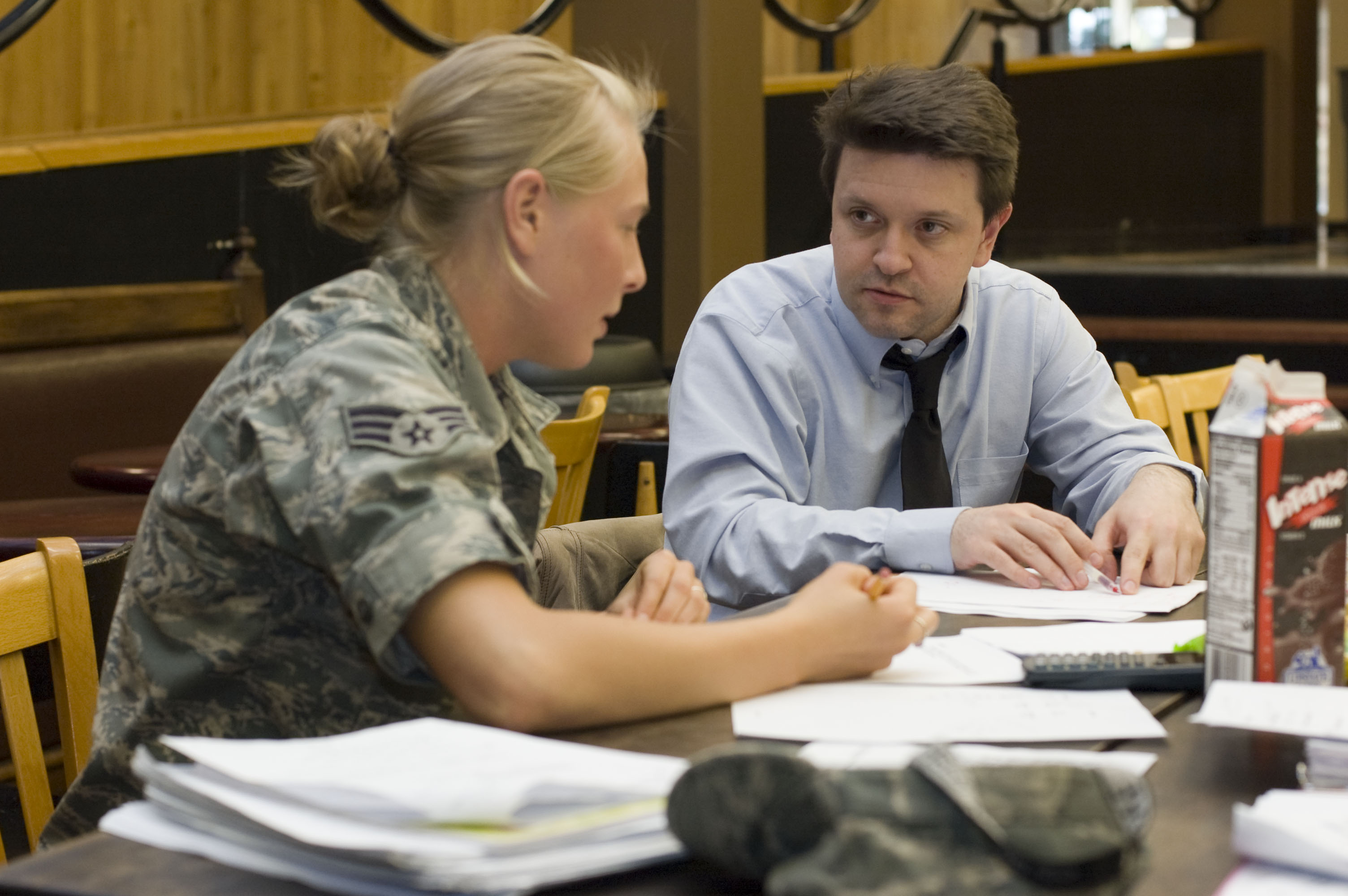
Students studying at Monroe Community College

Monroe Community College offers 100+ degree and certification programs.

Of the approximately 25,000+ students who take classes through Monroe Community College annually, 65 percent are under 25 years old, and more than half are women. The majority of students are enrolled in certificate and degree programs. In addition, the college trains the area's workforce through open enrollment and corporate training programs, serving small to mid-size employers.

MCC offers a "2+2" transfer program, in which students enroll in a program to earn their associate degree in two years with the intent of transferring to a college or university — such as the University of Rochester, Rochester Institute of Technology, Saint John Fisher University, Roberts Wesleyan College, SUNY Geneseo, SUNY Brockport, Nazareth College, or the Eastman School of Music — to complete a bachelor's degree.

== Student life ==
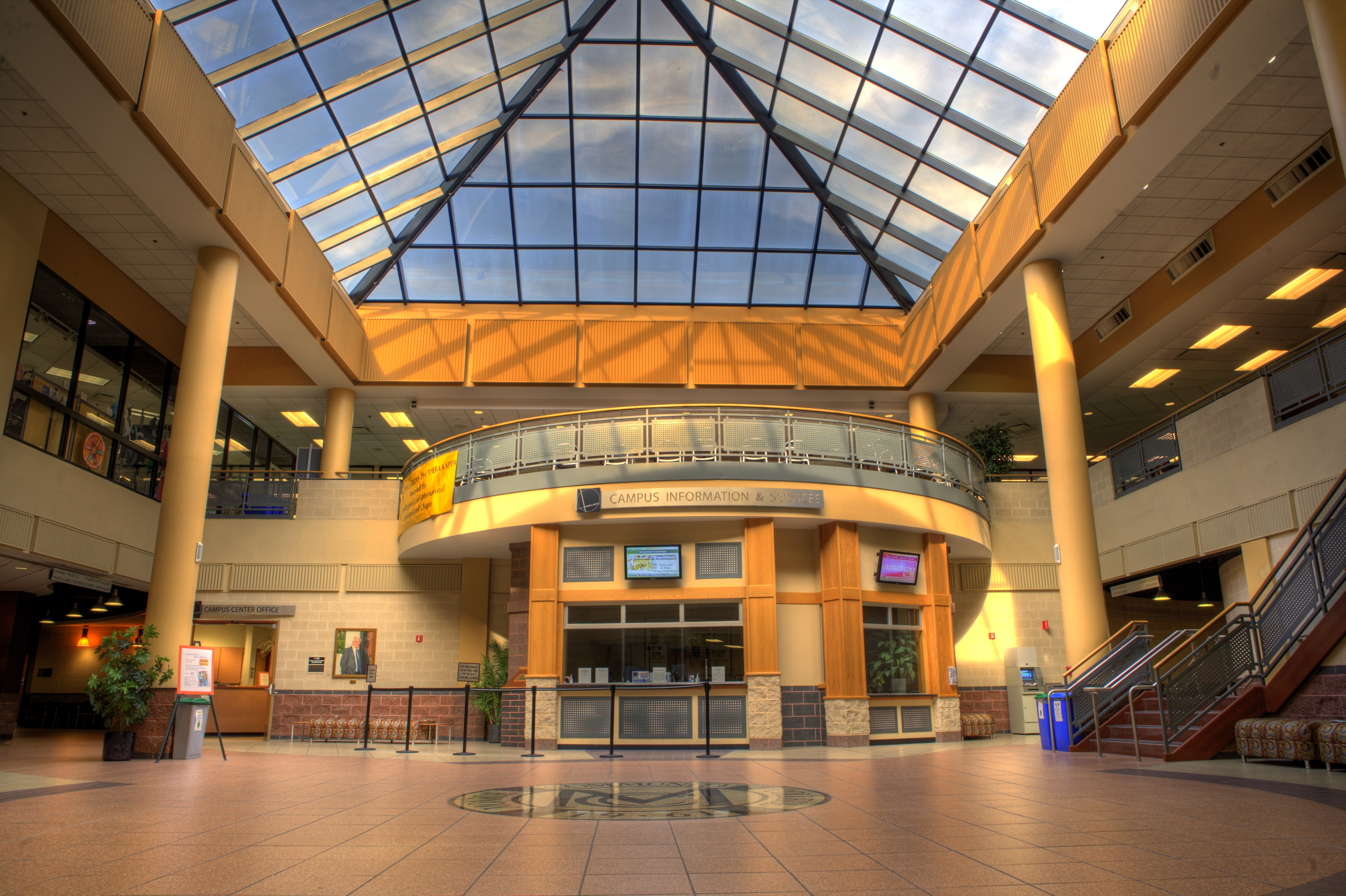
R. Thomas Flynn Campus Center at MCC Brighton Campus

MCC is home to over 60 chartered clubs and organizations. In Spring 2024, MCCA (an auxiliary board) defunded the independent student-run online radio station (WMCC). In 2025, both the radio and newspaper, the Monroe Doctrine, were permanently shut down despite student protests. The Monroe Maverick Substack (independent, student publication) emerged as a result.

The Student Association, of which all currently enrolled students are members, is governed by the Brighton Campus Student Government Association (SGA) and the Downtown Campus Student Events and Governance Association (SEGA).

The Campus Activities Board (CAB) is the events organization at MCC. The CAB sponsors on-campus activities such as Freestyle Fridays, Fall Fest and Spring Fling. CAB also brings in Guest Speakers to present on various current issues of interest to students.

Phi Theta Kappa, the international honor society of two-year colleges and academic programs, has a chapter on the MCC campus. The chapter also participates in the Honors in Action Study Topic and the College Project to remain a 5-star chapter.

MCC offers smart classrooms, interactive videoconferencing capabilities, eight electronic learning centers, the Warshof Conference Center, dental clinic, fitness and dance studios, a synthetic turf field, and a variety of dining and restaurant options. The Brighton Campus, along with the Applied Technologies Center on West Henrietta Road and the Downtown Campus is completely wireless. A 56,000 sq ft (5,200 m^{2}) athletics facility – the PAC Center – is also located on the Brighton Campus.

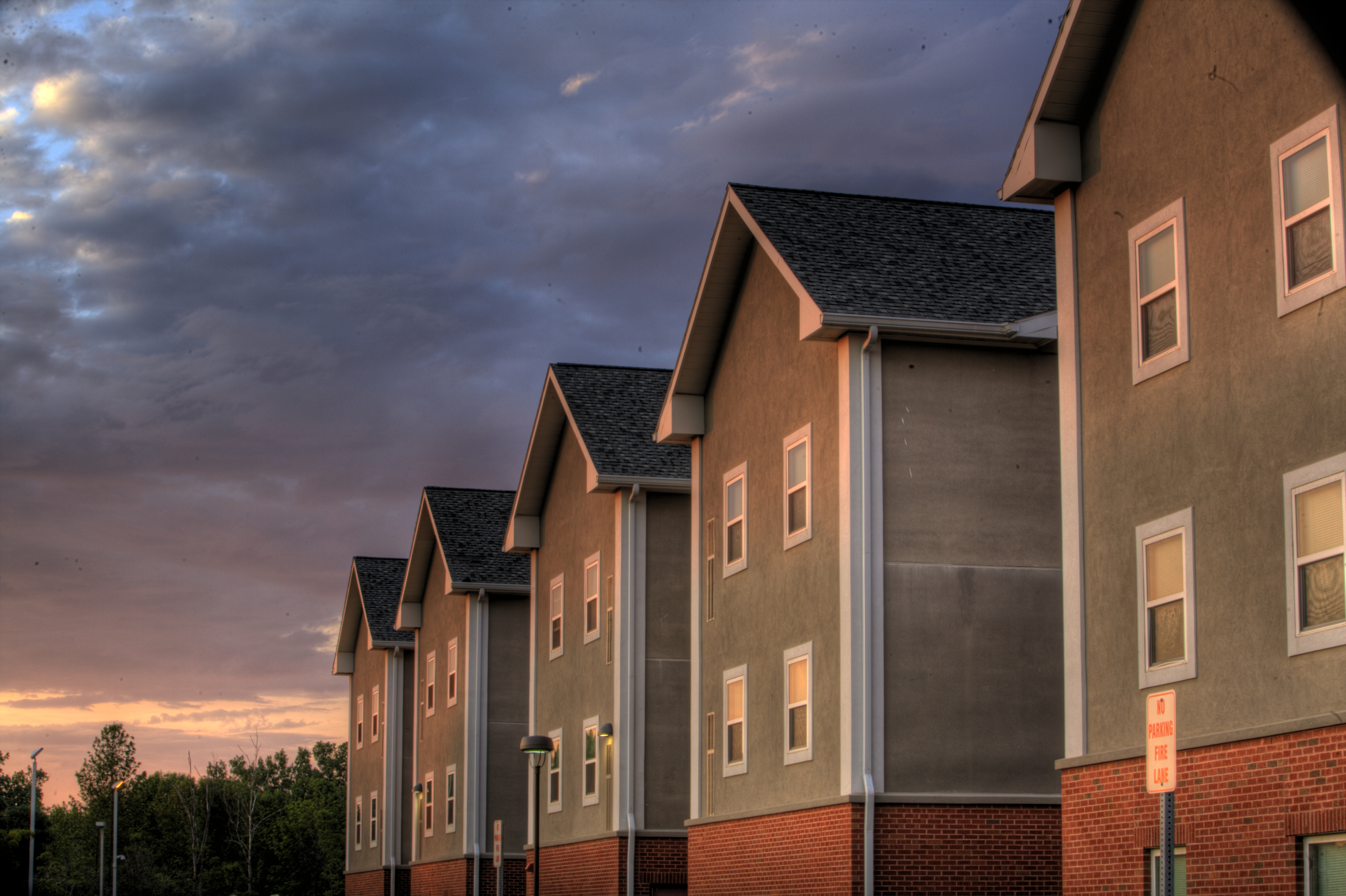
Monroe Community College residence halls

MCC provides residence halls for on-campus living. The Alice Holloway Young Residence Halls opened on the Brighton Campus in 2003, in honor of Alice Holloway Young, a trustee of the college. There are four residence halls: Alexander Hall, Canal Hall, Pioneer Hall, and Tribune Hall.

=== Athletics ===
The logo of the MCC Tribunes

The Monroe Community College athletics program, commonly known as the MCC Tribunes, competes in the National Junior College Athletic Association (NJCAA) in Region 3. MCC's athletics program began in 1962 with a men's basketball team coached by George C. Monagan, the school's athletic director from 1962 to 1988. Men's soccer and baseball teams were added the following year. As of 2022, the Tribunes' website lists 12 active programs (5 men's teams, 6 women's teams, and a co-ed esports team).

The school's athletic facilities include an indoor recreational center with a turf field and running track, an aquatic center, a basketball court, and outdoor fields for baseball, softball, and soccer/lacrosse. John L. DiMarco Field, a 1,500-seat outdoor venue used by MCC's soccer and lacrosse teams, also served as the home of professional soccer team Rochester New York FC in 2022. The team folded afterwards.

== Title IX ==
On April 27, 2016, the U.S. Department of Education opened a federal Investigation to investigate if MCC had violated Title IX.

== Notable people ==
=== Alumni ===
- Hadji Barry, soccer player
- Kelly Brannigan, model (Deal or No Deal)
- Alyssa Lane (2012), professional wrestler performing in WWE as Kayden Carter.
- Robert Duffy (1975, 1988), Mayor of the City of Rochester, Lieutenant Governor of New York
- Marcus Feagin, professional basketball player
- Kimika Forbes, association football goalkeeper for Trinidad and Tobago women's national football team
- Lou Gramm (1971), original lead singer of Foreigner
- Travis McCoy, lead singer of Gym Class Heroes
- Tim Redding, former Major League Baseball pitcher
- Dave Sarachan, assistant coach, LA Galaxy; former head coach, Chicago Fire, and U.S. soccer player
- Jeff Sluman (1977), professional golfer
- Cathy Turner (1984), Olympic gold medalist

=== Faculty ===
- Otis Young, first black actor to star in a television western, The Outcasts; former assistant professor of Communications and head of the Drama Department at MCC from 1989 to 1999. Professor Young died in 2001.
