= Marcus Feagin =

American-basketball player (born 1991)

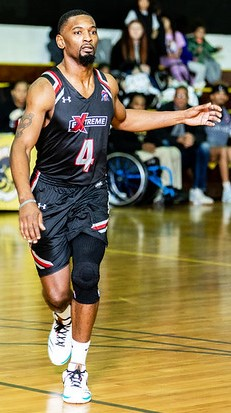

No. 0 – Buffalo eXtreme
- Position: Forward
- League: ABA

Personal information
- Born: July 26, 1991 (age 35) Niagara Falls, New York, US
- Listed height: 6 ft 3 in (1.91 m)

Career information
- High school: Niagara Falls (2007–2011)
- College: Monroe CC (2011–2012)
- NBA draft: 2013: undrafted
- Playing career: 2015–present

Career history
- 2015: Buffalo 716ers
- 2016: WNY Thundersnow
- 2016–2019: Chautauqua Hurricane
- 2021: Chalchuapa United (LMB)
- 2022: Chautauqua Hurricane
- 2023: Santa Ana BC (LMB)
- 2023: Jamestown Jackals
- 2023–present: Buffalo eXtreme
- 2024–present: Tigres de Chinandega (LSB)

Career highlights
- All-ABA Honorable Mention (2026); All-ABA Second Team (2025); LSB All-Star (2024); ABA All-Star (2024); All-ABA First Team (2024); PBL All-Star (2022)

Marcus Desmond Feagin (born July 26, 1991) is an American professional basketball player for the Buffalo eXtreme of the American Basketball Association (ABA). He also competes for Tigres de Chinandega of Liga Superior de Baloncesto (LSB).

Feagin previously played college basketball for Monroe Community College. He is a renowned rebounder, having statistically led multiple teams and leagues.

== History ==
=== High school career ===
Marcus Feagin was born in Niagara Falls, New York to Anthony Feagin and Shellie Thomas.

He did not play organized basketball until his junior year at Niagara Falls High School. During his senior year, Feagin led his team to a 19–2 record and the Section VI Class A finals.

Among the numerous honors Feagin received following his senior campaign, they included Niagara Gazette Player of the Year, All-Western New York, All-League, and All-Centercourt.

=== Collegiate career ===
Feagin committed to playing at Monroe Community College in May 2011.

In his single season with the Monroe Tribunes in 2011–12, Feagin averaged 6 rebounds per game and led the team.

=== Professional career ===
The Buffalo 716ers of the Premier Basketball League (PBL) signed Feagin in September 2015. After playing in preseason exhibitions for the team, he left to join the Western New York Thundersnow in January 2016. He was then traded soon after to the Chautauqua Hurricane, where he finished the 2015–16 PBL season.

After four seasons with the Hurricane, Feagin left the team in December 2019 to play in Mexico.

Feagin played for Chalchuapa United of Liga Mayor de Baloncesto in 2021.

He returned to the Chautauqua Hurricane for their final season in 2022, and was named to the 2022 PBL All-Star Team.

Feagin played for Santa Ana BC of Liga Mayor de Baloncesto at the start of 2023, and then continued his year playing for the Jamestown Jackals in The Basketball League.

He was signed by the Buffalo eXtreme of the American Basketball Association (ABA) in October 2023. Feagin hit a buzzer beater to win the team's inaugural game in November 2023. For the 2023–24 season, he led both the team and league in all rebounding categories. Feagin was recognized as an ABA All-Star and All-ABA First Team selection.

Feagin began playing for Tigres de Chinandega of Liga Superior de Baloncesto (LSB) in August 2024. He led the team in rebounding, and was recognized as a LSB All-Star.

After once again leading both the Buffalo eXtreme and ABA in rebounding for the 2024–25 season, he was named to the All-ABA Second Team.
