= R. Thomas Flynn =

4th President of Monroe Community College
- In office February 9, 2000 – August 1, 2008
- Preceded by: Peter Spina
- Succeeded by: Larry W Tyree

Personal details
- Born: January 29, 1938 (age 88) Bluffs, Illinois, U.S.
- Spouse: Kate Niebling (m. 1963)
- Education: MacMurray College (BA); University of Montana (MA)
- Profession: Professor

R. Thomas Flynn (born January 29, 1938) is an American college administrator who served as president of Monroe Community College (MCC) in Rochester, New York. The R. Thomas Flynn Campus Center on the MCC campus is named in his honor.

== Early life and education ==
Flynn was born in Bluffs, Illinois to factory workers Bernard and Myrtle Flynn. He grew up in nearby Canton, Illinois. Flynn was a good baseball and basketball player and earned a scholarship to Bradley University; he was injured and lost the scholarship.

Flynn received a bachelor's degree from MacMurray College in Jacksonville, Illinois and a master's in education from the University of Montana.

== Career ==
Flynn taught mathematics for one year at St Andrew's School in Boca Raton, Florida before joining Rutgers University as assistant dean of student services between 1965 and 1969. He was dean of student services at Ocean Community College 1969–1974. In 1974, he joined Monroe Community College as vice president of student services, a post he held for 20 years. He then became vice president of administrative and student services in 1994. He was made interim president in 1999 and president of the college in 2000.

Flynn worked with the University at Albany, SUNY to establish a Joint Admission Program that guarantees MCC students admission to SUNY as juniors after completing their two years of study at MCC. He collaborated with the Rochester Institute of Technology on the Rochester Biomedical Experience, a program to increase minority participation in biomedical-related fields.

After the terrorist attacks of September 11, 2001, Flynn created the Homeland Security Management Institute, which helps businesses and government agencies prepare for emergencies.

On September 15, 2007, Flynn was a charter signatory of the American College and University Presidents Climate Commitment, which commits colleges and universities to take steps to reduce global warming. He retired in 2008.

== Awards ==
Flynn received the first President of the Year Award from the American Student Association of Community Colleges. In 2008, he was awarded Phi Theta Kappa International Honor Society's 2008 Michael Bennett Lifetime Achievement Award.

The R. Thomas Flynn Campus Center on the MCC campus, built during his tenure, is named in his honor.

== Personal life ==
Flynn married Kate Niebling on June 15, 1963. They have one son and one daughter.

Academic offices
Preceded by Peter A. Spina	President of Monroe Community College; 2000 - 2008	Succeeded by Larry W. Tyree (interim)
