= 2008 Premier Basketball League season =

The 2008 Premier Basketball League season was the first in the league's history, and ended with the Rochester Razorsharks winning the inaugural PBL championship. Ten teams played a 20-game regular season schedule, and all ten teams would qualify for the league playoffs.

== Final standings ==
| Eastern Division | W | L | Pct. | GB |
|---|---|---|---|---|
| Rochester Razorsharks | 18 | 2 | .900 | — |
| Wilmington Sea Dawgs | 11 | 9 | .550 | 7 |
| Reading Railers | 11 | 9 | .550 | 7 |
| Jacksonville SLAM | 8 | 12 | .400 | 10 |
| Maryland Nighthawks | 6 | 14 | .300 | 12 |

| Western Division | W | L | Pct. | GB |
|---|---|---|---|---|
| Quad Cities Riverhawks | 15 | 5 | .650 | — |
| Arkansas Impact | 10 | 10 | .500 | 5 |
| Rockford Fury | 9 | 11 | .450 | 6 |
| Dallas Defenders | 8 | 12 | .400 | 7 |
| Chicago Throwbacks | 5 | 15 | .250 | 10 |

== Playoff Bracket ==
First Round; Tuesday, March 18; Attack Athletics, Chicago | Division Semifinals; Wednesday, March 19; Attack Athletics, Chicago
2 | Wilmington | 112
5 | Maryland | 125
5 | Maryland | 96
3 | Reading | 105
3 | Reading | 135
4 | Jacksonville | 119
Eastern Division
2 | Arkansas | 115
5 | Chicago | 102
2 | Arkansas | 112
3 | Rockford | 108
3 | Rockford | 121
4 | Dallas | 108

Division Finals; Thursday, March 20; Blue Cross Arena, Rochester and Wharton Field House, Moline
1 | Rochester | 100
3 | Reading | 76
1 | Quad Cities | 93
2 | Arkansas | 102

PBL Championship Game; Sunday, March 30; Blue Cross Arena, Rochester
E1 | Rochester | 142
W2 | Arkansas | 112
