= Archbishop Walsh High School =

Archbishop Walsh Academy and Southern Tier Catholic School
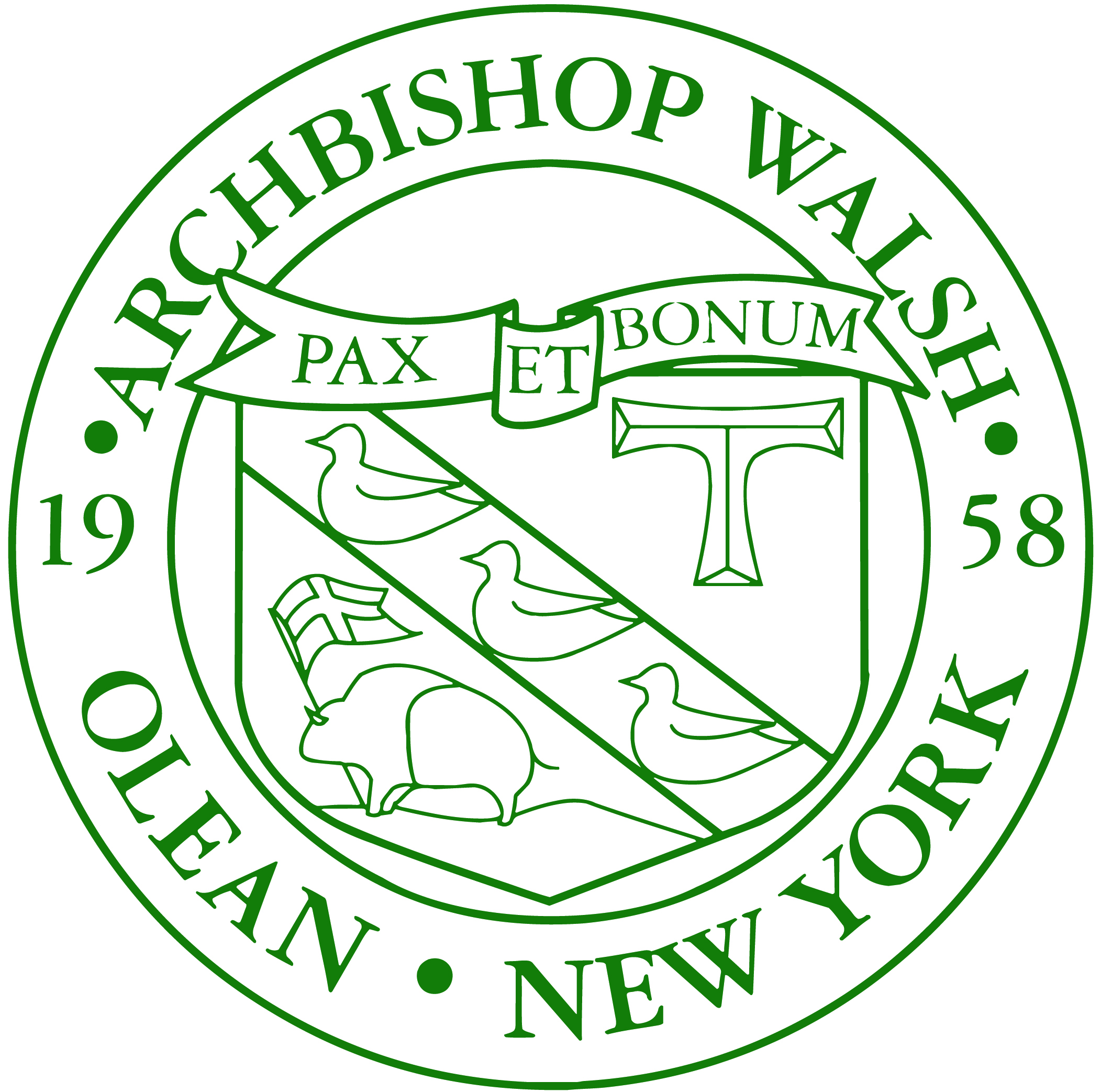
- Archbishop Walsh Academy logo

Location
- 208 North 24th Street; Olean, (Cattaraugus County), New York 14760; United States
- Coordinates: 42°4′38″N 78°27′43″W

Information
- Type: Private, Coeducational
- Religious affiliation: Roman Catholic
- Established: 1958
- Status: Open
- School district: Olean Region
- Authority: Buffalo Diocese
- Principal: Bethann Owens
- Faculty: 21 teachers (K-12)
- Grades: Pre-K-12
- Average class size: 9 students
- Student to teacher ratio: 6:1
- Colors: Green and White
- Slogan: Once an eagle, always an eagle
- Athletics conference: Monsignor Martin Athletic Association
- Team name: Eagles
- Yearbook: Aerie
- Tuition: $7,360 (HS), $4,822 (Elementary)
- Communities served: Olean, Allegany, Portville, Ellicottville, Salamanca, Bradford PA
- Authorizations: International Baccalaureate Diploma Programme
- Faculty with advanced degrees: 22%
- President: Colleen Taggerty
- Website: www.stcswalsh.org

Archbishop Walsh Academy is a private, Roman Catholic high school in Olean, New York. It is a college preparatory, co-ed, day school, serving students from both New York Pennsylvania. Southern Tier Catholic School is the Montessori preschool, elementary, middle school, and high school located on the same campus.

== Background ==
Archbishop Walsh was established in 1958 and is the only Catholic high school in Western New York south of Cattaraugus Creek. Constructed at the height of the Cold War, the building's foundation included a fall out shelter for students and faculty in the event nuclear war found its way to the Enchanted Mountains. Today the shelter is used primarily for storage . Students began a tradition of signing their names in paint on the shelter's walls to memorialize their experience at the school.Walsh had a rich history in basketball.
