= Darren Fenn =

American basketball player (born 1980)

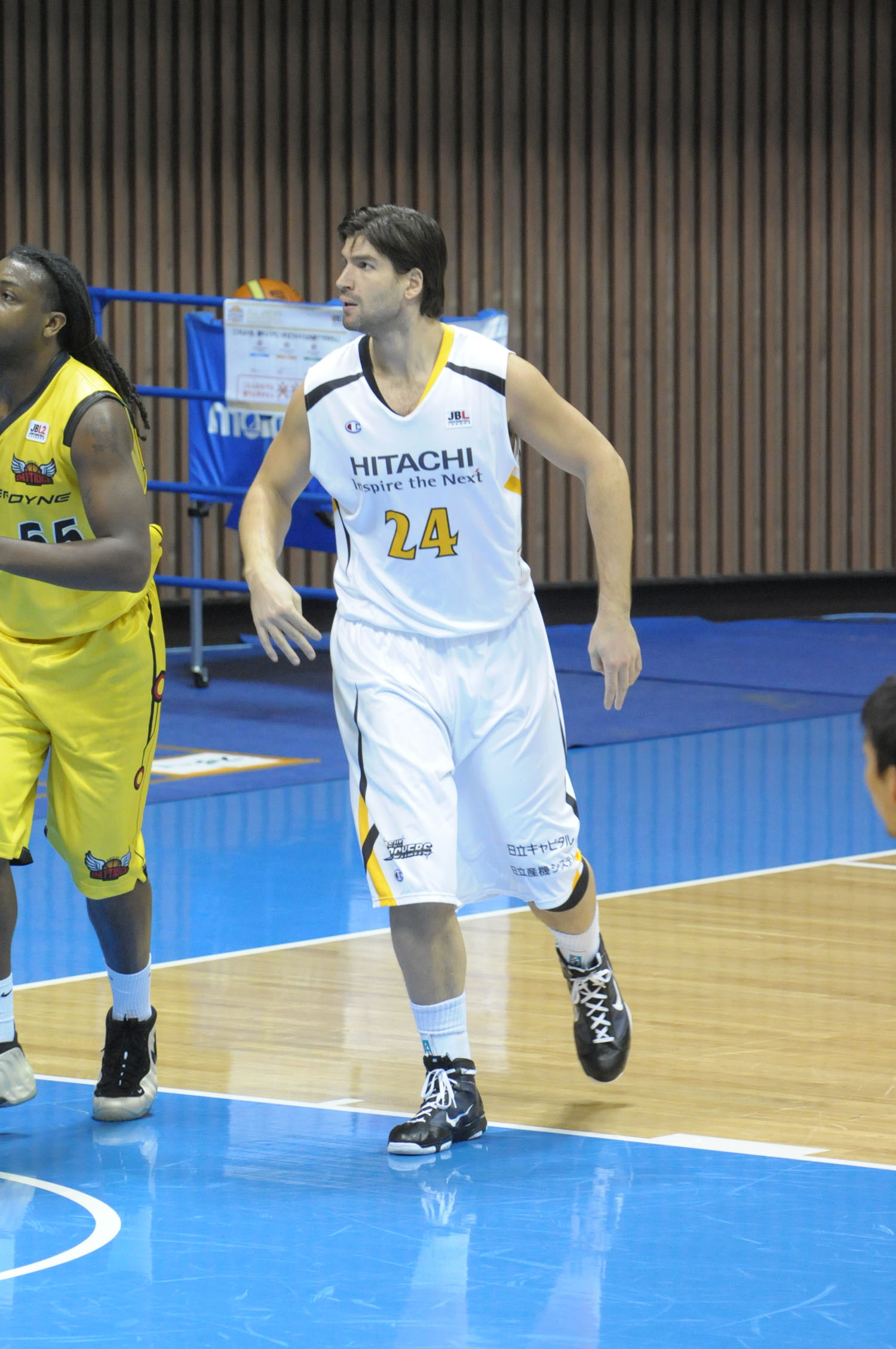
- Fenn in 2013

Personal information
- Born: February 17, 1980 (age 46) Tonawanda, New York, US
- Listed height: 6 ft 10 in (2.08 m)

Career information
- High school: Canisius High School
- College: Canisius College (1997–2001)
- Playing career: 2001–2014
- Position: Center
- Number: 24
- Coaching career: 2016–present

Career history

Coaching
- 2016–2017: Nichols School
- 2025–present: Perry High School

Career highlights
- Canisius Sports Hall of Fame (2012); BBL All-Star Game MVP (2009); German Champion (2007); All-BBL (2007); Canisius Athletic Hall of Fame (2007)

Darren Fenn (born February 17, 1980), is an American former professional basketball player and current owner of the Buffalo eXtreme. Fenn also owns and operates the XGen Elite basketball academy in West Seneca.

He is currently head coach of the girls basketball team at Perry High School in Gilbert, Arizona.

== Early life ==
Fenn was born in Tonawanda, New York. He played basketball at Canisius High School, where he was named Western New York Player of the Year in 1997. He later played college basketball for Canisius College, where he was team captain for their 2001–01 season and led his squad to the 2001 MAAC men's basketball tournament championship game.

== Playing career ==
After turning professional, Fenn played internationally with Limoges CSP (2001–2002), PBC Ural Great Perm (2004), KK Bosna (2004–2005), KB Trepça (2005), Eisbären Bremerhaven (2005–2006), Bamberg Baskets (2006–2008), Artland Dragons (2008–2012), Hitachi SunRockers (2012–2013), JDA Dijon Basket (2013), BC SCM Timișoara (2014) and s.Oliver Baskets (2014).

He won the 2004 Russian Basketball Cup with PBC Ural Great Perm, and the 2005 Basketball Cup of Bosnia and Herzegovina with KK Bosna. Fenn was honored as All-BBL following the 2006–07 season where he won the German Championship with the Bamberg Baskets, and was named MVP of the 2009 BBL All-Star Game.

== Coaching career ==
Fenn founded WNY Premier Basketball Training in 2015. He was head coach of Nichols School for their 2016–17 season, but left to run basketball operations at St. Mary's High School after they offered space for his business. Fenn renamed his business to XGen Elite, and the company relocated to XGen Elite Sports Complex in West Seneca. Jordan Nwora of the National Basketball Association was trained by Fenn at the facility.

He founded the Buffalo eXtreme of the American Basketball Association in 2023, which plays within his XGen Elite Sports Complex.

Fenn was hired as the girls basketball head coach at Perry High School in 2025.

== Personal life ==
He is married to Kimberly Cross and they have two children. Fenn's oldest daughter Sydney currently plays for the Indiana Hoosiers, and his youngest daughter Alexis has a pending offer to play for the Le Moyne Dolphins.

Fenn was inducted into the Canisius High School Athletic Hall of Fame in 2007 and the Canisius College Sports Hall of Fame in 2012.
