= Javon McCrea =

American basketball player (born 1992)

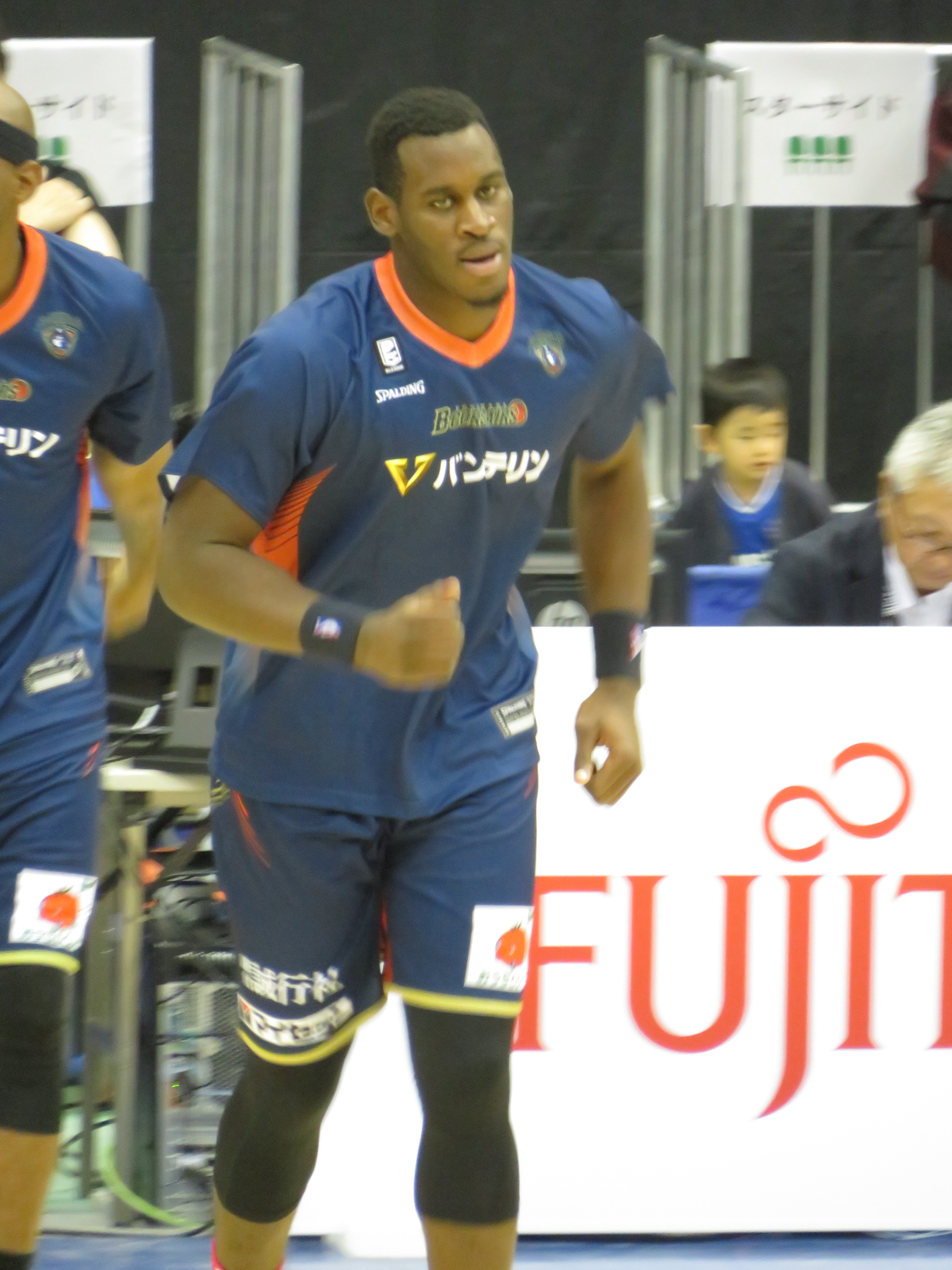
- McCrea with the Yokohama B-Corsairs in 2018

No. 12 – Buffalo eXtreme
- Position: Power forward / center

Personal information
- Born: November 5, 1992 (age 34)
- Listed height: 6 ft 7 in (2.01 m)
- Listed weight: 250 lb (113 kg)

Career information
- High school: Newark (Newark, New York)
- College: Buffalo (2010–2014)
- NBA draft: 2014: undrafted
- Playing career: 2014–present

Career history
- 2014–2015: Medi Bayreuth
- 2015: SLUC Nancy
- 2016: Cangrejeros de Santurce
- 2016–2017: Maccabi Rishon LeZion
- 2017: Medi Bayreuth
- 2017–2018: Tigers Tübingen
- 2018: Santeros de Aguada
- 2018: Yokohama B-Corsairs
- 2023–present: Buffalo eXtreme

Career highlights
- All-ABA Second Team (2026); ABA All-Star (2024); All-ABA First Team (2024); MAC Player of the Year (2014); AP Honorable Mention All-American (2014); 3× All-MAC First Team (2012–2014); MAC Freshman of the Year (2011)

Javon Tyree McCrea (born November 5, 1992) is an American professional basketball player for the Buffalo eXtreme of the American Basketball Association. Born in Newark, New York, he played college basketball for the Buffalo Bulls between 2010 and 2014.

== Early life ==
McCrea was discovered at the age of 13 by John Wallace, and was recruited to play basketball for Wallace's AAU team in Rochester, New York. He played at Newark High School, and was named Finger Lakes Times Player of the Year for three straight seasons.

== College career ==
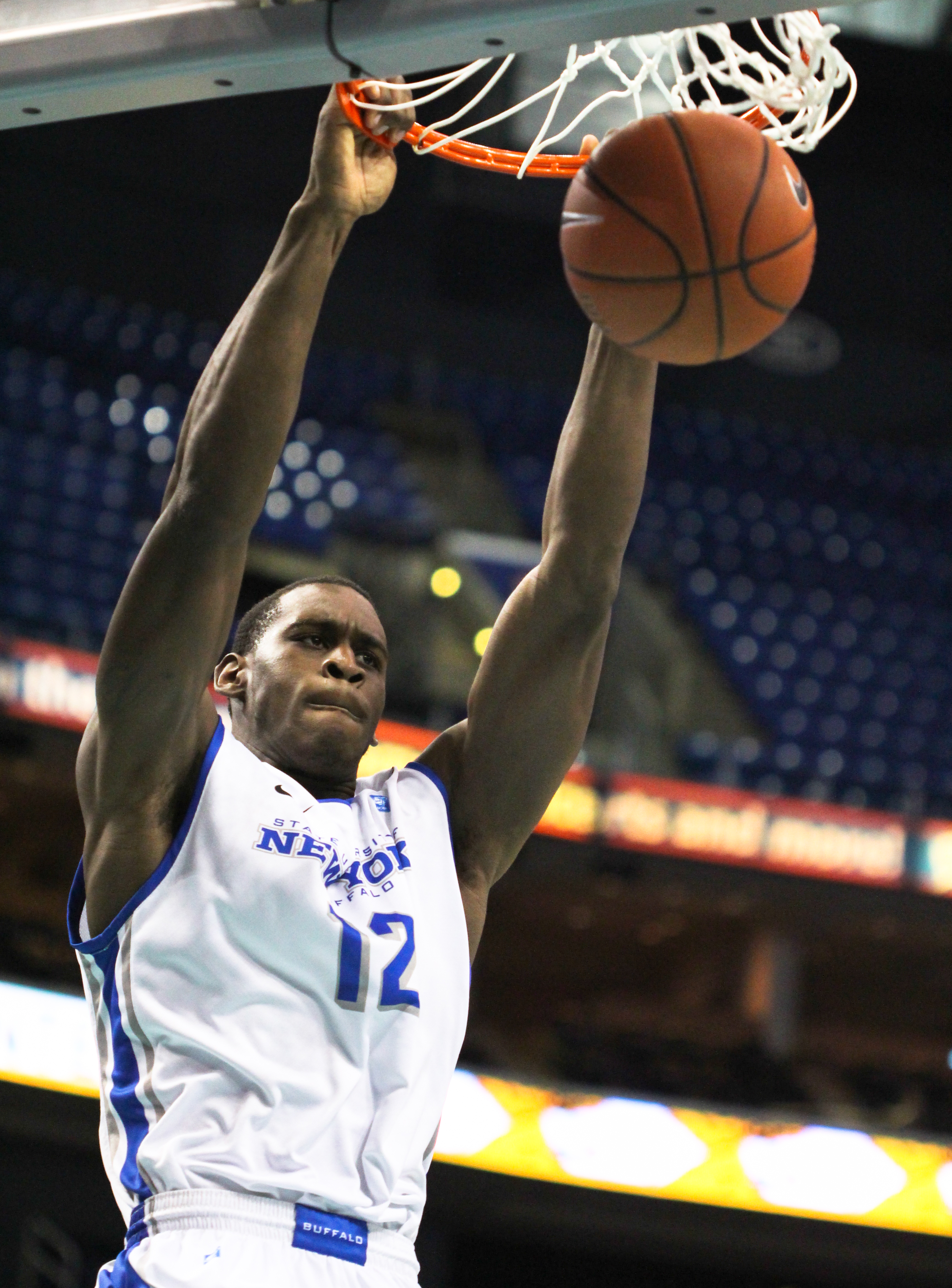
McCrea during his college career at Buffalo.

McCrea was named the Mid-American Conference Player of the Year and an Associated Press Honorable Mention All-American in 2014. McCrea was also named to the All-MAC First Team during his sophomore, junior, and senior years. Additionally, he was named the MAC East Player of the Week seven times during his final three seasons. During his senior year, McCrea was one of fewer than 20 NCAA Division I men's basketball players to average a double-double. He became Buffalo's all-time leading scorer with 2,004 points. McCrea also recorded 164 steals, 250 blocks, 250 assists, and 988 rebounds.

== Professional career ==
After going undrafted in the 2014 NBA draft and playing with the Dallas Mavericks in the NBA Summer League, McCrea signed with Medi Bayreuth in Germany. With Medi Bayreuth, McCrea averaged 14.7 points and 5.5 rebounds per game while shooting 59.7% from the field, while only playing in 24.3 minutes per game. He played in 25 games, starting in 24 of them.

For the NBA Summer League, McCrea joined the Brooklyn Nets. On August 6, 2015, McCrea signed with SLUC Nancy in the French LNB Pro A.

On February 9, 2016, McCrea signed with Cangrejeros de Santurce of Baloncesto Superior Nacional. In 12 games, McCrea averaged 16.3 PPG and 8.4 RPG.

On April 11, 2016, McCrea signed with Spirou Charleroi of Basketball League Belgium Division I. On April 20, however, the club announced it would not sign McCrea because he failed medical tests with two separate doctors. Apparently, the medical dossier for McCrea was too optimistic and did not reflect his real medical condition.

In the summer of 2016, McCrea was named to the Philadelphia 76ers NBA Summer League roster.

On August 16, 2016, McCrea signed with the Israeli team Maccabi Rishon LeZion for the 2016–17 season.

On July 27, 2017, McCrea signed with the Belgian team Telenet Oostende for the 2017–18 season. However his contract was voided after he failed to pass the physicals. On November 1, 2017, he signed a one-month contract with his former club Medi Bayreuth. On December 22, 2017, he signed with Tigers Tübingen.

On March 21, 2018, McCrea signed with Santeros de Aguada of the Baloncesto Superior Nacional in Puerto Rico.

On October 5, 2018, McCrea signed with Yokohama B-Corsairs of the B.League in Japan.

On October 3, 2023, McCrea was announced as the first signing of the Buffalo eXtreme of the American Basketball Association. After leading the team in blocks during the 2023–24 season, he was recognized as an ABA All-Star and All-ABA First Team selection.

McCrea played for the Herkimer Originals in The Basketball Tournament 2024, and they were eliminated in the first round.
