= Jacksonville SLAM =

Former Premier Basketball League team

- Founded: 2008
- League: PBL 2008
- Team history: Jacksonville SLAM; 2008
- Based in: Jacksonville, Florida
- Arena: TBD
- Colors: Red, Teal, Black
- Owner: PBL
- Head coach: Scott Cooper
- Championships: 0

The Jacksonville SLAM was a team in the Premier Basketball League. They were a successor of sorts to the Jacksonville JAM.

The SLAM came into existence after a public dispute between the owner of the JAM and his players and coaches on getting payment for services. After seeming to resolve the conflict, the PBL announced that the ownership of the JAM had failed to meet obligations and that the league was taking control of the franchise. The PBL records and some of the players were transferred to the league-run entity. Notably, the coach declined to join the new entity. The owner retained the name of JAM.

On February 13, 2008, USBasket reported that Scott Cooper was named the head coach.

When the slate of 2008-2009 teams for the PBL was announced, the SLAM was not listed on it and therefore it is considered folded.
