= Roy Vongtama =

- Born: Buffalo, NY

Roy Vongtama is an American professional actor as well as a Board certified Radiation oncologist. He grew up in the Buffalo suburb of Orchard Park and now resides in Santa Monica, CA.

== Acting ==
Acting since 2001, Vongtama first appeared on ABC's reality show The Ultimate Love Test. He has since appeared on television in episodes of the NBC show Windfall, the FX show The Shield, as well as a recurring role on TLC's Untold Stories of the ER. Filmwise, he is a lead actor in the recently completed independent feature, The Wrath. Vongtama appeared in Warner Bros.'s 2007 feature, The Bucket List, starring Jack Nicholson and Morgan Freeman.

He has also worked in theater and recorded several audio books.

== Medicine ==
Vongtama graduated magna cum laude with a BA in the Biological Basis of Behavior from the University of Pennsylvania in 1996 and subsequently graduated from SUNY Buffalo School of Medicine in 2000 with his medical degree. His studies continued at UCLA where he finished his residency training in the field of Radiation Oncology in 2005.
