= Monsignor Martin Athletic Association =

The Monsignor Martin Athletic Association is a high school sports league founded in 1948 and comprising Catholic high schools and two private secular schools in Western New York, United States. All but two of the schools are located in Erie County.

For each sport, the league is divided by two divisions - Class AA (large schools) and Class A (small schools). Members compete for the Supremacy Cup, awarded to the school in each division that wins the most championships during a school year.

== Current members ==
=== Boys ===
- Bishop Timon - St. Jude High School
- Canisius High School
- Saint Francis High School
- St. Joseph's Collegiate Institute

=== Girls ===
- The Buffalo Seminary
- Mount Mercy Academy
- Mount Saint Mary Academy
- Nardin Academy
- Buffalo Academy of the Sacred Heart

=== Co-educational ===
- Archbishop Walsh High School (in Cattaraugus County)
- Cardinal O'Hara High School
- Nichols School (private/grades 5–12)
- St. Mary's High School
- The Park School of Buffalo (private)

== Former members ==
- Bishop Colton High School
- Bishop Fallon High School
- Bishop Gibbons High School
- Bishop McMahon High School
- Bishop Neumann High School
- Bishop O'Hern High School
- Bishop Ryan High School (-1971)
- Calasanctius Preparatory School
- Cardinal Dougherty High School
- DeSales Catholic High School
- Father Baker High School
- Holy Angels Academy (-2014)
- Immaculate Heart of Mary, Villa Maria (-2004)
- Immaculata Academy (-2016)
- Mount Saint Joseph's Academy
- Niagara Catholic High School (in Niagara County), merged from Madonna and Bishop Duffy (-2018)
- Stella Niagara Seminary
- Turner-Carroll High School (1960-2003), merged from Archbishop Carroll and Bishop Turner
