= SUNY Brockport =

Public university in Brockport, New York

State University of New York Brockport
- Former names: Brockport Collegiate Institute (1835–1866); Brockport State Normal School (1866–1942); Brockport State Teachers College (1942–1948); State University of New York at Brockport (1948–2005); The College at Brockport, State University of New York (2005–2020)
- Type: Public university
- Established: 1835; 191 years ago
- Parent institution: State University of New York
- Accreditation: MSCHE
- Budget: $158 million (2022)
- President: Dawn Meza Soufleris
- Faculty: 758
- Students: 7,928 (fall 2025)
- Undergraduates: 6,152 (fall 2025)
- Postgraduates: 1,776 (fall 2025)
- Location: Brockport, New York, United States; 43°12′43″N 77°57′00″W
- Campus: 464 acres (1.88 km^{2}); Fringe town
- Newspaper: The Stylus
- Colors: (Green and gold)
- Nickname: Golden Eagles
- Mascot: Ellsworth the Golden Eagle
- Website: brockport.edu

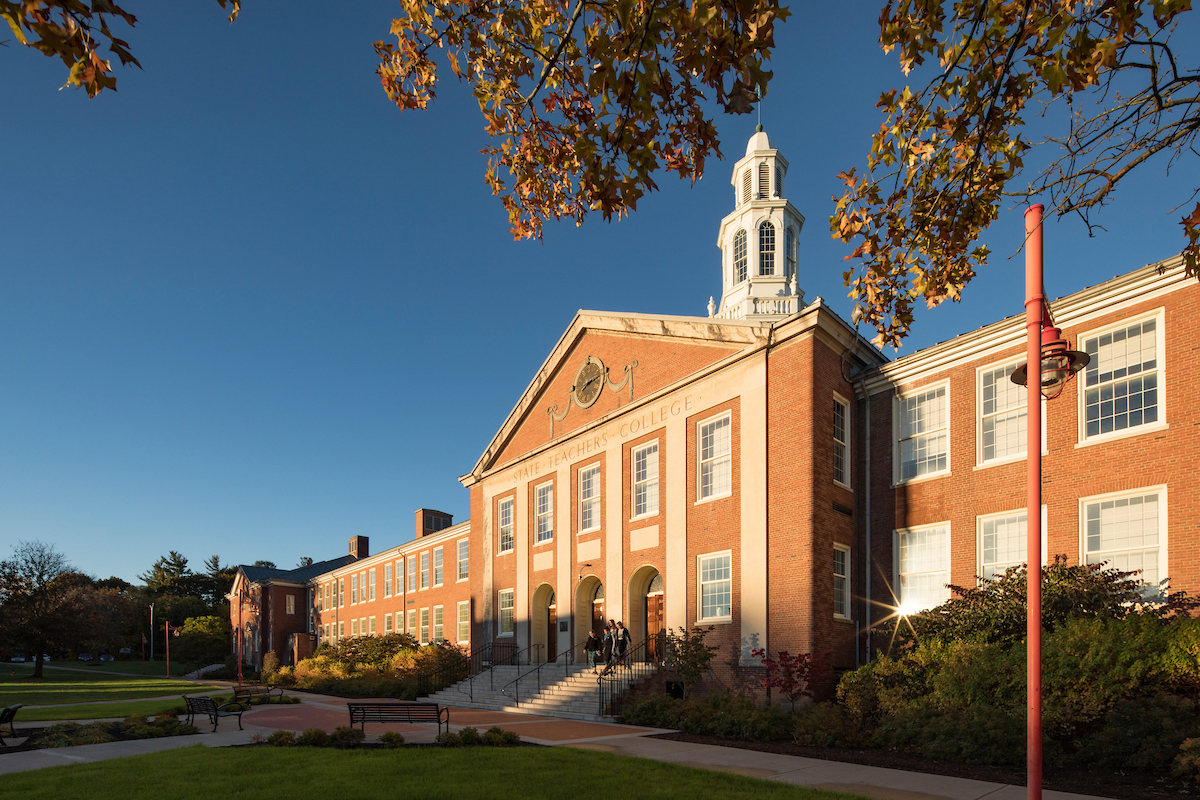
Hartwell Hall, SUNY Brockport

State University of New York Brockport (also known as SUNY Brockport or Brockport State, and previously The College at Brockport) is a public university in Brockport, New York, United States. It is part of the State University of New York (SUNY).

== History ==
SUNY Brockport was originally founded in 1835 as an institution of higher learning as the Brockport Collegiate Institute.

Over thirty years later, the school, through the leadership of principal Malcolm MacVicar, was absorbed into a New York-wide system of state-run normal schools in 1867 and changed its name to the Brockport State Normal School. For the next seven decades, the new institution would be primarily dedicated to training teachers, although other academic programs were maintained.

In 1942, the school gained the right to grant bachelor's degrees and was renamed as the Brockport State Teachers College. Six years later, the college joined the newly-established State University of New York system, becoming the State University of New York at Brockport. Only two years later, Brockport State began to grant graduate degrees, with the first master's degrees awarded in 1950.

Later name changes occurred in 2005, becoming the College at Brockport, State University of New York, and 2020, when it adopted a name similar to its 1948 original one, the State University of New York Brockport.

== Student life ==
Undergraduate demographics as of Fall 2023
Race and ethnicity	Total
White	68%
Black	12%
Hispanic	10%
Unknown	4%
Asian	3%
Two or more races	3%
International student	1%
Economic diversity
Low-income (Note: The percentage of students who received an income-based federal Pell grant intended for low-income students.)	38%
Affluent (Note: The percentage of students who are a part of the American middle class at the bare minimum.)	62%

=== Greek life ===
In 1869, with the assistance of Professor Charles Donald McLean, the principal of the school, Gamma Sigma fraternity was established at The Brockport Normal School. Gamma Sigma was the first fraternity to be formed at the high school level in the United States. On October 11 of that year, eighteen young men gathered in the chemistry room with the aim of enhancing their skills in debate, original composition, and other literary exercises. The founding members were: Edward L. Adams, John D. Burns, Charles Cunningham, William K. Dean, Martin L. Deyo, John Norris Drake, A. James Knox, S. E. Loomis, John M. Milne, A. Judson Osborn, Frederick Palmer, George T. Quinby, George Hebert Raymond, William H. Sybrandt, James W. White, Stephen D. Wilbur, Ara Wilkinson, and George F. Yeoman. Mr. Yeoman was elected as the first President, and James Knox served as the chairman of the constitution committee.

On a side note, in later years Mr. Yeoman took the oath of office as a justice of the Supreme Court for the Seventh Judicial District of the State on November 15, 1893. In the book "Notable Men of Rochester" published in 1902 by Dwight J. Stoddard, there is a mention of Mr. Yeoman's high level of respect and admiration.

=== Talon Television and Production (previously Brockport Television) ===
Funded by BSG, Talon Television is the official TV station club at The College at Brockport. This student-run organization is responsible for producing videos and covering a wide range of school programs and events. The club comprises different departments, including News, Sports, Entertainment, and Promotions.

=== Brockport Student Government (BSG) ===
The Brockport Student Government (BSG), funded by mandatory student fees, organizes a wide range of programming on campus. BSG encompasses the three traditional branches of government: legislative, judicial, and executive. The annual budget for BSG amounts to approximately $1,400,000. Among the programming events are the Spring Break Challenge, where five individuals have the opportunity to win $5,000 to fund their preferred spring break destination. Additionally, BSG arranges major concerts featuring artists such as Big Sean, Gym Class Heroes, Machine Gun Kelly, and Kesha, as well as lectures featuring notable speakers like Abby Wambach. These events are carefully planned and executed by the Brockport Student Government in collaboration with the Union Programming Team.

=== Harlequins Performing Arts Club ===
The Harlequins Performing Arts Club (Harlequins) is a student organization. Each semester, the club organizes a variety of student performances, workshops, and social events.

=== The Stylus ===
The Stylus is the student-run weekly newspaper of The College at Brockport. It is financially supported by the BSG Mandatory Fee and reaches a circulation of 5,000 copies.

=== WBSU 89.1 The Point ===
89.1 The Point is a student-run radio station located in the Seymour College Union and funded by the Brockport Student Government. The Point broadcasts to a wide audience of up to 500,000 people across the Western New York region, spanning from west Rochester to Buffalo. While the station has several communications majors as members, it also welcomes students from other majors to join. The Point operates various departments, including FM, Sports, News, Production, Circuit, Public Relations, Website, Engineering, and Sales. Additionally, The Point actively participates in community initiatives such as the Hilton Apple Fest in the fall and Coats for Kids in the winter, among other local events.

== Athletics ==
Brockport offers 23 athletic teams that compete at the NCAA Division III level as members of the Empire 8 conference (except for gymnastics, which competes in NCAA Division I)

== Notable faculty ==
- Sachio Ashida, research psychologist, judoka, and kamikaze pilot
- Garth Fagan (emeritus), Founder of Garth Fagan Dance
- Anne Panning, writer, winner of the 2006 Flannery O'Connor Award and 2009 NY Professor of the Year
- Albert Paley, Professor Emeritus, American sculptor

== Notable alumni ==
- Raymond J. McGrath, Former member of the US House of Representatives
- George Boley, Liberian ex-warlord, former leader of the Liberian Peace Council
- Wayne Cilento (B.S. in Dance, 1972): Tony Award-winning choreographer and director
- Scott Donaldson (2004): football coach
- John Faso, (B.A. Political Science and History, 1974) Republican member of the U.S. House of Representatives, from New York's 19th district
- William Fichtner (B.A. Criminal Justice, 1978), actor, known for his roles in Prison Break and The Dark Knight
- Willie Gilchrist (M.Ed. Administration, 1985), chancellor of Elizabeth City State University
- Jeffrey Grant, (B.S. Business and Economics, 1978): lawyer and minister who co-founded Progressive Prison Ministries and White Collar Support Group.
- Joseph Griffo, (B.A. Political Science, 1978) New York State Senator, former mayor of Rome, NY, and former county executive of Oneida County, New York
- Emma Stark Hampton, fifth national president, Woman's Relief Corps
- Delphine Hanna (teaching credential, 1874), physical education professor, Oberlin College
- Nancy Hewitt (B.A. in History, 1974): Professor emeritus at Rutgers University and expert on gender history and feminism
- Johnathan Ivy (B.S. in Sport Management, 2014): basketball player for the Buffalo eXtreme
- Joey Jackson (B.A. in Political Science, 1988): Attorney and legal analyst on CNN and HLN
- James Howard Kunstler (B.S. in Leisure/Recreational Activity, 1971): author, social critic, public speaker, blogger
- Christine Lavin (B.S. in English, 1973): Singer-songwriter and promoter of contemporary folk music
- Ryan Nobles (B.S. in Communication, 1998): journalist with CNN
- Oliver North, later attended the United States Naval Academy, known for Iran-Contra Affair
- Paul Pape (B.A. in Theatre, Speech & Hearing, 1974): actor and voice actor known for role as Double J in 1977 film Saturday Night Fever
- Yendi Phillips (BFA in Dance, 2006): Jamaican TV host, model, and beauty queen
- John F. Rathbone (Brockport Collegiate Institute), industrialist and Adjutant General of New York
- Gene Spafford (B.A. Mathematics and Computer Science, 1979), professor at Purdue University and leading computer security expert
- Elizabeth Streb (B.S. in Dance, 1972): choreographer, performer and teacher of contemporary dance
- Joe Torres (B.S. Communications), news anchor WABC-TV in NYC
- Dave Trembley (B.A. Physical Education, 1973, M.A.), former manager of the Baltimore Orioles
- Stan Van Gundy (B.S. in Physical Education, 1981): Head coach of the New Orleans Pelicans of the NBA
- Al Walker (born 1959), former basketball player and college coach, now a scout for the Detroit Pistons of the NBA
- Jessamine Chapman Williams (teaching credential, 1901), home economist and college professor
- Fannie Barrier Williams (graduated 1870), American educator, civil rights, and women's rights activist
