= Johnathan Ivy =

American basketball player (born 1992)

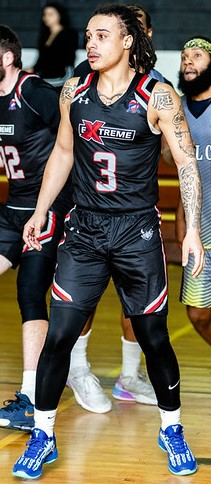

No. 3 – Buffalo eXtreme
- Position: Guard
- League: ABA

Personal information
- Born: February 3, 1992 (age 34) Rochester, New York, U.S.
- Listed height: 6 ft 1 in (1.85 m)

Career information
- High school: East (Rochester, New York)
- College: SUNY Brockport (2010–2014)
- NBA draft: 2014: undrafted
- Playing career: 2016–present

Career history
- 2016–2017: Rochester RazorSharks
- 2018: We Are D3 (TBT)
- 2019–2021: Syracuse Stallions
- 2023–2024: Rochester Kingz
- 2024–present: Buffalo eXtreme
- 2025: Rochester Kingz (TBL)

Career highlights
- All-ABA Honorable Mention (2025); PBL champion (2017); NABC Division III First Team All-American (2014); SUNYAC Player of the Year (2014); D3hoops.com East Region Player of the Year (2014)

Johnathan "John" Ivy (born February 3, 1992) is an American professional basketball player for the Buffalo eXtreme of the American Basketball Association (ABA). He played college basketball in NCAA Division III for SUNY Brockport, finishing his career as the school's all-time leading scorer, and won a Premier Basketball League (PBL) championship with the Rochester RazorSharks in 2017.

== Early life ==
Ivy was born in Rochester, New York, and attended East High School. In his senior season, East reached the New York State Public High School Athletic Association playoffs.

== College career ==
Ivy played four seasons at SUNY Brockport, where he majored in sport management. In February 2014, he broke the school's career scoring record in a win over Potsdam. Later that month he tore his anterior cruciate ligament, ending his college career with a school-record 1,683 points. He was named SUNYAC Player of the Year and D3hoops.com East Region Player of the Year. He was also named a first-team Division III All-American by the National Association of Basketball Coaches.

== Professional career ==
Ivy went undrafted in the 2014 NBA draft. He signed with the Rochester RazorSharks of the PBL in December 2016. The RazorSharks beat the Kentucky Mavericks in April 2017 to win the PBL championship.

In 2018, Ivy played for We Are D3, a team made up mostly of former Division III players, in The Basketball Tournament. The team lost in the first round.

He joined the Syracuse Stallions of the ABA in 2019 and was named an ABA All-Star. He later played for the expansion Rochester Kingz in the 2023–24 ABA season.

In September 2024, Ivy signed with the Buffalo eXtreme. He received an All-ABA honorable mention for the 2024–25 season. In 2025, he played one game for the Rochester Kingz in The Basketball League.

== Personal life ==
Ivy runs Hoop & Motivate, a youth basketball training program in Rochester, with Brandon Caruthers, who went to East High School and SUNY Brockport with him.
