= Buffalo eXtreme =

American Basketball Association team in Buffalo, New York

- Conference: East Region
- Division: White
- League: ABA
- Founded: 2023; 3 years ago
- History: Buffalo eXtreme; 2023–present
- Arena: XGen Elite Sports Complex
- Location: Buffalo, New York
- Team colors: Red, black, white
- Main sponsor: Bryant & Stratton College; Confer Plastics; Molina Healthcare
- Head coach: Ryan Gallo
- Assistant: Jonathan Clarke
- Ownership: Darren Fenn
- Conference titles: 1 (2025)
- Division titles: 1 (2025)
- Playoff appearances: 2 (2024, 2025)
- Website: www.buffaloextreme.com
Association	Icon	Holiday

The Buffalo eXtreme are a basketball team based in Buffalo, New York. The team competes in the American Basketball Association (ABA) as a member of the White Division of the East Region.

Darren Fenn owns and operates the franchise as an extension of his XGen Elite basketball academy, with home games played at XGen Elite Sports Complex in West Seneca.

In their inaugural season, the team reached the division championship game following All-ABA performances from both Javon McCrea and Marcus Feagin. They won both the division championship and region championship in their second season, advancing to the Final Four of the 2025 ABA playoffs.

Ryan Gallo replaced Richard Jacob as head coach for the club's third season.

== History ==
=== 2022: Franchise acquisition ===
Darren Fenn purchased the rights for a Buffalo franchise of the American Basketball Association (ABA) in March 2022. This is the fourth ABA franchise in the region's history, following the Buffalo Sharks, Buffalo Blue Hawks, and Western New York Thundersnow.

=== 2023–2024: Inaugural season ===
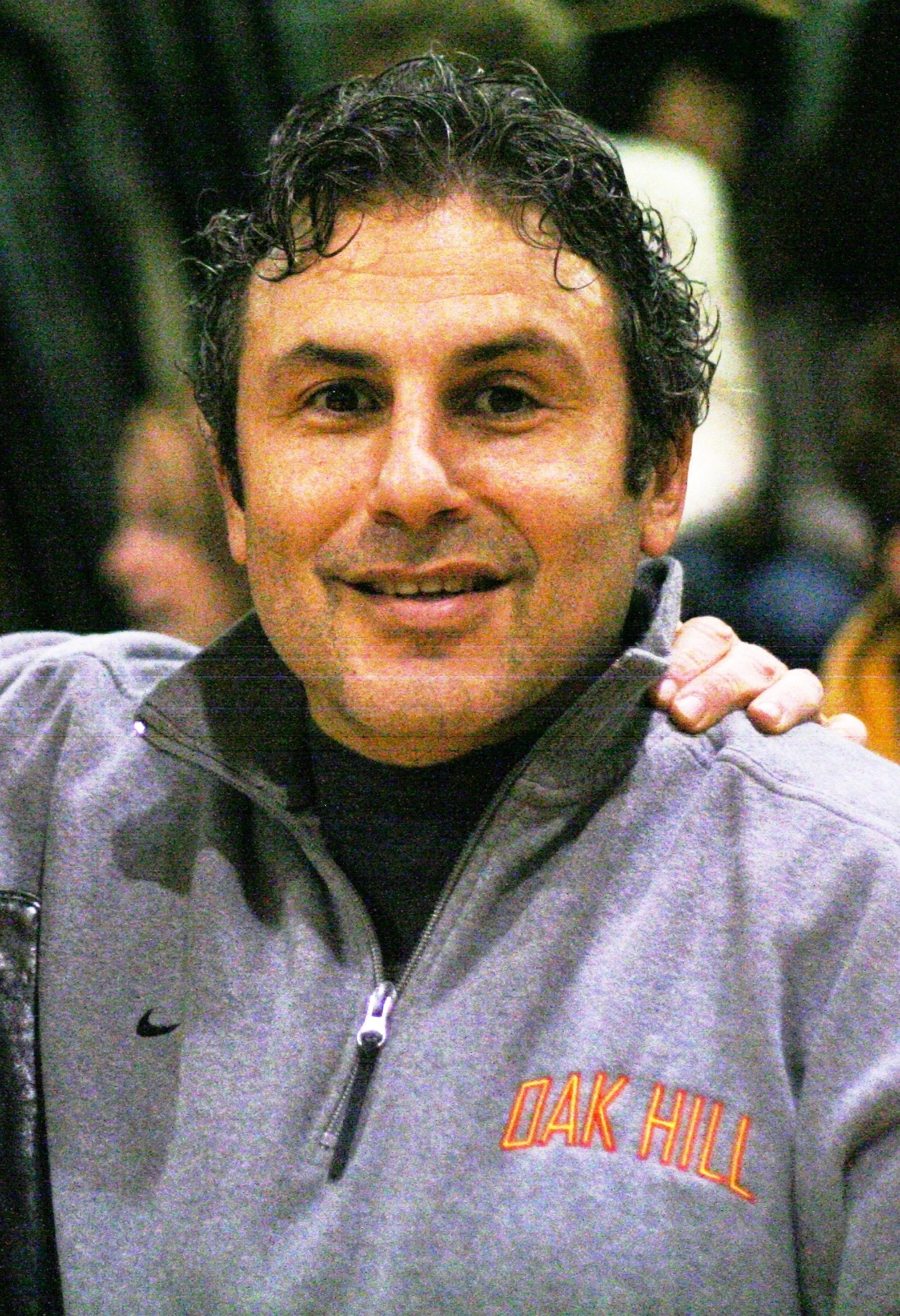
Richard Jacob, the team's head coach from 2023–2025

Tryouts for the newly named Buffalo eXtreme were announced in May 2023. Darren Fenn owns and operates XGen Elite Sports Complex in West Seneca, where the team plays its home games and gets its namesake. Under Armour designed the team uniforms, accentuating the logo's red and black color scheme.

Richard Jacob was named the team's head coach in August 2023. That same month, Bob Bateson was named associate head coach. Bateson previously coached under Jacob with the ABA's Buffalo Rapids, and later for The Park School of Buffalo where they won the 2018 New York State Class A championship.

Javon McCrea was announced as the team's first signing in October 2023. He led the team in scoring during their inaugural game, a 98–96 home victory over the Rochester Kingz on November 4, 2023. McCrea was named White Division Player of the Week after scoring 28 points with 12 rebounds and 2 assists against the Syracuse Upstate Trojans on November 11, 2023.

Marcus Feagin was named White Division Player of the Week after averaging 23 points with 24.5 rebounds and 3 assists against the Albany 518 Ballers on January 27, 2024, and the Bennington Martens on January 28, 2024.

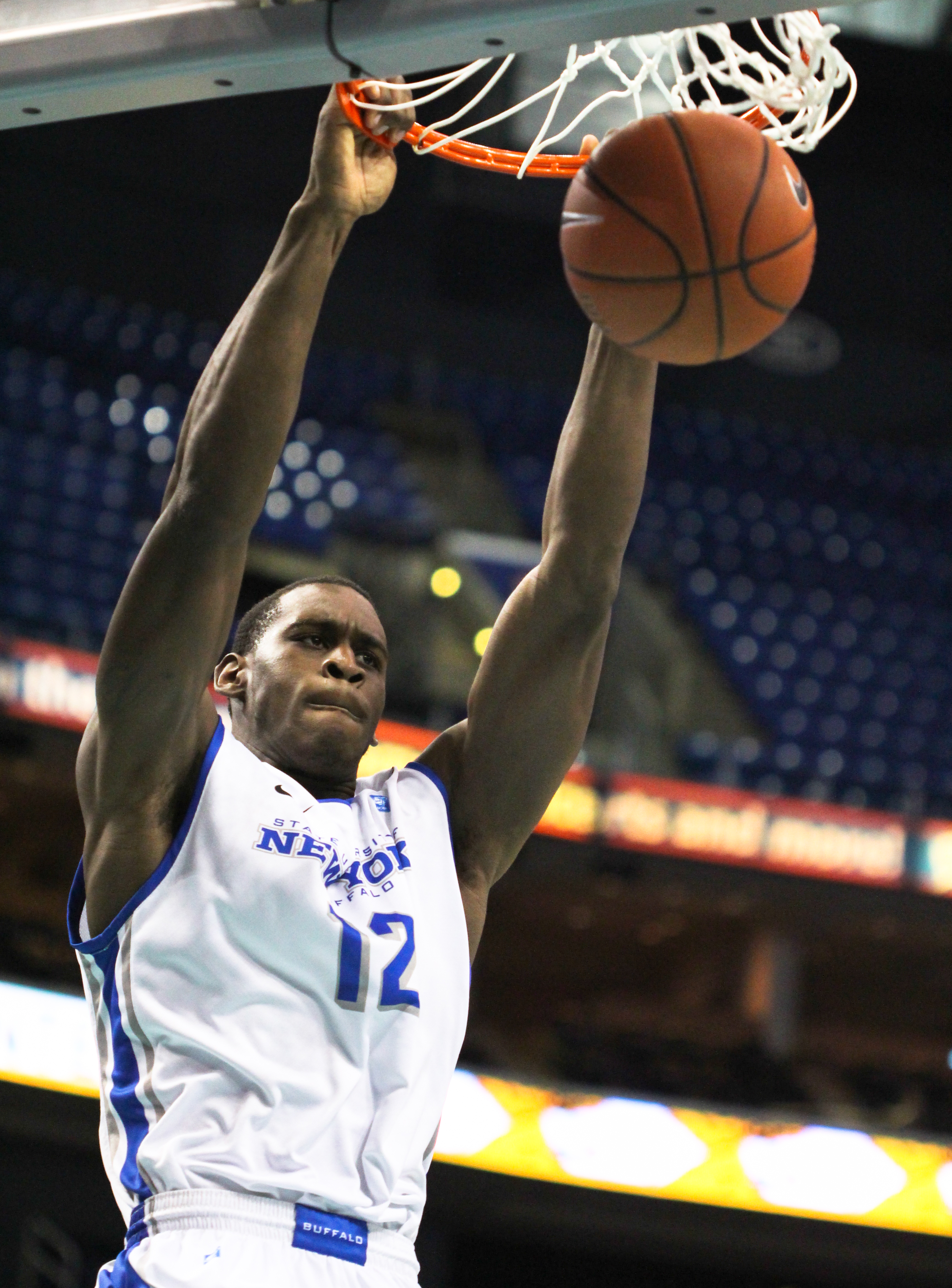
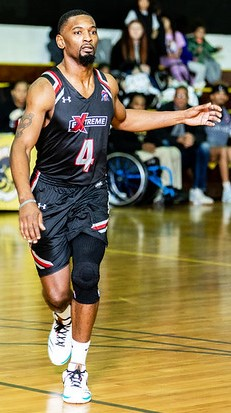
Javon McCrea (left) and Marcus Feagin, ABA All-Stars and All-ABA First Team selections in 2024

Dominick Welch was signed to the team in January 2024. He averaged 30.3 points in three games, then left to join the Montréal Toundra of the Basketball Super League.

Howard Washington was named White Division Player of the Week after averaging 27 points with 6.5 steals and 5 assists against the Binghamton Bulldogs on February 9, 2024, and the Herkimer Originals on February 10, 2024.

Marcus Feagin was named White Division Player of the Week after scoring 29 points with 25 rebounds and 2 steals against the Syracuse Upstate Trojans on February 18, 2024.

Javon McCrea and Marcus Feagin were named ABA All-Stars and All-ABA First Team selections after McCrea led the team in blocks, and Feagin led both the team and league in rebounding. Howard Washington and Quran DuBois both received All-ABA honorable mentions after Washington led the team in assists, and DuBois led the team in steals.

The team finished the 2023–24 ABA season with a 15–4 record, and was rated 18th out of 109 teams in the final ABA Power Rankings. They were awarded the #2 seed in the 2024 ABA playoffs, and defeated the visiting Rochester Kingz (#3) in a division semifinal on March 16, 2024. They went on to lose the division championship game to the Binghamton Bulldogs (#1) on March 23, 2024.

=== 2024–2025: Region champions and Final Four ===
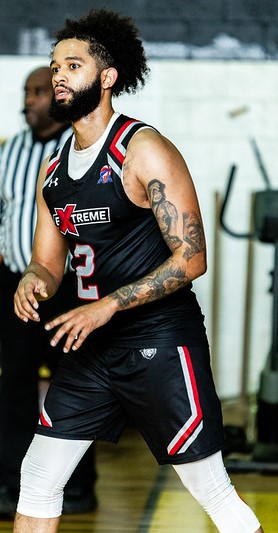
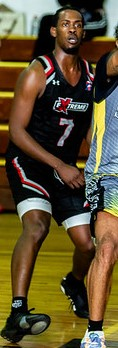
Howard Washington (left) and Quran DuBois, All-ABA Second Team selections in 2025

Seven players were retained for the team's second season, including six starters. Offseason losses included Jonathon Bailey, who left to join the Jamestown Jackals of The Basketball League. Offseason acquisitions included Pierre Sow from the Hartford Hawks, and both Johnathan Ivy and Rodney Hawkins from the Rochester Kingz.

The club started the 2024–25 ABA season on a 14–0 undefeated streak, peaking at 2nd in the ABA Power Rankings. This included home and away victories over the former ABA champion Steel City Yellow Jackets. Their first loss of the season came on the road against the also-undefeated Binghamton Bulldogs on February 1, 2025. The team avenged that loss at home the following night, handing the 12–0 Bulldogs their first defeat of the season on February 2, 2025.

Howard Washington, Marcus Feagin and Quran DuBois were named All-ABA Second Team selections after Washington led the team in assists, Feagin led both the team and league in rebounding, and DuBois led the team in scoring. Johnathan Ivy and Rodney Hawkins both received All-ABA honorable mentions after Ivy led the team in steals, and Hawkins finished second in team rebounding.

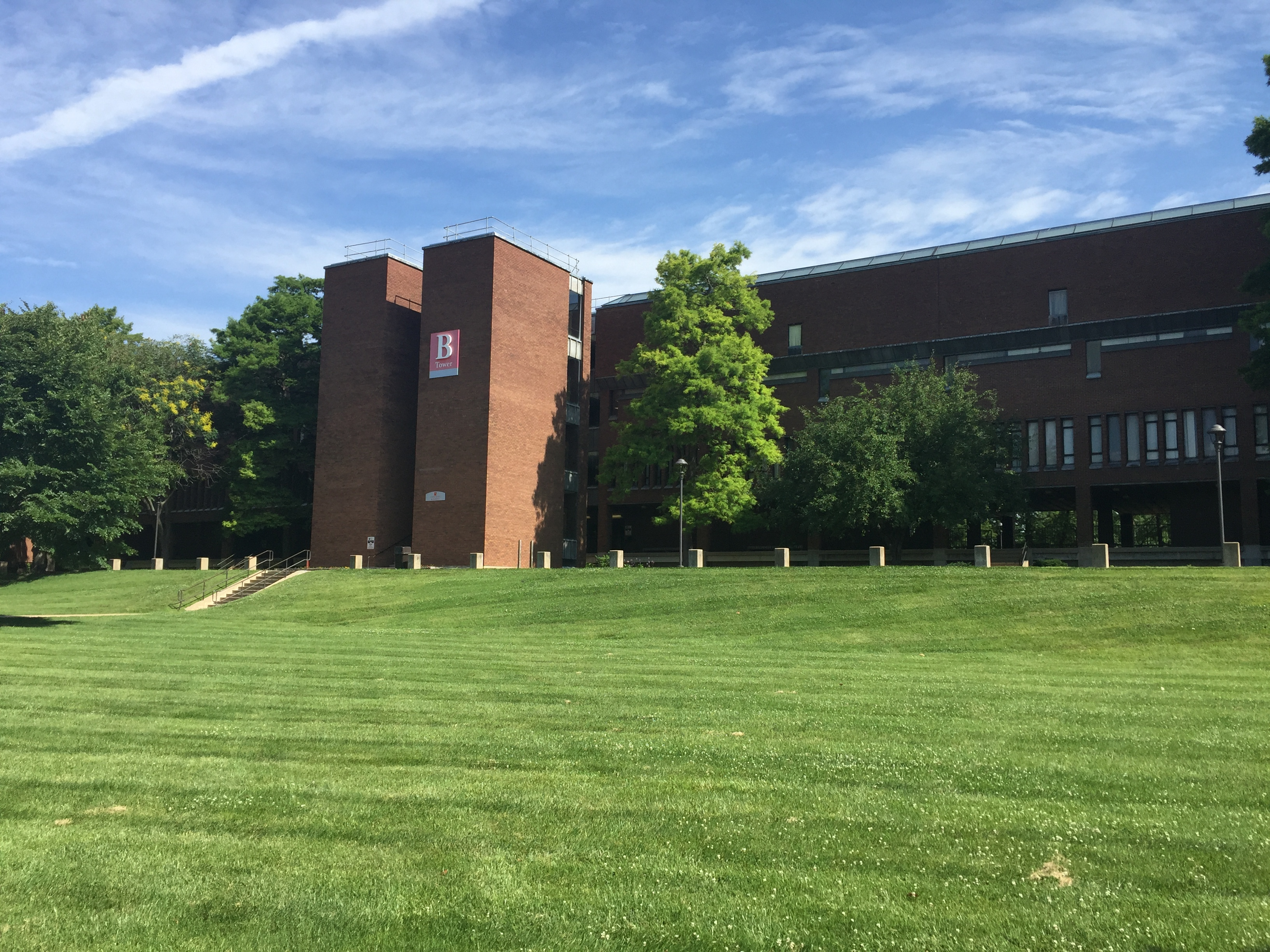
St. Louis Community College–Forest Park, host of the 2025 ABA Final Four

The team finished the 2024–25 ABA season with a 18–1 record, and was rated 4th out of 123 teams in the final ABA Power Rankings. They were awarded the #1 seed in the divisional round of the 2025 ABA playoffs, and defeated the visiting Herkimer Originals (#4) in a division semifinal on March 8, 2025. The team then defeated the Binghamton Bulldogs (#2) at home in the division championship game on March 9, 2025.

They were awarded the #1 seed in the regional round of the 2025 ABA playoffs, and defeated the visiting Wyoming Valley Clutch (#4) in a region semifinal game on March 15, 2025. The team then defeated the Jersey Express (#2) at home in the region championship game on March 16, 2025.

They were awarded the #3 seed in the Final Four of the 2025 ABA playoffs, and lost to the Silicon Valley Panthers (#2) in a league semifinal game at St. Louis Community College–Forest Park on April 4, 2025.

=== 2025–2026: Coaching change ===
Ryan Gallo was named the team's second head coach in August 2025. Gallo played for the St. Bonaventure Bonnies, and coached St. Mary's High School to the 2022 CHSAA Class B championship.

Nine players were retained for the team's third season, including eight starters. Offseason losses included both Howard Washington and Pierre Sow. Offseason acquisitions included David Blanks from the Binghamton Bulldogs, and John Dombrowski from the New Hampshire Kingz.

== Personnel ==
=== Current roster ===
Buffalo eXtreme roster
Players

Pos.	No.	Player	Height	Weight	DOB	From
G	30	David Blanks	6 ft 0 in (1.83 m)	160 lb (73 kg)	1986-08-12	Clarion
G	22	Brandon Caruthers	5 ft 9 in (1.75 m)	165 lb (75 kg)	1992-07-23	SUNY Brockport
G	35	John Dombrowski	6 ft 1 in (1.85 m)	180 lb (82 kg)	1996-10-01	Anna Maria
G	7	Quran DuBois	6 ft 3 in (1.91 m)	190 lb (86 kg)	2000-05-13	SUNY Canton
F	4	Marcus Feagin	6 ft 3 in (1.91 m)	193 lb (88 kg)	1991-07-26	Monroe CC
F	21	Alex Golda	6 ft 4 in (1.93 m)	185 lb (84 kg)	1990-08-02	Milford Academy
F	15	Rodney Hawkins	6 ft 7 in (2.01 m)	189 lb (86 kg)	1993-11-15	Pikeville
G	3	Johnathan Ivy	6 ft 1 in (1.85 m)	185 lb (84 kg)	1992-02-03	SUNY Brockport
G	1	Aaron Jones	5 ft 10 in (1.78 m)	150 lb (68 kg)	1995-11-04	NCCC
F/C	12	Javon McCrea	6 ft 7 in (2.01 m)	250 lb (113 kg)	1992-11-05	SUNY Buffalo
F/C	32	Jonathan Park	6 ft 8 in (2.03 m)	230 lb (104 kg)	2000-08-04	Nazareth
G	4	Jay Scarbrough	5 ft 9 in (1.75 m)	169 lb (77 kg)	1993-12-19	Villa Maria
F	9	Lovell Smith	6 ft 2 in (1.88 m)	169 lb (77 kg)	1995-01-04	Buffalo State

Coaches
Head coach
- Ryan Gallo
Assistant(s)
- Jonathan Clarke

Legend
- (DP) Unsigned draft pick
- (FA) Free agent
- (S) Suspended
- (R) Released
- Injured

Roster
Updated: October 19, 2025

=== Alumni ===
==== 2023–24 ====
2023–24

Buffalo eXtreme roster
Players

Pos.	No.	Player	Height	Weight	DOB	From
C	0	Jonathon Bailey	6 ft 10 in (2.08 m)	240 lb (109 kg)	1998-09-25	WLC
G	5	Jamaal Carter (injured)	6 ft 1 in (1.85 m)	189 lb (86 kg)	1994-07-26	Lindenwood
F	24	Marcellus Cooper	6 ft 5 in (1.96 m)	200 lb (91 kg)	1999-03-02	Bryant & Stratton
G	7	Quran DuBois	6 ft 3 in (1.91 m)	190 lb (86 kg)	2000-05-13	SUNY Canton
F	14	Marcus Feagin	6 ft 3 in (1.91 m)	193 lb (88 kg)	1991-07-26	Monroe CC
F	23	Alex Golda	6 ft 4 in (1.93 m)	185 lb (84 kg)	1990-08-02	Milford Academy
G	15	Breon Harris	5 ft 9 in (1.75 m)	170 lb (77 kg)	1998-10-16	Daemen
F/C	12	Javon McCrea	6 ft 7 in (2.01 m)	250 lb (113 kg)	1992-11-05	SUNY Buffalo
G	11	Jaceary Menes (R)	6 ft 0 in (1.83 m)	170 lb (77 kg)	1997-10-17	Cazenovia
F	8	Rhydeem Samedi	6 ft 2 in (1.88 m)	195 lb (88 kg)	1991-03-06	Monroe
F	11	Taylor Sanders	6 ft 3 in (1.91 m)	185 lb (84 kg)	2001-03-10	NCCC
F	9	Lovell Smith	6 ft 2 in (1.88 m)	169 lb (77 kg)	1995-01-04	Buffalo State
G	2	Howard Washington	6 ft 3 in (1.91 m)	167 lb (76 kg)	1998-03-24	Syracuse
F	8	Dominick Welch (R)	6 ft 5 in (1.96 m)	205 lb (93 kg)	1998-08-27	Alabama

Coaches
Head coach
- Richard Jacob
Assistant(s)
- Bob Bateson

Legend
- (DP) Unsigned draft pick
- (FA) Free agent
- (S) Suspended
- (R) Released
- Injured

Roster
Updated: February 19, 2024

==== 2024–25 ====
2024–25

Buffalo eXtreme roster
Players

Pos.	No.	Player	Height	Weight	DOB	From
F	14	Marcellus Cooper	6 ft 5 in (1.96 m)	200 lb (91 kg)	1999-03-02	Bryant & Stratton
G	7	Quran DuBois	6 ft 3 in (1.91 m)	190 lb (86 kg)	2000-05-13	SUNY Canton
F	4	Marcus Feagin	6 ft 3 in (1.91 m)	193 lb (88 kg)	1991-07-26	Monroe CC
F	21	Alex Golda	6 ft 4 in (1.93 m)	185 lb (84 kg)	1990-08-02	Milford Academy
F	15	Rodney Hawkins	6 ft 7 in (2.01 m)	189 lb (86 kg)	1993-11-15	Pikeville
G	3	Johnathan Ivy	6 ft 1 in (1.85 m)	185 lb (84 kg)	1992-02-03	SUNY Brockport
G	1	Aaron Jones	5 ft 10 in (1.78 m)	150 lb (68 kg)	1995-11-04	NCCC
F/C	12	Javon McCrea	6 ft 7 in (2.01 m)	250 lb (113 kg)	1992-11-05	SUNY Buffalo
F/C	32	Jonathan Park	6 ft 8 in (2.03 m)	230 lb (104 kg)	2000-08-04	Nazareth
F	9	Lovell Smith	6 ft 2 in (1.88 m)	169 lb (77 kg)	1995-01-04	Buffalo State
C	20	Pierre Sow (injured)	7 ft 0 in (2.13 m)	235 lb (107 kg)	1998-11-02	Hartford
G	2	Howard Washington	6 ft 3 in (1.91 m)	167 lb (76 kg)	1998-03-24	Syracuse

Coaches
Head coach
- Richard Jacob
Assistant(s)
- Bob Bateson

Legend
- (DP) Unsigned draft pick
- (FA) Free agent
- (S) Suspended
- (R) Released
- Injured

Roster
Updated: March 9, 2025

== Season-by-season record ==
Note: Statistics are correct as of the 2025–26 season.

ABA champions	Region champions	Division champions	Playoff berth

Season	Region	Finish	Division	Finish	Wins	Losses	Win%	GB	Playoffs	Awards	Head coach	Ref.
2023–24	East	4th	White	2nd	15	4	.789	1	Won Division semifinal (Kingz) 108–101; Lost Division final (Bulldogs) 87–106	Javon McCrea (All-Star, All-ABA); Marcus Feagin (All-Star, All-ABA)	Richard Jacob	
2024–25	East	1st	White	1st	18	1	.947	–	Won Division semifinal (Originals) 123–98; Won Division final (Bulldogs) 99–98; Won Region semifinal (Clutch) 117–95; Won Region final (Express); Lost League semifinal (Panthers) 85–93	Howard Washington (All-ABA); Marcus Feagin (All-ABA); Quran DuBois (All-ABA)	Richard Jacob	
2025–26	East	1st	White	1st	1	0	1.000	–			Ryan Gallo	

== Game log ==
=== 2023–24 ===
==== Regular season ====
2023–24 game log
Total: 15–4 (Home: 8–1; Road: 7–3)
November: 5–0 (home: 2–0; road: 3–0)

Game	Date	Team	Score	High points	High rebounds	High assists	Location Attendance	Record
1	November 4	Rochester	W 98–96	Javon McCrea (27)	Javon McCrea (14)	Howard Washington (9)	XGen Elite Sports Complex; 500	1–0
2	November 5	@ Rochester	W 105–96	Javon McCrea (31)	Marcus Feagin (18)		Roberts Wesleyan University	2–0
3	November 11	@ Syracuse	W 119–110	Javon McCrea (28)	Marcus Feagin (19)	Howard Washington (8)	Tipp Hill Community Center	3–0
4	November 12	Westchester	W 152–46	Quran DuBois (34)	Alex Golda (15)	Quran DuBois (7)	XGen Elite Sports Complex	4–0
5	November 25	@ Albany	W 163–80	Javon McCrea (33)	Javon McCrea (16)	Howard Washington (20)	Our Savior's Christian School	5–0

December: 3–2 (home: 2–1; road: 1–1)

Game	Date	Team	Score	High points	High rebounds	High assists	Location Attendance	Record
6	December 2	New Hampshire	W 130–89	Quran DuBois (35)	Marcus Feagin (21)	Howard Washington (16)	XGen Elite Sports Complex	6–0
7	December 3	Rochester	L 103–118				XGen Elite Sports Complex	6–1
8	December 16	@ Syracuse	L 123–125	Howard Washington (27)	Jonathon Bailey (14)	Howard Washington (9)	Tipp Hill Community Center	6–2
9	December 17	@ New Hampshire	W 127–86	Marcus Feagin (25)	Marcus Feagin (27)	Howard Washington (11)	Manchester Ballers' Association	7–2
10	December 30	Syracuse	W 128–124	Javon McCrea (31)	Marcus Feagin (14)	Howard Washington (11)	XGen Elite Sports Complex	8–2

January: 2–0 (home: 0–0; road: 2–0)

Game	Date	Team	Score	High points	High rebounds	High assists	Location Attendance	Record
11	January 27	@ Albany	W 148–86	Marcus Feagin (38)	Marcus Feagin (30)	Howard Washington (13)	Our Savior's Christian School	9–2
12	January 28	@ Bennington	W 117–92	Dominick Welch (35)	Marcus Feagin (19)	Howard Washington (9)	Berkshire Community College	10–2

February: 4–1 (home: 3–0; road: 1–1)

Game	Date	Team	Score	High points	High rebounds	High assists	Location Attendance	Record
13	February 3	Rochester	W 127–94	Dominick Welch (28)	Marcus Feagin (17)	Howard Washington (11)	XGen Elite Sports Complex	11–2
14	February 9	@ Binghamton	W 95–91 (OT)	Howard Washington (26)	Marcus Feagin (28)	Howard Washington (6)	Bulldogs Sports Complex	12–2
15	February 10	Herkimer	W 99–95	Howard Washington (28)	Marcus Feagin (24)	Howard Washington (4); Marcus Feagin (4)	XGen Elite Sports Complex	13–2
16	February 18	Syracuse	W 116–76	Howard Washington (26)	Marcus Feagin (25)	Quran DuBois (6)	XGen Elite Sports Complex	14–2
17	February 25	@ Rochester	L 126–129	Howard Washington (28); Quran DuBois (28)	Marcus Feagin (16)	Howard Washington (10)	Joseph C. Wilson Foundation Academy	14–3

March: 1–1 (home: 1–0; road: 0–1)

Game	Date	Team	Score	High points	High rebounds	High assists	Location Attendance	Record
18	March 2	Binghamton	W 122–81	Quran DuBois (20)	Javon McCrea (17)	Howard Washington (7)	XGen Elite Sports Complex	15–3
19	March 3	@ Herkimer	L 119–121	Javon McCrea (34)	Marcus Feagin (25)	Marcellus Cooper (8)	New York Mills High School	15–4

==== Playoffs ====
2024 playoff game log
Total: 1–1 (home: 1–0; road: 0–1)
Division Semifinals (#2 seed): 1–0 (home: 1–0; road: 0–0)

Game	Date	Team	Score	High points	High rebounds	High assists	Location Attendance	Series
1	March 16	Rochester (#3)	W 108–101	Marcellus Cooper (26)	Javon McCrea (12)	Howard Washington (8)	XGen Elite Sports Complex	1–0

Division Finals (#2 seed): 0–1 (home: 0–0; road: 0–1)

Game	Date	Team	Score	High points	High rebounds	High assists	Location Attendance	Series
1	March 23	@ Binghamton (#1)	L 87–106				Bulldogs Sports Complex	0–1

=== 2024–25 ===
==== Regular season ====
2024–25 game log
Total: 18–1 (Home: 14–0; Road: 4–1)
October: 2–0 (home: 2–0; road: 0–0)

Game	Date	Team	Score	High points	High rebounds	High assists	Location Attendance	Record
1	October 26	Rochester	W 132–99	Marcellus Cooper (27)	Marcus Feagin (20)	Howard Washington (10)	XGen Elite Sports Complex	1–0
2	October 27	Rochester	W 101–82	Howard Washington (20); Johnathan Ivy (20)	Jonathan Park (14)	Howard Washington (8)	XGen Elite Sports Complex	2–0

November: 5–0 (home: 4–0; road: 1–0)

Game	Date	Team	Score	High points	High rebounds	High assists	Location Attendance	Record
3	November 2	Erie	W (Forfeit)	–	–	–	XGen Elite Sports Complex	3–0
4	November 9	Steel City	W 95–79	Howard Washington (19); Quran DuBois (19)	Marcus Feagin (18)	Johnathan Ivy (9)	XGen Elite Sports Complex	4–0
5	November 16	Herkimer	W 133–67	Quran DuBois (24)	Alex Golda (13)	Howard Washington (11)	XGen Elite Sports Complex	5–0
6	November 23	@ Akron	W 155–101	Jonathan Park (22)	Javon McCrea (12); Rodney Hawkins (12)	Johnathan Ivy (11)	Innes Community Learning Center	6–0
7	November 30	Rochester	W 128–90	Howard Washington (24)	Marcus Feagin (15); Rodney Hawkins (15)	Howard Washington (10)	XGen Elite Sports Complex	7–0

December: 4–0 (home: 2–0; road: 2–0)

Game	Date	Team	Score	High points	High rebounds	High assists	Location Attendance	Record
8	December 7	Albany	W 131–91	Johnathan Ivy (24)	Rodney Hawkins (17)	Howard Washington (12)	XGen Elite Sports Complex	8–0
9	December 15	@ Steel City	W 113–109	Johnathan Ivy (29)	Rodney Hawkins (17)	Howard Washington (10)	A Giving Heart Community Center	9–0
10	December 22	@ Albany	W 133–89	Rodney Hawkins (31)	Rodney Hawkins (22)	Howard Washington (8)	Our Savior's Christian School	10–0
11	December 28	Saratoga	W 143–106	Quran DuBois (35)	Marcus Feagin (18)	Johnathan Ivy (10)	XGen Elite Sports Complex	11–0

January: 3–0 (home: 2–0; road: 1–0)

Game	Date	Team	Score	High points	High rebounds	High assists	Location Attendance	Record
12	January 4	New Hampshire	W 147–89	Howard Washington (27)	Marcus Feagin (15)	Howard Washington (10)	XGen Elite Sports Complex	12–0
13	January 11	Rochester	W 123–106	Howard Washington (35)	Marcus Feagin (16)	Howard Washington (8)	XGen Elite Sports Complex	13–0
14	January 18	@ Saratoga	W 134–126	Marcellus Cooper (31)	Marcus Feagin (17)	Howard Washington (8)	Saratoga Central Catholic High School	14–0

February: 4–1 (home: 4–0; road: 0–1)

Game	Date	Team	Score	High points	High rebounds	High assists	Location Attendance	Record
15	February 1	@ Binghamton	L 101–131	Howard Washington (24)	Rodney Hawkins (11)	Howard Washington (6)	Bulldogs Sports Complex	14–1
16	February 2	Binghamton	W 98–91	Quran DuBois (28)	Marcus Feagin (18)	Johnathan Ivy (7)	XGen Elite Sports Complex	15–1
17	February 8	Bennington	W (Forfeit)	–	–	–	XGen Elite Sports Complex	16–1
18	February 22	Akron	W 152–109	Marcellus Cooper (23)	Howard Washington (12)	Johnathan Ivy (11)	XGen Elite Sports Complex	17–1
19	February 23	Akron	W 110–99	Johnathan Ivy (30)	Marcus Feagin (14)	Johnathan Ivy (9)	XGen Elite Sports Complex	18–1

==== Playoffs ====
2025 playoff game log
Total: 4–1 (home: 4–0; road: 0–1)
Division Semifinals (#1 seed): 1–0 (home: 1–0; road: 0–0)

Game	Date	Team	Score	High points	High rebounds	High assists	Location Attendance	Series
1	March 8	Herkimer (#4)	W 123–98	Marcus Feagin (22)	Marcus Feagin (12)	Johnathan Ivy (10)	XGen Elite Sports Complex	1–0

Division Finals (#1 seed): 1–0 (home: 1–0; road: 0–0)

Game	Date	Team	Score	High points	High rebounds	High assists	Location Attendance	Series
1	March 9	Binghamton (#2)	W 99–98	Rodney Hawkins (19)	Marcus Feagin (14)	Johnathan Ivy (10)	XGen Elite Sports Complex	1–0

Region Semifinals (#1 seed): 1–0 (home: 1–0; road: 0–0)

Game	Date	Team	Score	High points	High rebounds	High assists	Location Attendance	Series
1	March 15	Wyoming Valley (#4)	W 117–95	Howard Washington (22)	Rodney Hawkins (19)	Howard Washington (8)	XGen Elite Sports Complex	1–0

Region Finals (#1 seed): 1–0 (home: 1–0; road: 0–0)

Game	Date	Team	Score	High points	High rebounds	High assists	Location Attendance	Series
1	March 16	Jersey (#2)	W 99–91	Javon McCrea (30)	Rodney Hawkins (16)	Johnathan Ivy (7)	XGen Elite Sports Complex	1–0

ABA Semifinals (#3 seed): 0–1 (home: 0–0; road: 0–1)

Game	Date	Team	Score	High points	High rebounds	High assists	Location Attendance	Series
1	April 4	Silicon Valley (#2)	L 85–93	Javon McCrea (29)	Javon McCrea (21)		St. Louis Community College–Forest Park	0–1

=== 2025–26 ===
==== Regular season ====
2025–26 game log
Total: 1–0 (Home: 1–0; Road: 0–0)
October: 1–0 (home: 1–0; road: 0–0)

Game	Date	Team	Score	High points	High rebounds	High assists	Location Attendance	Record
1	October 18	Rochester	W 114–91	Javon McCrea (24); Johnathan Ivy (24)	Jonathan Park (13)	Johnathan Ivy (6)	XGen Elite Sports Complex	
2	October 25	Rochester	7PM				XGen Elite Sports Complex	

November: 0–0 (home: 0–0; road: 0–0)

Game	Date	Team	Score	High points	High rebounds	High assists	Location Attendance	Record
3	November 1	New Hampshire	5PM				XGen Elite Sports Complex	
4	November 8	Chicago	5PM				XGen Elite Sports Complex	
5	November 9	Akron	6PM				XGen Elite Sports Complex	
6	November 15	Binghamton	7PM				XGen Elite Sports Complex	
7	November 16	@ Rochester	7PM				TBA	
8	November 29	Herkimer	7PM				XGen Elite Sports Complex	

December: 0–0 (home: 0–0; road: 0–0)

Game	Date	Team	Score	High points	High rebounds	High assists	Location Attendance	Record
9	December 6	Central Pennsylvania	5PM				XGen Elite Sports Complex	
10	December 13	Saratoga	7PM				XGen Elite Sports Complex	
11	December 20	Syracuse	7PM				XGen Elite Sports Complex	
12	December 27	South Bend	7PM				XGen Elite Sports Complex	

January: 0–0 (home: 0–0; road: 0–0)

Game	Date	Team	Score	High points	High rebounds	High assists	Location Attendance	Record
13	January 3	Port Huron	7PM				XGen Elite Sports Complex	
14	January 11	@ Syracuse	7PM				Magnarelli Community Center	
15	January 17	@ Akron	TBA				Innes Community Learning Center	
16	January 24	@ Steel City	TBA				A Giving Heart Community Center	

February: 0–0 (home: 0–0; road: 0–0)

Game	Date	Team	Score	High points	High rebounds	High assists	Location Attendance	Record
17	February 7	@ Binghamton	7PM				Bulldogs Sports Complex	
18	February 15	@ Central Pennsylvania	6:05PM				Main Street Gym	
19	February 21	Steel City	7PM				XGen Elite Sports Complex	
20	February 28	@ Herkimer	7PM				TBA	

March: 0–0 (home: 0–0; road: 0–0)

Game	Date	Team	Score	High points	High rebounds	High assists	Location Attendance	Record
21	March 1	@ Saratoga	3PM				North Main Street Gym	

== Player statistics ==
Legend
GP	Games played	GS	Games started	MPG	Minutes per game
FG%	Field-goal percentage	3P%	3-point field-goal percentage	FT%	Free-throw percentage
RPG	Rebounds per game	APG	Assists per game	SPG	Steals per game
BPG	Blocks per game	PPG	Points per game

=== 2023–24 ===
Regular season

Buffalo eXtreme statistics
Player	GP	GS	MPG	FG%	3P%	FT%	RPG	APG	SPG	BPG	PPG
Jonathon Bailey	17	5	–	.590	.440	.820	6.8	0.3	0.4	0.9	9.9
Jamaal Carter	6	0	–	.430	.670	1.000	3.3	4.2	1.0	0.5	6.8
Marcellus Cooper	14	13	–	.690	.290	.570	4.3	2.5	1.4	0.4	15.6
Quran DuBois	17	17	–	.560	.440	.780	3.8	4.0	2.4	0.3	20.8
Marcus Feagin	16	15	–	.600	.300	.570	18.8	2.8	2.1	0.4	16.5
Alex Golda	17	0	–	.430	.000	.550	6.4	0.4	0.3	0.3	4.6
Breon Harris	1	0	–	.000	.000	.000	0.0	0.0	0.0	0.0	0.0
Javon McCrea	15	14	–	.660	.240	.620	11.5	1.6	1.1	2.4	22.7
Jaceary Menes	8	0	–	.470	.500	.800	2.4	2.1	1.1	0.0	9.4
Rhydeem Samedi	4	0	–	.000	1.000	.000	1.0	0.0	0.0	0.0	0.8
Taylor Sanders	4	0	–	.680	.330	1.000	2.5	1.8	1.5	0.0	11.5
Lovell Smith	12	1	–	.490	.380	.580	5.5	1.5	2.1	0.8	9.8
Howard Washington	17	17	–	.440	.430	.800	5.6	9.4	1.8	0.3	18.5
Dominick Welch	3	3	–	.650	.430	.900	7.3	4.7	2.3	1.7	30.3

=== 2024–25 ===
Regular season

Buffalo eXtreme statistics
Player	GP	GS	MPG	FG%	3P%	FT%	RPG	APG	SPG	BPG	PPG
Marcellus Cooper	9	1	–	.680	.290	.840	5.1	1.0	1.1	2.9	17.0
Quran DuBois	16	16	–	.530	.420	.890	5.4	3.1	1.8	0.4	21.0
Marcus Feagin	16	8	–	.490	.270	.550	13.6	3.2	1.2	0.1	8.4
Alex Golda	15	2	–	.540	.000	.430	5.1	0.7	0.5	0.5	3.7
Rodney Hawkins	15	12	–	.520	.100	.760	11.9	2.2	1.2	1.3	16.0
Johnathan Ivy	15	14	–	.580	.360	.780	4.5	6.7	3.1	0.1	17.9
Aaron Jones	16	1	–	.550	.340	.780	1.9	1.9	1.3	0.2	8.8
Javon McCrea	13	5	–	.560	.000	.630	7.3	1.0	1.1	1.9	11.1
Jonathan Park	14	1	–	.690	.330	.600	8.4	1.1	0.9	1.8	10.9
Lovell Smith	3	0	–	.370	.000	.500	2.0	0.7	0.3	0.3	5.0
Pierre Sow	8	5	–	.530	1.000	.730	5.3	0.9	0.3	1.6	5.8
Howard Washington	15	15	–	.340	.430	.770	7.3	8.3	1.2	0.2	19.7

=== 2025–26 ===
Regular season

Buffalo eXtreme statistics
Player	GP	GS	MPG	FG%	3P%	FT%	RPG	APG	SPG	BPG	PPG
David Blanks	1	0	–		.000		1.0	0.0	2.0	0.0	0.0
John Dombrowski	1	0	–		.500		1.0	0.0	0.0	0.0	3.0
Quran DuBois	1	1	–	.500	.670	.000	2.0	2.0	1.0	1.0	12.0
Marcus Feagin	1	1	–	.500		.500	5.0	2.0	0.0	1.0	4.0
Alex Golda	1	0	–	.200		1.000	8.0	0.0	0.0	0.0	3.0
Rodney Hawkins	1	1	–	.560		1.000	12.0	2.0	1.0	1.0	11.0
Johnathan Ivy	1	1	–	1.000	.170	.780	1.0	6.0	2.0	0.0	24.0
Aaron Jones	1	0	–	.250	.330		2.0	1.0	1.0	0.0	5.0
Javon McCrea	1	1	–	.550	.500	.900	12.0	2.0	0.0	3.0	24.0
Jonathan Park	1	0	–	.560	.500	.250	13.0	0.0	0.0	3.0	14.0
Jay Scarbrough	1	0	–	.500	.000	.330	5.0	4.0	3.0	0.0	6.0
Lovell Smith	1	0	–	.670	1.000	1.000	2.0	0.0	2.0	1.0	8.0

== Rankings ==
=== 2023–24 ===
Ranking movements Legend: ██ Increase in ranking ██ Decrease in ranking — = Not ranked
	Week																		
Poll	Pre	1	2	3	4	5	6	7	8	9	10	11	12	13	14	15	16	17	Final
2023–24 ABA Power Rankings	—	18	4	4	5	9	7	15	17	13	13	13	15	11	10	8	7	14	18

=== 2024–25 ===
Ranking movements Legend: ██ Increase in ranking ██ Decrease in ranking — = Not ranked
	Week																			
Poll	Pre	1	2	3	4	5	6	7	8	9	10	11	12	13	14	15	16	17	18	Final
2024–25 ABA Power Rankings	18	—	13	11	9	4	3	2	2	2	2	2	2	2	2	2	4	4	4	4

=== 2025–26 ===
Ranking movements
	Week																			
Poll	Pre	1	2	3	4	5	6	7	8	9	10	11	12	13	14	15	16	17	18	Final
2025–26 ABA Power Rankings	4	4																		

== Media ==
External videos
- Buffalo eXtreme home game broadcasts
- 2025 ABA Final Four, Game 1

Home games are streamed live on YouTube via the Sports Fan Base Network (SFBN).

Away game broadcasts are available at the discretion of the host team, with clubs generally utilizing either Facebook Live or YouTube. Some teams paywall their games, broadcasting on Patreon or the subscription tier of SFBN.

The team's 2025 ABA Final Four appearance was streamed via Live Stream STL.
