= New York state high school boys basketball championships =

State-wide basketball tournament

The New York state high school boys basketball championships are won in the Federation Tournament of Champions, which is conducted annually by the New York State Federation of Secondary School Athletic Associations (NYSFSSAA).

NYSFSSAA logo

The tournament comprises the winners of the various high school athletic associations in New York:

- New York State Public High School Athletic Association (NYSPHSAA) (public schools outside of New York City) (which qualifies in the NYSPHSAA Tournament)
- Public Schools Athletic League (PSAL) (public schools in New York City)
- Catholic High School Athletic Association (CHSAA) (Catholic schools primarily in Buffalo, New York City, Long Island, and Westchester)
- New York State Association of Independent Schools Athletic Association (NYSAISAA)

For geographic reasons, some Catholic and independent schools in upstate New York and Long Island compete in the NYSPHSAA.

The championship games are held each March. The 2020 tournament was cancelled due to the coronavirus pandemic.

== History ==
Following a 45-year ban on high school basketball state championship tournaments in New York State, the State Education Department granted approval in 1978 for the first boys Federation tournament to be conducted on an experimental basis. The original boys tournament was named the Super Sixteen tournament, as the four associations (NYSPHSAA, PSAL, CHSAA and NYSAISAA) competed in four classes, based primarily on student-body size. The four classes were called AAA, AA, A and B in 1979. From 1981 through 2003, the four classes were called A, B, C and D. In September 2000, the tournament became known as the Federation Tournament of Champions. Beginning with the 2004 tournament, competition has been held in three classes (AA, A and B).

Following a three-year hiatus caused by the COVID pandemic, the Federation tournament returned in 2023, albeit on a smaller scale with games held at school sites around the Capital District. The tournament was put on indefinite pause after the 2023 edition: schools cited a decrease in interest from fans and media, plus a desire for athletes to start their spring sporting seasons earlier.

== Venues ==
After the first two tournaments were held in Syracuse and Rochester in 1979 and 1980, the competition moved to Glens Falls through 2010 and then to Albany. In 2015, because the Times Union Center was used for the NCAA Women's Basketball Albany Regional, the Federation tournament was held at SEFCU Arena, the home court of the University at Albany, SUNY basketball teams. The tournament moved back to Glens Falls in 2017.

Year(s)	City	Arena
1979	Syracuse	Onondaga War Memorial Arena
1980	Rochester	Rochester Community War Memorial
1981–2010	Glens Falls	Glens Falls Civic Center
2011–14	Albany	Times Union Center
2015	Albany	SEFCU Arena
2016	Albany	Times Union Center
2017–19	Glens Falls	Glens Falls Civic Center/Cool Insuring Arena

== Classifications ==
For 2015, the NYSPHSAA classification enrollment cutoffs were as follows, counting the number of 9th, 10th and 11th grade students in the previous scholastic year (enrollment is doubled for all-boys schools):

- Class AA: 910 and more
- Class A: 480-909
- Class B: 280-479

PSAL, CHSAA and NYSAISAA have their own classification systems, not tied directly to student enrollments.

A school may elect to play in a higher classification, but may not elect to play in a lower classification.

== Winners and runners up ==
Results through 2020:

Year	Class	Winner	Ass'n	Runner Up	Ass'n	W Score	RU Score	OTs
1979	AAA	St. Anthony's (South Huntington)	CHSAA	Mount Vernon	NYSPHSAA	36	34	
1979	AA	Nazareth (Brooklyn)	CHSAA	Norman Thomas (NYC)	PSAL	76	69	
1979	A	St. Agnes (NYC)	CHSAA	Cuba	NYSPHSAA	106	62	
1979	B	Bishop Neumann (Williamsville)	CHSAA	Bridgehampton	NYSPHSAA	68	65	1
1980	A	Holy Trinity (Hicksville)	CHSAA	Ward Melville (East Setauket)	NYSPHSAA	53	48	
1980	B	Tolentine (Bronx)	CHSAA	Bellport	NYSPHSAA	74	67	
1980	C	St. Dominic (Oyster Bay)	CHSAA	Lyons	NYSPHSAA	61	45	
1980	D	Bridgehampton	NYSPHSAA	Our Saviour Lutheran (Bronx)	NYSAISAA	77	73	
1981	A	Xaverian (Brooklyn)	CHSAA	Mount Vernon	NYSPHSAA	67	66	
1981	B	Malverne	NYSPHSAA	Tolentine (Bronx)	CHSAA	55	54	
1981	C	Long Island Lutheran (Brookville)	NYSAISAA	Wyandanch	NYSPHSAA	60	59	
1981	D	Our Saviour Lutheran (Bronx)	NYSAISAA	Tuckahoe	NYSPHSAA	84	54	
1982	A	Benjamin Franklin (NYC)	PSAL	Spring Valley	NYSPHSAA	56	55	
1982	B	Nottingham (Syracuse)	NYSPHSAA	St. Agnes (NYC)	CHSAA	74	69	
1982	C	Long Island Lutheran (Brookville)	NYSAISAA	Wyandanch	NYSPHSAA	68	43	
1982	D	New York Mills	NYSPHSAA	McBurney (NYC)	NYSAISAA	64	63	
1983	A	North Babylon	NYSPHSAA	Springfield Gardens	PSAL	87	73	
1983	B	Bishop Loughlin (Brooklyn)	CHSAA	Bennett (Buffalo)	NYSPHSAA	96	68	
1983	C	Charlotte (Rochester)	NYSPHSAA	Wyandanch	NYSPHSAA	88	57	
1983	D	Our Saviour Lutheran (Bronx)	NYSAISAA	Brookfield	NYSPHSAA	85	54	
1984	A	Harry S. Truman (Bronx)	PSAL	Sweet Home (Amherst)	NYSPHSAA	67	65	1
1984	B	Bennett (Buffalo)	NYSPHSAA	Holy Cross (Flushing)	CHSAA	65	57	
1984	C	Charlotte (Rochester)	NYSPHSAA	Dalton (NYC)	NYSAISAA	47	46	
1985	A	All Hallows (Bronx)	CHSAA	Binghamton	NYSPHSAA	66	63	1
1985	B	Samuel Gompers (Bronx)	PSAL	Westbury (Old Westbury)	NYSPHSAA	72	54	
1985	C	Nichols (Buffalo)	NYSAISAA	Wheatley (Old Westbury)	NYSPHSAA	74	55	
1986	A	Binghamton	NYSPHSAA	Abraham Lincoln (Brooklyn)	PSAL	79	61	
1986	B	Xaverian (Brooklyn)	CHSAA	Manhasset	NYSPHSAA	71	70	
1986	C	Nichols (Buffalo)	NYSAISAA	Wilson Magnet (Rochester)	NYSPHSAA	63	59	
1987	A	Our Saviour Lutheran (Bronx)	NYSAISAA	Archbishop Molloy (Briarwood)	CHSAA	71	61	
1987	B	Nottingham (Syracuse)	NYSPHSAA	Christ the King (Middle Village)	CHSAA	72	70	
1987	C	Trott Vocational (Niagara Falls)	NYSPHSAA	Regis (NYC)	CHSAA	57	86	
1988	A	Tolentine (Bronx)	CHSAA	Our Saviour Lutheran (Bronx)	NYSAISAA	95	69	
1988	B	La Salle (Niagara Falls)	NYSPHSAA	Samuel Gompers (Bronx)	PSAL	80	67	
1988	C	Turner-Carroll (Buffalo)	CHSAA	Stillwater	NYSPHSAA	86	87	
1989	A	Christ the King (Middle Village)	CHSAA	Adlai Stevenson (Bronx)	PSAL	80	57	
1989	B	Nazareth (Brooklyn)	CHSAA	East Hampton	NYSPHSAA	54	36	
1989	C	Lyons	NYSPHSAA	Nichols (Buffalo)	NYSAISAA	77	70	
1990	A	William Grady (Brooklyn)	PSAL	Hempstead	NYSPHSAA	78	67	
1990	B	Jamesville-DeWitt	NYSPHSAA	James Monroe (Bronx)	PSAL	72	57	
1990	C	Nichols (Buffalo)	NYSAISAA	Rensselaer	NYSPHSAA	67	89	
1991	A	Mount Vernon	NYSPHSAA	Abraham Lincoln (Brooklyn)	PSAL	59	49	
1991	B	Nottingham (Syracuse)	NYSPHSAA	Julia Richman (NYC)	PSAL	65	49	
1991	C	Watervliet	NYSPHSAA	Turner-Carroll (Buffalo)	CHSAA	82	63	
1992	A	Bishop Loughlin (Brooklyn)	CHSAA	Greece Athena (Rochester)	NYSPHSAA	68	57	
1992	B	George Fowler (Syracuse)	NYSPHSAA	St. Joseph's Collegiate Institute (Tonawanda)	CHSAA	60	59	
1992	C	Mynderse Academy (Seneca Falls)	NYSPHSAA	Regis (NYC)	CHSAA	84	91	
1993	A	St. Raymond (Bronx)	CHSAA	Walton (Bronx)	PSAL	96	81	
1993	B	Norwich	NYSPHSAA	St. Joseph's Collegiate Institute (Tonawanda)	CHSAA	75	69	
1993	C	Regis (NYC)	CHSAA	Whitney Point	NYSPHSAA	43	41	
1994	A	Rice (NYC)	CHSAA	White Plains	NYSPHSAA	82	54	
1994	B	Long Island Lutheran (Brookville)	NYSAISAA	Norwich	NYSPHSAA	71	53	
1994	C	Cardinal O'Hara (Tonawanda)	CHSAA	Bishop Ludden (Syracuse)	NYSPHSAA	77	72	
1995	A	Abraham Lincoln (Brooklyn)	PSAL	Christ the King (Middle Village)	CHSAA	55	52	
1995	B	Mount St. Michael (Bronx)	CHSAA	Francis Lewis (Fresh Meadows)	PSAL	64	39	
1995	C	Nichols (Buffalo)	NYSAISAA	Sacred Heart (Yonkers)	CHSAA	74	44	
1996	A	Rice (NYC)	CHSAA	La Salle (Niagara Falls)	NYSPHSAA	84	65	
1996	B	Peekskill	NYSPHSAA	St. Dominic (Oyster Bay)	CHSAA	62	57	1
1996	C	Buffalo Traditional	NYSPHSAA	Collegiate (NYC)	NYSAISAA	92	71	
1997	A	Long Island Lutheran (Brookville)	NYSAISAA	Paul Robeson (Brooklyn)	PSAL	53	50	
1997	B	St. Dominic (Oyster Bay)	CHSAA	Westhill (Geddes)	NYSPHSAA	53	50	
1997	C	Salesian (New Rochelle)	CHSAA	Christian Brothers Academy (DeWitt)	NYSPHSAA	65	62	
1998	A	Rice (NYC)	CHSAA	Long Island Lutheran (Brookville)	NYSAISAA	80	65	
1998	B	Westhampton Beach	NYSPHSAA	Wadleigh (NYC)	PSAL	62	51	
1998	C	Turner-Carroll (Buffalo)	CHSAA	Sidney	NYSPHSAA	68	55	
1999	A	Rice (NYC)	CHSAA	Cardozo (Bayside)	PSAL	93	65	
1999	B	Turner-Carroll (Buffalo)	CHSAA	Southampton	NYSPHSAA	66	63	
1999	C	Lawrence Woodmere Academy	NYSAISAA	Salesian (New Rochelle)	CHSAA	63	43	
2000	A	Mount Vernon	NYSPHSAA	John F. Kennedy (Bronx)	PSAL	60	58	
2000	B	St. Mary's (Manhasset)	CHSAA	Amityville	NYSPHSAA	55	49	
2000	C	Poly Prep (Brooklyn)	NYSAISAA	Buffalo Traditional	NYSPHSAA	51	50	
2001	A	St. Raymond (Bronx)	CHSAA	Schenectady	NYSPHSAA	62	49	
2001	B	Amityville Memorial	NYSPHSAA	Benjamin Banneker Academy (Brooklyn)	PSAL	91	73	
2001	C	Buffalo Traditional	NYSPHSAA	Canisius (Buffalo)	CHSAA	65	53	
2002	A	Rice (NYC)	CHSAA	Henninger (Syracuse)	NYSPHSAA	61	53	
2002	B	St. Mary's (Manhasset)	CHSAA	Amityville Memorial	NYSPHSAA	65	61	1
2002	C	Lawrence Woodmere Academy	NYSAISAA	Blind Brook (Rye Brook)	NYSPHSAA	44	39	
2003	A	Abraham Lincoln (Brooklyn)	PSAL	Christ the King (Middle Village)	CHSAA	75	73	1
2003	B	Amityville Memorial	NYSPHSAA	Chaminade (Mineola)	CHSAA	65	57	
2003	C	Brooklyn Friends	NYSAISAA	City Honors (Buffalo)	NYSPHSAA	69	68	1
2004	AA	Mount Vernon	NYSPHSAA	Abraham Lincoln (Brooklyn)	PSAL	66	52	
2004	A	Jamesville-DeWitt	NYSPHSAA	St. Joseph's Collegiate Institute (Tonawanda)	CHSAA	77	73	1
2004	B	John F. Kennedy Catholic (Somers)	NYSPHSAA	McKinley Arts (Brooklyn)	PSAL	81	61	
2004	D	Blind Brook (Rye Brook)	NYSPHSAA	Tully (Tully, NY)	PSAL	52	43	
2005	AA	Niagara Falls	NYSPHSAA	Xaverian (Brooklyn)	CHSAA	68	65	
2005	A	St. Anthony's (South Huntington)	CHSAA	Peekskill	NYSPHSAA	61	50	
2005	B	Regis (NYC)	CHSAA	Palmyra-Macedon	NYSPHSAA	64	48	
2006	AA	Mount Vernon	NYSPHSAA	Abraham Lincoln (Brooklyn)	PSAL	62	60	
2006	A	Peekskill	NYSPHSAA	Lawrence Woodmere Academy	NYSAISAA	81	75	
2006	B	Global Studies (Brooklyn)	PSAL	Blessed Sacrament (New Rochelle)	CHSAA	78	73	
2007	AA	Abraham Lincoln (Brooklyn)	PSAL	Rice (NYC)	CHSAA	68	62	
2007	A	Peekskill	NYSPHSAA	Cardinal Hayes (Bronx)	CHSAA	44	42	
2007	B	Malverne	NYSPHSAA	Blessed Sacrament (New Rochelle)	CHSAA	90	81	
2008	AA	Abraham Lincoln (Brooklyn)	PSAL	Holy Cross (Flushing)	CHSAA	86	67	
2008	A	Jamesville-DeWitt	NYSPHSAA	Long Island Lutheran (Brookville)	NYSAISAA	70	66	
2008	B	Collegiate (NYC)	NYSAISAA	St. Agnes (NYC)	CHSAA	57	44	
2009	AA	Rice (NYC)	CHSAA	Newburgh Free Academy	NYSPHSAA	70	68	1
2009	A	Long Island Lutheran (Brookville)	NYSAISAA	Jamesville-DeWitt	NYSPHSAA	68	51	
2009	B	Collegiate (NYC)	NYSAISAA	Bishop Kearney (Irondequoit)	NYSPHSAA	57	55	
2010	AA	Christ the King (Middle Village)	CHSAA	Boys and Girls (Brooklyn)	PSAL	52	49	
2010	A	Nichols (Buffalo)	CHSAA	Jamesville-DeWitt	NYSPHSAA	65	43	
2010	B	Collegiate (NYC)	NYSAISAA	Queens H.S. of Teaching	PSAL	61	41	
2011	AA	Mount Vernon	NYSPHSAA	Christ the King (Middle Village)	CHSAA	84	78	1
2011	A	Long Island Lutheran (Brookville)	NYSAISAA	St. Mary's (Manhasset)	CHSAA	78	51	
2011	B	Collegiate (NYC)	NYSAISAA	Salesian (New Rochelle)	CHSAA	48	46	
2012	AA	Boys and Girls (Brooklyn)	PSAL	Mount Vernon	NYSPHSAA	66	60	
2012	A	Long Island Lutheran (Brookville)	NYSAISAA	Harborfields (Greenlawn)	NYSPHSAA	62	61	
2012	B	Collegiate (NYC)	NYSAISAA	Bishop Ludden (Syracuse)	NYSPHSAA	62	52	
2013	AA	Christ the King (Middle Village)	CHSAA	Long Island Lutheran (Brookville)	NYSAISAA	73	64	
2013	A	Albany Academy	NYSAISAA	John Adams (Ozone Park)	PSAL	50	34	
2013	B	Monsignor Scanlan (Bronx)	CHSAA	Fannie Lou Hamer Freedom (Bronx)	PSAL	52	50	
2014	AA	Christ the King (Middle Village)	CHSAA	Long Island Lutheran (Brookville)	NYSAISAA	58	52	
2014	A	Scotia-Glenville	NYSPHSAA	Holy Trinity (Hicksville)	CHSAA	68	52	
2014	B	Westhill (Geddes)	NYSPHSAA	Regis (NYC)	CHSAA	65	46	
2015	AA	Wings Academy (Bronx)	PSAL	Christ the King (Middle Village)	CHSAA	79	73	
2015	A	Canisius (Buffalo)	CHSAA	Albany Academy	NYSAISAA	48	44	
2015	B	Park (Amherst)	CHSAA	Maspeth	PSAL	70	51	
2016	AA	Thomas Jefferson Campus (Brooklyn)	PSAL	Aquinas Institute (Rochester)	NYSPHSAA	72	65	
2016	A	Albany Academy	NYSAISAA	Elmont Memorial	NYSPHSAA	67	51	
2016	B	Collegiate (NYC)	NYSAISAA	Olean	NYSPHSAA	49	45	
2017	AA	Abraham Lincoln (Brooklyn)	PSAL	Long Island Lutheran (Brookville)	NYSAISAA	80	63	
2017	A	Albany Academy	NYSAISAA	Walton Campus (Bronx)	NYSPHSAA	76	46	
2017	B	La Salle Academy (NYC)	CHSAA	Westhill (Geddes)	NYSPHSAA	80	67	
2018	AA	Archbishop Stepinac (White Plains)	CHSAA	South Shore Campus (Brooklyn)	PSAL	88	76	
2018	A	Park (Amherst)	CHSAA	Albany Academy	NYSAISAA	59	57	
2018	B	Fannie Lou Hamer Freedom (Bronx)	PSAL	Mekeel Christian Academy (Scotia)	NYSPHSAA	74	62	
2019	AA	Long Island Lutheran (Brookville)	NYSAISAA	Christ the King (Middle Village)	CHSAA	51	31	
2019	A	Albany Academy	NYSAISAA	Frederick Douglass Academy (NYC)	PSAL	75	49	
2019	B	Glens Falls	NYSAISAA	Cardinal O'Hara (Tonawanda)	CHSAA	88	79	
2020	Cancelled, due to coronavirus pandemic							

== Championships by school ==
Results through 2020:

Rank	School	Wins	Years
1	Mount Vernon	9	1991, 2000, 2004, 2006, 2007, 2011,2012, 2017, 2022
2	Long Island Lutheran (Brookville)	8	1981, 1982, 1994, 1997, 2009, 2011, 2012, 2019
3	Collegiate (NYC)	6	2008, 2009, 2010, 2011, 2012, 2016
3	Rice (NYC)	6	1994, 1996, 1998, 1999, 2002, 2009
5	Abraham Lincoln (Brooklyn)	5	1995, 2003, 2007, 2008, 2017
5	Nichols (Buffalo)	5	1985, 1986, 1990, 1995, 2010
7	Albany Academy	4	2013, 2016, 2017, 2019
7	Christ the King (Middle Village)	4	1989, 2010, 2013, 2014
9	Jamesville-DeWitt	3	1990, 2004, 2008
9	Nottingham (Syracuse)	3	1982, 1987, 1991
9	Our Saviour Lutheran (Bronx)	3	1981, 1983, 1987
9	Peekskill	3	1996, 2006, 2007
9	Turner-Carroll (Buffalo)	3	1988, 1998, 1999

== Championships by association ==
Results through 2020:

Rank	Association	Wins
1	CHSAA	45
2	NYSPHSAA	40
3	NYSAISAA	29
4	PSAL	14

== See also ==
- List of New York state high school league conferences
