= 2019 New York state high school boys basketball championships =

The 2019 Federation Tournament of Champions took place at the Cool Insuring Arena in Glens Falls on March 22, 23 and 24, 2019. Federation championships were awarded in the AA, A and B classifications. Long Island Lutheran in Brookville won the Class AA championship. Andre Curbelo of Long Island Lutheran was named the Class AA tournament's most valuable player. Joseph Girard III of Glens Falls was named the Class B tournament's most valuable player and finished his high school basketball career with a state-record 4,763 points.

== Class AA ==
Participating teams, results and individual honors in Class AA were as follows:

=== Participating teams ===
Association	Team	Record	Appearance	Last appearance	How qualified
CHSAA	Christ the King (Middle Village)	19-10	11	2015	Defeated Archbishop Stepinac (White Plains), 61-56
NYSAISAA	Long Island Lutheran (Brookville)	23-2	31	2018	Only Class AA school in association
NYSPHSAA	West Genesee (Camillus)	22-4	1	(first)	Defeated Brentwood, 70-57
PSAL	South Shore Campus (Brooklyn)	27-5	2	2018	Defeated Thomas Jefferson Campus (Brooklyn), 71-70

=== Results ===
Semifinals; March 22
CHSAA	Christ the King (Middle Village)	59
NYSPHSAA	West Genesee (Camillus)	53
NYSAISAA	Long Island Lutheran (Brookville)	77
PSAL	South Shore Campus (Brooklyn)	53

Championship Game; March 23
CHSAA	Christ the King (Middle Village)	31
NYSAISAA	Long Island Lutheran (Brookville)	51

Long Island Lutheran finished the season with a 25–2 record.

=== Individual honors ===
The following players were awarded individual honors for their performances at the Federation Tournament:

==== Most Valuable Player ====
- Andre Curbelo, Long Island Lutheran

==== All-Tournament Team ====
- Jalen Celestine, Long Island Lutheran
- Moussa Cisse, Christ the King
- Essam Mostafa, Long Island Lutheran
- Kadary Richmond, South Shore Campus
- Lucas Sutherland, West Genesee

== Class A ==
Participating teams, results and individual honors in Class A were as follows:

=== Participating teams ===
Association	Team	Record	Appearance	Last appearance	How qualified
CHSAA	Park (Amherst)	25-2	3	2018	Defeated Monsignor Farrell (Staten Island), 48-47
NYSAISAA	Albany Academy	17-3	7	2018	Only Class A school in association
NYSPHSAA	Poughkeepsie	25-3	2	1995	Defeated Pittsford Mendon (Pittsford), 69-59
PSAL	Frederick Douglass Academy (NYC)	24-6	1	(first)	Defeated New Dorp (Staten Island), 59-51

=== Results ===
Semifinals; March 23
PSAL	Frederick Douglass Academy (NYC)	50
NYSPHSAA	Poughkeepsie	42
CHSAA	Park (Amherst)	56
NYSAISAA	Albany Academy	71

Championship Game; March 24
PSAL	Frederick Douglass Academy (NYC)	49
NYSAISAA	Albany Academy	75

Albany Academy finished the season with a 19–3 record.

=== Individual honors ===
The following players were awarded individual honors for their performances at the Federation Tournament:

==== Most Valuable Player ====
- August Mahoney, Albany Academy

==== All-Tournament Team ====
- Andre Jackson, Albany Academy
- Derek Jeter Mejia, Frederick Douglass Academy
- Ebuka Nnagbo, Park
- Davontrey Thomas, Poughkeepsie
- Mohamed Wague, Frederick Douglass Academy

== Class B ==
Participating teams, results and individual honors in Class B were as follows:

=== Participating teams ===
Association	Team	Record	Appearance	Last appearance	How qualified
CHSAA	Cardinal O'Hara (Tonawanda)	25-1	2	1994	Defeated Regis (NYC), 45-35
NYSAISAA	Lawrence Woodmere Academy (Woodmere)	22-4	7	2018	Defeated Dalton (NYC), 51-30
NYSPHSAA	Glens Falls	27-1	1	(first)	Defeated Lowville Academy, 75-74 (OT)
PSAL	South Bronx Prep	27-3	1	(first)	Defeated Fannie Lou Hamer Freedom (Bronx), 54-47

=== Results ===
Semifinals; March 23
PSAL	South Bronx Prep	70
NYSPHSAA	Glens Falls	77 (OT)
CHSAA	Cardinal O'Hara (Tonawanda)	48
NYSAISAA	Lawrence Woodmere Academy (Woodmere)	46

Championship Game; March 24
NYSPHSAA	Glens Falls	88
CHSAA	Cardinal O'Hara (Tonawanda)	79

Glens Falls finished the season with a 29–1 record.

=== Individual honors ===
The following players were awarded individual honors for their performances at the Federation Tournament:

==== Most Valuable Player ====
- Joseph Girard III, Glens Falls

==== All-Tournament Team ====
- Jordan Agyemang, South Bronx Prep
- Trent Girard, Glens Falls
- Justin Hemphill, Cardinal O'Hara
- Haakim Siner, Cardinal O'Hara
- Tyler Saint-Furcy, Lawrence Woodmere Academy
