= 2018 New York state high school boys basketball championships =

The 2018 Federation Tournament of Champions took place at the Cool Insuring Arena in Glens Falls on March 23, 24 and 25. Federation championships were awarded in the AA, A and B classifications. Archbishop Stepinac in White Plains won the Class AA championship. Alan Griffin of Archbishop Stepinac was named the Class AA tournament's most valuable player.

== Class AA ==
Participating teams, results and individual honors in Class AA were as follows:

=== Participating teams ===
Association	Team	Record	Appearance	Last appearance	How qualified
CHSAA	Archbishop Stepinac (White Plains)	25-5	1	(first)	Defeated Christ the King (Middle Village), 74-65
NYSAISAA	Long Island Lutheran (Brookville)	22-2	30	2017	Only Class AA school in association
NYSPHSAA	Liverpool	26-0	1	(first)	Defeated Half Hollow Hills East (Dix Hills), 71-65
PSAL	South Shore Campus (Brooklyn)	20-8	1	(first)	Defeated Cardozo (Bayside), 78-66

=== Results ===
Semifinals; March 23
NYSPHSAA	Liverpool	48
PSAL	South Shore Campus (Brooklyn)	80
NYSAISAA	Long Island Lutheran (Brookville)	72
CHSAA	Archbishop Stepinac (White Plains)	76

Championship Game; March 24
PSAL	South Shore Campus (Brooklyn)	76
CHSAA	Archbishop Stepinac (White Plains)	88

Archbishop Stepinac finished the season with a 27-5 record.

There was controversy in the Archbishop Stepinac-Long Island Lutheran semifinal game. With the score tied at 8.3 seconds remaining in the game, Long Island Lutheran called a timeout, but officials determined that the team had no timeouts remaining. Long Island Lutheran was assessed a technical foul. Archbishop Stepinac made two technical free throws to take the lead and was awarded possession of the ball. Archbishop Stepinac made two more free throws after play resumed, to win by four points. Long Island Lutheran claimed it did have one timeout remaining and protested the game, arguing that the final 8.3 seconds should be replayed. Officials acknowledged the next day that the official scorekeeper had made an error, but denied the protest.

=== Individual honors ===
The following players were awarded individual honors for their performances at the Federation Tournament:

==== Most Valuable Player ====
- Alan Griffin, Archbishop Stepinac

==== All-Tournament Team ====
- R.J. Davis, Archbishop Stepinac
- Adrian Griffin, Jr., Archbishop Stepinac
- Naz Johnson, Liverpool
- Donatas Kupšas, Long Island Lutheran
- Femi Odukale, South Shore Campus

==== Sportsmanship Award ====
- Sekou Sylla, South Shore Campus

== Class A ==
Participating teams, results and individual honors in Class A were as follows:

=== Participating teams ===
Association	Team	Record	Appearance	Last appearance	How qualified
CHSAA	Park (Amherst)	23-5	2	2015	Defeated Nazareth (Brooklyn), 65-50
NYSAISAA	Albany Academy	14-6	6	2017	Only Class A school in association
NYSPHSAA	Amityville Memorial	27-1	5	2003	Defeated Ardsley, 74-54
PSAL	Brooklyn Law and Technology	27-3	1	(first)	Defeated Theodore Roosevelt Campus (Bronx), 83-57

=== Results ===
Semifinals; March 24
CHSAA	Park (Amherst)	86
NYSPHSAA	Amityville Memorial	61
PSAL	Brooklyn Law and Technology	61
NYSAISAA	Albany Academy	83

Championship Game; March 25
CHSAA	Park (Amherst)	59
NYSAISAA	Albany Academy	57

The Park School of Buffalo finished the season with a 25-5 record.

=== Individual honors ===
The following players were awarded individual honors for their performances at the Federation Tournament:

==== Most Valuable Player ====
- Noah Hutchins, Park

==== All-Tournament Team ====
- Marcus Filen, Albany Academy
- August Mahoney, Albany Academy
- Victor Ogbo, Brooklyn Law and Technology
- Daniel Scott, Park
- Joshua Serrano, Amityville Memorial

==== Sportsmanship Award ====
- Julian Eziukwu, Park

== Class B ==
Participating teams, results and individual honors in Class B were as follows:

=== Participating teams ===
Association	Team	Record	Appearance	Last appearance	How qualified
CHSAA	Regis (NYC)	19-8	6	2014	Defeated Niagara Catholic (Niagara Falls), 64-59 (OT)
NYSAISAA	Lawrence Woodmere Academy (Woodmere)	20-5	6	2006	Defeated Collegiate (NYC), 51-44
NYSPHSAA	Mekeel Christian Academy (Scotia)	24-3	1	(first)	Defeated Seton Catholic Central (Binghamton), 42-37
PSAL	Fannie Lou Hamer Freedom (Bronx)	27-4	3	2017	Defeated Brooklyn Community Arts and Media, 61-51

=== Results ===
Semifinals; March 24
CHSAA	Regis (NYC)	50
NYSPHSAA	Mekeel Christian Academy (Scotia)	76
PSAL	Fannie Lou Hamer Freedom (Bronx)	42
NYSAISAA	Lawrence Woodmere Academy (Woodmere)	39

Championship Game; March 25
NYSPHSAA	Mekeel Christian Academy (Scotia)	62
PSAL	Fannie Lou Hamer Freedom (Bronx)	74

Fannie Lou Hamer Freedom finished the season with a 29-4 record.

=== Individual honors ===
The following players were awarded individual honors for their performances at the Federation Tournament:

==== Most Valuable Player ====
- Charles Davis, Fannie Lou Hamer Freedom

==== All-Tournament Team ====
- Liam Gallagher, Regis
- Aidan Igiehon, Lawrence Woodmere Academy
- Jordan Jackson, Mekeel Christian Academy
- Tyree Morris, Fannie Lou Hamer Freedom
- Frankie Williams, Fannie Lou Hamer Freedom

==== Sportsmanship Award ====
- Gideon Agbo, Mekeel Christian Academy
