= 2014 New York state high school boys basketball championships =

High school basketball competition

The 2014 Federation Tournament of Champions took place at the Times Union Center in downtown Albany on March 21, 22 and 23. Federation championships were awarded in the AA, A and B classifications. Christ the King in Middle Village, Queens won the Class AA championship. Andre Walker of Christ the King was named the Class AA tournament's Most Valuable Player. Scotia-Glenville in Scotia won the Class A championship. Joe Cremo was named the Class A tournament's Most Valuable Player.

== Class AA ==
Participating teams, results and individual honors in Class AA were as follows:

=== Participating teams ===
Association	Team	Record	Appearance	Last appearance	How qualified
CHSAA	Christ the King (Middle Village)	23-6	9	2013	Defeated Bishop Loughlin (Brooklyn), 72-61
NYSAISAA	Long Island Lutheran (Brookville)	20-4	26	2013	Only Class AA school in association
NYSPHSAA	Green Tech (Albany)	19-5	1	(first)	Defeated Jamestown, 54-49
PSAL	Cardozo (Bayside)	30-2	2	1999	Defeated Thomas Jefferson Campus (Brooklyn), 55-54

=== Results ===
Semifinals; March 21
NYSPHSAA	Green Tech (Albany)	52
NYSAISAA	Long Island Lutheran (Brookville)	68
CHSAA	Christ the King (Middle Village)	54
PSAL	Cardozo (Bayside)	51 (OT)

Championship Game; March 22
NYSAISAA	Long Island Lutheran (Brookville)	52
CHSAA	Christ the King (Middle Village)	58

Christ the King finished the season with a 25-6 record.

=== Individual honors ===
The following players were awarded individual honors for their performances at the Federation Tournament:

==== Most Valuable Player ====
- Andrew Walker, Christ the King

==== All-Tournament Team ====
- Rawle Alkins, Christ the King
- Chris Atkinson, Long Island Lutheran
- Adonis De La Rosa, Christ the King
- Jamil Hood, Jr., Green Tech
- Rashoud Salnave, Cardozo

==== Sportsmanship Award ====
- Robyn Missa, Christ the King

== Class A ==
Participating teams, results and individual honors in Class A were as follows:

=== Participating teams ===
Association	Team	Record	Appearance	Last appearance	How qualified
CHSAA	Holy Trinity (Hicksville)	23-6	2	1980	Defeated Xavier (NYC), 61-39
NYSAISAA	Albany Academy	14-4	2	2013	Only Class A school in association
NYSPHSAA	Scotia-Glenville	25-0	1	(first)	Defeated East (Rochester), 66-44
PSAL	WHEELS (NYC)	27-4	1	(first)	Defeated Bedford Academy (Brooklyn), 57-54

WHEELS is an acronym for Washington Heights Expeditionary Learning School.

=== Results ===
Semifinals; March 21
NYSPHSAA	Scotia-Glenville	70
NYSAISAA	Albany Academy	54
CHSAA	Holy Trinity (Hicksville)	71
PSAL	WHEELS	65

Championship Game; March 22
NYSPHSAA	Scotia-Glenville	68
CHSAA	Holy Trinity (Hicksville)	52

Scotia-Glenville finished the season with a 27-0 record.

=== Individual honors ===
The following players were awarded individual honors for their performances at the Federation Tournament:

==== Most Valuable Player ====
- Joe Cremo, Scotia-Glenville

==== All-Tournament Team ====
- Peter Alkins, Holy Trinity
- Ray Jerome, Albany Academy
- Dom LeMorta, Scotia-Glenville
- Emile Lewis, WHEELS
- Alex Sausville, Scotia-Glenville

==== Sportsmanship Award ====
- Jimmy Golaszewski, Holy Trinity

== Class B ==
Participating teams, results and individual honors in Class B were as follows:

=== Participating teams ===
Association	Team	Record	Appearance	Last appearance	How qualified
CHSAA	Regis (NYC)	17-11	5	2005	Defeated St. Mary's (Lancaster), 56-50
NYSAISAA	Dwight (NYC)	23-6	2	1998	Defeated Riverdale (Bronx), 74-55
NYSPHSAA	Westhill (Geddes)	25-0	3	2010	Defeated Olean, 93-55
PSAL	Brooklyn Community Communication, Arts and Media	30-0	1	(first)	Defeated Fannie Lou Hamer Freedom (Bronx), 47-44

=== Results ===
Semifinals; March 22
NYSPHSAA	Westhill (Geddes)	80
NYSAISAA	Dwight (NYC)	52
CHSAA	Regis (NYC)	52
PSAL	Brooklyn Community	44

Championship Game; March 23
NYSPHSAA	Westhill (Geddes)	65
CHSAA	Regis (NYC)	46

Westhill finished the season with a 27-0 record.

=== Individual honors ===
The following players were awarded individual honors for their performances at the Federation Tournament:

==== Most Valuable Player ====
- Jordan Roland, Westhill

==== All-Tournament Team ====
- Chris Benjamin, Brooklyn Community
- William Billy, Westhill
- Mike Cerone, Regis
- Pee Wee Kirkland, Dwight
- Tyler Reynolds, Westhill

==== Sportsmanship Award ====
- Luke Passanannte, Regis
