= 2013 New York state high school boys basketball championships =

The 2013 Federation Tournament of Champions took place at the Times Union Center in downtown Albany on March 22, 23 and 24. Federation championships were awarded in the AA, A and B classifications. Christ the King in Middle Village, Queens won the Class AA championship. Jon Severe of Christ the King was named the Class AA tournament's Most Valuable Player.

== Class AA ==
Participating teams, results and individual honors in Class AA were as follows:

=== Participating teams ===
Association	Team	Record	Appearance	Last appearance	How qualified
CHSAA	Christ the King (Middle Village)	25-3	8	2011	Defeated Bishop Loughlin (Brooklyn), 78-63
NYSAISAA	Long Island Lutheran (Brookville)	24-2	25	2012	Only Class AA school in association
NYSPHSAA	Bishop Kearney (Irondequoit)	17-7	2	2009	Defeated New Rochelle, 45-39
PSAL	Abraham Lincoln (Brooklyn)	26-5	11	2009	Defeated Thomas Jefferson Campus (Brooklyn), 65-52

=== Results ===
Semifinals; March 22
NYSPHSAA	Bishop Kearney (Irondequoit)	55
CHSAA	Christ the King (Middle Village)	68
PSAL	Abraham Lincoln (Brooklyn)	55
NYSAISAA	Long Island Lutheran (Brookville)	73

Championship Game; March 23
CHSAA	Christ the King (Middle Village)	73
NYSAISAA	Long Island Lutheran (Brookville)	64

Christ the King finished the season with a 27–3 record.

=== Individual honors ===
The following players were awarded individual honors for their performances at the Federation Tournament:

==== Most Valuable Player ====
- Jon Severe, Christ the King

==== All-Tournament Team ====
- Rawle Alkins, Christ the King
- Antwoine Anderson, Bishop Kearney
- Kentan Facey, Long Island Lutheran
- Malik Harmon, Christ the King
- Isaiah Whitehead, Abraham Lincoln

==== Sportsmanship Award ====
- Mical-Ryan Boyd, Long Island Lutheran

== Class A ==
Participating teams, results and individual honors in Class A were as follows:

=== Participating teams ===
Association	Team	Record	Appearance	Last appearance	How qualified
CHSAA	Nazareth (Brooklyn)	23-5	5	2012	Defeated Canisius (Buffalo), 46-40
NYSAISAA	Albany Academy	14-4	1	(first)	Only Class A school in association
NYSPHSAA	McKinley (Buffalo)	22-3	1	(first)	Defeated Burke Catholic (Goshen), 76-73 (OT)
PSAL	John Adams (Ozone Park)	24-5	1	(first)	Defeated McKee/Staten Island Technical, 52-48

=== Results ===
Semifinals; March 22
NYSPHSAA	McKinley (Buffalo)	54
PSAL	John Adams (Ozone Park)	69
CHSAA	Nazareth (Brooklyn)	40
NYSAISAA	Albany Academy	43

Championship Game; March 23
PSAL	John Adams (Ozone Park)	34
NYSAISAA	Albany Academy	50

Albany Academy finished the season with a 16–4 record.

=== Individual honors ===
The following players were awarded individual honors for their performances at the Federation Tournament:

==== Most Valuable Player ====
- Darrien White, Albany Academy

==== All-Tournament Team ====
- Marcus Jackson, Albany Academy
- Paul Johnson, John Adams
- Reyjzon Jordan, McKinley
- Jack Morrow, Albany Academy
- Samson Usilo, Nazareth

==== Sportsmanship Award ====
- Markell French, John Adams

== Class B ==
Participating teams, results and individual honors in Class B were as follows:

=== Participating teams ===
Association	Team	Record	Appearance	Last appearance	How qualified
CHSAA	Monsignor Scanlan (Bronx)	19-8	2	2002	Defeated St. Mary's (Lancaster), 44-42
NYSAISAA	Riverdale (Bronx)	20-4	2	1994	Defeated Poly Prep (Brooklyn), 67-63
NYSPHSAA	Watervliet	18-8	2	1991	Defeated Babylon, 72-60 (OT)
PSAL	Fannie Lou Hamer Freedom (Bronx)	28-3	1	(first)	Defeated George Wingate Campus (Brooklyn), 63-56

=== Results ===
Semifinals; March 23
NYSPHSAA	Watervliet	60
PSAL	Fannie Lou Hamer Freedom (Bronx)	72
CHSAA	Monsignor Scanlan (Bronx)	63
NYSAISAA	Riverdale (Bronx)	49

Championship Game; March 24
PSAL	Fannie Lou Hamer Freedom (Bronx)	50
CHSAA	Monsignor Scanlan (Bronx)	52

Monsignor Scanlan finished the season with a 21–8 record.

=== Individual honors ===
The following players were awarded individual honors for their performances at the Federation Tournament:

==== Most Valuable Player ====
- John Dewey, Monsignor Scanlan

==== All-Tournament Team ====
- Jordan Gleason, Watervliet
- Naje Green, Monsignor Scanlan
- George Pena, Monsignor Scanlan
- Thomas Ryan, Riverdale
- Isaiah Thomas, Fannie Lou Hamer Freedom

==== Sportsmanship Award ====
- Corey Morgan, Fannie Lou Hamer Freedom
