= 2015 New York state high school boys basketball championships =

The 2015 Federation Tournament of Champions took place in Albany at the SEFCU Arena, home court of the University at Albany, SUNY basketball teams, on March 27, 28 and 29. The usual Albany venue, the Times Union Center in downtown Albany, was unavailable because the venue instead hosted the NCAA Women's Basketball Albany Regional. Federation championships were awarded in the AA, A and B classifications. Wings Academy in the Bronx won the Class AA championship. Jessie Govan of Wings Academy was named the Class AA tournament's Most Valuable Player.

== Class AA ==
=== Participating teams ===
Association	Team	Record	Appearance	Last appearance	How qualified
CHSAA	Christ the King (Middle Village)	25-4	10	2014	Defeated Xaverian (Brooklyn), 59-56
NYSAISAA	Long Island Lutheran (Brookville)	19-6	27	2014	Only Class AA school in association
NYSPHSAA	Shenendehowa (Clifton Park)	25-0	2	1987	Defeated Brentwood, 76-63
PSAL	Wings Academy (Bronx)	28-2	2	2002	Defeated Cardozo (Bayside), 50-46

=== Results ===
Semifinals; March 27
NYSPHSAA	Shenendehowa (Clifton Park)	35
PSAL	Wings Academy (Bronx)	44
CHSAA	Christ the King (Middle Village)	50
NYSAISAA	Long Island Lutheran (Brookville)	44

Championship Game; March 28
PSAL	Wings Academy	79
CHSAA	Christ the King (Middle Village)	73

Wings Academy finished the season with a 30-2 record.

== Individual honors ==
The following players were awarded individual honors for their performances at the Federation Tournament:

=== Most Valuable Player ===
- Jessie Govan, Wings Academy

=== All-Tournament Team ===
- Rawle Alkins, Christ the King
- Desure Buie, Wings Academy
- Tyrone Cohen, Christ the King
- Efrain DeJesus, Wings Academy
- Devonte Green, Long Island Lutheran
- Thomas Huerter, Shenendehowa

=== Sportsmanship Award ===
- Tyrone Cohen, Christ the King

== Class A ==
=== Participating teams ===
Association	Team	Record	Appearance	Last appearance	How qualified
CHSAA	Canisius (Buffalo)	23-5	4	2001	Defeated John F. Kennedy Catholic (Somers), 65-55
NYSAISAA	Albany Academy	16-3	3	2014	Only Class A school in association
NYSPHSAA	Scotia-Glenville	26-0	2	2014	Defeated Greece Athena (Rochester), 54-49
PSAL	Springfield Gardens	26-4	3	1987	Defeated Frederick Douglass Academy (NYC), 58-54

=== Results ===
Semifinals; March 27
NYSPHSAA	Scotia-Glenville	63 (OT)
CHSAA	Canisius (Buffalo)	68
PSAL	Springfield Gardens	50
NYSAISAA	Albany Academy	61

Championship Game; March 28
CHSAA	Canisius (Buffalo)	48
NYSAISAA	Albany Academy	44

Canisius finished the season with a 25-5 record.

=== Individual honors ===
The following players were awarded individual honors for their performances at the Federation Tournament:

==== Most Valuable Player ====
- LaTerrance Reed, Canisius

==== All-Tournament Team ====
- Joel Boyce, Springfield Gardens
- Joe Cremo, Scotia-Glenville
- Josh Huffman, Canisius
- Stafford Trueheart, Canisius
- Hameir Wright, Albany Academy

==== Sportsmanship Award ====
- Rory Flaherty, Albany Academy

== Class B ==
=== Participating teams ===
Association	Team	Record	Appearance	Last appearance	How qualified
CHSAA	Park (Amherst)	20-3	1	(first)	Defeated Regis (NYC), 48-43
NYSAISAA	Dwight (NYC)	20-8	3	2014	Defeated Collegiate (NYC), 49-44
NYSPHSAA	Westhill (Geddes)	23-2	4	2014	Defeated Woodlands (Hartsdale), 70-62
PSAL	Maspeth	28-1	1	(first)	Defeated Frederick Douglass Academy III (Bronx), 57-42

=== Results ===
Semifinals; March 28
NYSPHSAA	Westhill (Geddes)	55 (OT)
CHSAA	Park (Amherst)	56
PSAL	Maspeth	51
NYSAISAA	Dwight (NYC)	50

Championship Game; March 29
CHSAA	Park (Amherst)	70
PSAL	Maspeth	51

Park finished the season with a 22-3 record.

=== Individual honors ===
The following players were awarded individual honors for their performances at the Federation Tournament:

==== Most Valuable Player ====
- Jordan Nwora, Park

==== All-Tournament Team ====
- Jeremy Bonifacio, Dwight
- Derek Cheatom, Park
- Randy Golda, Park
- Jordan Roland, Westhill
- Pablo Tamer, Maspeth

==== Sportsmanship Award ====
- Michael Bugaj, Maspeth
