= 2012 New York state high school boys basketball championships =

The 2012 Federation Tournament of Champions took place at the Times Union Center in downtown Albany on March 23, 24 and 25. Federation championships were awarded in the AA, A and B classifications. Boys and Girls in Brooklyn won the Class AA championship. Leroy Fludd of Boys and Girls was named the Class AA tournament's Most Valuable Player.

== Class AA ==
Participating teams, results and individual honors in Class AA were as follows:

=== Participating teams ===
Association	Team	Record	Appearance	Last appearance	How qualified
CHSAA	St. Raymond (Bronx)	21-9	6	2004	Defeated Holy Cross (Flushing), 66-58
NYSPHSAA	Mount Vernon	23-2	10	2011	Defeated Aquinas Institute (Rochester), 61-57
PSAL	Boys and Girls (Brooklyn)	24-6	4	2011	Defeated Thomas Jefferson Campus (Brooklyn), 71-67

=== Results ===
Semifinal; March 24			Championship Game; March 25
			NYSPHSAA	Mount Vernon	60
PSAL	Boys and Girls (Brooklyn)	66	PSAL	Boys and Girls (Brooklyn)	66
CHSAA	St. Raymond (Bronx)	54

Boys and Girls finished the season with a 26-6 record.

=== Individual honors ===
The following players were awarded individual honors for their performances at the Federation Tournament:

==== Most Valuable Player ====
- Leroy Fludd, Boys and Girls

==== All-Tournament Team ====
- Joel Angus, Boys and Girls
- Isaiah Cousins, Mount Vernon
- Daniel Dingle, St. Raymond
- Tyliek Kimbrough, Boys and Girls
- Wesley Myers, Boys and Girls

==== Sportsmanship Award ====
- Will Robinson, Mount Vernon

== Class A ==
Participating teams, results and individual honors in Class A were as follows:

=== Participating teams ===
Association	Team	Record	Appearance	Last appearance	How qualified
CHSAA	Iona Prep (New Rochelle)	25-3	2	2009	Defeated St. John the Baptist (West Islip), 64-51
NYSAISAA	Long Island Lutheran (Brookville)	21-6	24	2011	Defeated Albany Academy, 65-40
NYSPHSAA	Harborfields	22-2	1	(first)	Defeated Tappan Zee (Orangeburg), 67-58
PSAL	Brooklyn Collegiate	26-5	1	(first)	Defeated Mott Haven (Bronx), 56-53

=== Results ===
Semifinals; March 23
NYSAISAA	Long Island Lutheran (Brookville)	66
PSAL	Brooklyn Collegiate	56
NYSPHSAA	Harborfields	68
CHSAA	Iona Prep (New Rochelle)	56

Championship Game; March 24
NYSAISAA	Long Island Lutheran (Brookville)	62
NYSPHSAA	Harborfields	61

Long Island Lutheran finished the season with a 23-6 record.

=== Individual honors ===
The following players were awarded individual honors for their performances at the Federation Tournament:

==== Most Valuable Player ====
- Anthony Pate, Long Island Lutheran

==== All-Tournament Team ====
- Ryan DeNicola, Long Island Lutheran
- Kenneth Lee, Long Island Lutheran
- Ervin Mitchell, Brooklyn Collegiate
- John Patron, Harborfields
- Brandon Williams, Iona Prep

== Class B ==
Participating teams, results and individual honors in Class B were as follows:

=== Participating teams ===
Association	Team	Record	Appearance	Last appearance	How qualified
CHSAA	Nazareth (Brooklyn)	21-6	4	1989	Defeated St. Mary's (Lancaster), 57-45
NYSAISAA	Collegiate (NYC)	25-3	7	2011	Defeated Poly Prep (Brooklyn), 51-45
NYSPHSAA	Bishop Ludden (Syracuse)	22-2	2	1994	Defeated Watervliet, 43-42
PSAL	Pathways (St. Albans)	24-4	2	2011	Defeated Newcomers (Long Island City), 67-50

=== Results ===
Semifinals; March 23
NYSAISAA	Collegiate (NYC)	64
PSAL	Pathways (St. Albans)	54
NYSPHSAA	Bishop Ludden (Syracuse)	66
CHSAA	Nazareth (Brooklyn)	59

Championship Game; March 24
NYSAISAA	Collegiate (NYC)	62
NYSPHSAA	Bishop Ludden (Syracuse)	52

Collegiate finished the season with a 27-3 record. It was Collegiate's record fifth straight state title.

=== Individual honors ===
The following players were awarded individual honors for their performances at the Federation Tournament:

==== Most Valuable Player ====
- Ryan Frankel, Collegiate

==== All-Tournament Team ====
- Willie Gwathmey, Collegiate
- Ben Hackett, Bishop Ludden
- Connor Huff, Collegiate
- Samson Usilo, Nazareth
- Jordan Washington, Pathways
