= List of Buffalo metropolitan area schools =

A list of private and public schools in the Buffalo, New York, metropolitan area.

- City Honors School at Fosdick Masten Park

Amherst

- The Park School of Buffalo
- Buffalo Academy of the Sacred Heart
- Kadimah Jewish Day School
- Bryant & Stratton College
- Daemen University
- Erie Community College - North campus
- University at Buffalo - North campus
- D'Youville University

Athol Springs

- Saint Francis High School

Hamburg

- Immaculata Academy
- Frontier Central School District
- Hamburg Central School District
- Hilbert College

Kenmore

- Mount Saint Mary Academy

Lancaster

- St. Mary's High School

Orchard Park

- Bryant & Stratton College
- Erie Community College - South campus

Tonawanda

- Cardinal O'Hara High School

West Seneca

- Houghton University
