= 2017 New York state high school boys basketball championships =

The 2017 Federation Tournament of Champions took place at the Glens Falls Civic Center in Glens Falls on March 24, 25 and 26. Federation championships were awarded in the AA, A and B classifications. Abraham Lincoln in Brooklyn won the Class AA championship. Donald Cannon-Flores of Abraham Lincoln was named the Class AA tournament's Most Valuable Player.

== Class AA ==
Participating teams, results and individual honors in Class AA were as follows:

=== Participating teams ===
| Association | Team | Record | Appearance | Last appearance | How qualified |
|---|---|---|---|---|---|
| CHSAA | Cardinal Hayes (Bronx) | 21-8 | 3 | 2007 | Defeated Archbishop Molloy (Briarwood), 64-62 |
| NYSAISAA | Long Island Lutheran (Brookville) | 22-3 | 29 | 2016 | Only Class AA school in association |
| NYSPHSAA | Mount Vernon | 23-4 | 11 | 2012 | Defeated Fairport, 59-48 |
| PSAL | Abraham Lincoln (Brooklyn) | 29-3 | 12 | 2013 | Defeated Thomas Jefferson Campus (Brooklyn), 82-64 |

=== Results ===
Semifinals; March 24
NYSPHSAA | Mount Vernon | 57
NYSAISAA | Long Island Lutheran (Brookville) | 67
PSAL | Abraham Lincoln (Brooklyn) | 56
CHSAA | Cardinal Hayes (Bronx) | 47

Championship Game; March 25
NYSAISAA | Long Island Lutheran (Brookville) | 63
PSAL | Abraham Lincoln (Brooklyn) | 80

Abraham Lincoln finished the season with a 31-3 record. It was Abraham Lincoln's fifth state title, the most of any PSAL team.

=== Individual honors ===
The following players were awarded individual honors for their performances at the Federation Tournament:

==== Most Valuable Player ====
- Donald Cannon-Flores, Abraham Lincoln

==== All-Tournament Team ====
- Greg Calixte, Mount Vernon
- Chris Coalmon, Long Island Lutheran
- Donatas Kupšas, Long Island Lutheran
- Michael Reid, Abraham Lincoln
- Joe Toussaint, Cardinal Hayes

== Class A ==
Participating teams, results and individual honors in Class A were as follows:

=== Participating teams ===
| Association | Team | Record | Appearance | Last appearance | How qualified |
|---|---|---|---|---|---|
| CHSAA | Monsignor Farrell (Staten Island) | 21-6 | 1 | (first) | Defeated Chaminade (Mineola), 55-47 |
| NYSAISAA | Albany Academy | 15-5 | 5 | 2016 | Only Class A school in association |
| NYSPHSAA | Irondequoit | 25-1 | 1 | (first) | Defeated Our Lady of Lourdes (Poughkeepsie), 54-43 |
| PSAL | Walton Campus (Bronx) | 27-4 | 2 | 1993 | Defeated Brooklyn Law and Technology, 58-57 |

=== Results ===
Semifinals; March 25
NYSPHSAA | Irondequoit | 45
NYSAISAA | Albany Academy | 54
PSAL | Walton Campus (Bronx) | 46
CHSAA | Monsignor Farrell (Staten Island) | 42

Championship Game; March 26
NYSAISAA | Albany Academy | 76
PSAL | Walton Campus (Bronx) | 46

Albany Academy finished the season with a 17-5 record.

=== Individual honors ===
The following players were awarded individual honors for their performances at the Federation Tournament:

==== Most Valuable Player ====
- Hameir Wright, Albany Academy

==== All-Tournament Team ====
- Brandon Abrams, Monsignor Farrell
- Gerald Drumgoole, Irondequoit
- Louis Florimon, Walton Campus
- August Mahoney, Albany Academy
- Derek Smith, Walton Campus

==== Sportsmanship Award ====
- C.J. Mulvey, Albany Academy

== Class B ==
Participating teams, results and individual honors in Class B were as follows:

=== Participating teams ===
| Association | Team | Record | Appearance | Last appearance | How qualified |
|---|---|---|---|---|---|
| CHSAA | La Salle Academy (NYC) | 25-2 | 2 | 1997 | Defeated St. Mary’s (Lancaster), 80-52 |
| NYSAISAA | Dwight (NYC) | 20-4 | 4 | 2015 | Defeated Packer Collegiate Institute (Brooklyn), 43-40 |
| NYSPHSAA | Westhill (Geddes) | 25-1 | 5 | 2015 | Defeated Canton, 80-62 |
| PSAL | Fannie Lou Hamer Freedom (Bronx) | 28-1 | 2 | 2013 | Defeated South Bronx Prep, 61-55 |

=== Results ===
Semifinals; March 24
NYSPHSAA | Westhill (Geddes) | 72
NYSAISAA | Dwight (NYC) | 58
PSAL | Fannie Lou Hamer Freedom (Bronx) | 47
CHSAA | La Salle Academy (NYC) | 61

Championship Game; March 25
NYSPHSAA | Westhill (Geddes) | 67
CHSAA | La Salle Academy (NYC) | 80

La Salle Academy finished the season with a 27-2 record.

=== Individual honors ===
The following players were awarded individual honors for their performances at the Federation Tournament:

==== Most Valuable Player ====
- James Bouknight, La Salle Academy

==== All-Tournament Team ====
- Isaiah Allen-Smith, La Salle Academy
- Zechariah Brown, Westhill
- Sean Dadey, Westhill
- Tyree Morris, Fannie Lou Hamer Freedom
- Dajuan Piper, Dwight
