= James Bouknight =

American basketball player (born 2000)

No. 2 – Mexico City Capitanes
- Position: Shooting guard / point guard
- League: NBA G League

Personal information
- Born: September 18, 2000 (age 26) Brooklyn, New York, U.S.
- Listed height: 6 ft 4 in (1.93 m)
- Listed weight: 190 lb (86 kg)

Career information
- High school: La Salle Academy (Manhattan, New York); MacDuffie School (Granby, Massachusetts)
- College: UConn (2019–2021)
- NBA draft: 2021: 1st round, 11th overall pick
- Drafted by: Charlotte Hornets
- Playing career: 2021–present

Career history
- 2021–2024: Charlotte Hornets
- 2021–2023: →Greensboro Swarm
- 2024–2025: Rip City Remix
- 2025–present: Mexico City Capitanes
- 2026: NBA G League United

Career highlights
- FIBA Intercontinental Cup champion (2026); NBA G League Three-Point Contest Champion (2026); First-team All-Big East (2021); Third-team All-AAC (2020); AAC All-Freshman Team (2020)
- Stats at NBA.com
- Stats at Basketball Reference

James David Bouknight (/ˈbʊknaɪt/ BUUK-nyte; born September 18, 2000) is an American professional basketball player for the Mexico City Capitanes of the NBA G League. He played college basketball for the UConn Huskies and was drafted by the Charlotte Hornets with the 11th pick in the 2021 NBA draft.

== Early life ==
Bouknight grew up in Crown Heights, Brooklyn, in New York City. He played baseball for much of his childhood and started playing basketball in middle school. He began his high school career with La Salle Academy in Manhattan, New York. As a junior, Bouknight averaged 17.4 points per game, leading his team to the New York Federation Class B state championship, and was named tournament most valuable player (MVP). He earned Catholic High School Athletic Association B Division MVP and New York State Sportswriters Association Class B Player of the Year accolades.

After the season, Bouknight reclassified down and transferred to MacDuffie School in Granby, Massachusetts to gain more exposure. In his reclassified junior season, Bouknight averaged 19.3 points, five rebounds and two assists per game before suffering a season-ending torn meniscus in his left knee. After recovering, he played for the PSA Cardinals alongside Cole Anthony on the Amateur Athletic Union circuit. As a senior, Bouknight earned All-New England Preparatory School Athletic Council AA honors.

=== Recruiting ===
Bouknight was a consensus four-star recruit and was considered the 53rd-best player in the 2019 class by 247Sports. On September 18, 2018, before his senior season, he committed to play college basketball for UConn. Bouknight chose the Huskies over offers from Indiana and VCU, among others.

College recruiting
Name	Hometown	School	Height	Weight	Commit date
James Bouknight; SG	Brooklyn, NY	MacDuffie School (MA)	6 ft 4 in (1.93 m)	180 lb (82 kg)	Sep 18, 2018
James Bouknight; SG	Recruit ratings: Rivals: 247Sports: ESPN: (86)				
Overall recruit ranking: Rivals: 84 247Sports: 53 ESPN: 69
Note: In many cases, Scout, Rivals, 247Sports, On3, and ESPN may conflict in their listings of height and weight.; In these cases, the average was taken. ESPN grades are on a 100-point scale.; Sources: "UConn 2019 Basketball Commitments". Rivals.; "2019 UConn Huskies Recruiting Class". ESPN.; "2019 Team Ranking". Rivals.

== College career ==
On November 7, 2019, Bouknight was suspended for three games by UConn for allegedly fleeing a car crash on September 27. He had been charged with evading responsibility, interfering with a police officer, traveling too fast for conditions and operating a motor vehicle without a license. On February 9, 2020, Bouknight scored a freshman season-high 23 points in a 72–71 overtime win over Cincinnati. He scored 19 points in the second half and overtime and made the two game-sealing free throws. One day later, Bouknight was named American Athletic Conference (AAC) Player of the Week. On February 29, he had his first double-double of 19 points and 10 rebounds in a 84–63 victory over East Carolina. As a freshman, he averaged 13 points, 4.1 rebounds and 1.3 assists per game and was a Third Team All-AAC and All-Freshman Team selection.

At the beginning of his sophomore season, Bouknight was named to the preseason John R. Wooden Award watch list. On December 20, 2020, he scored a career-high 40 points in a 76–74 overtime loss to ninth-ranked Creighton. On January 5, 2021, he suffered an elbow injury against Marquette, and missed eight games after undergoing surgery. As a sophomore, he averaged 18.7 points and 5.7 rebounds per game, earning First Team All-Big East honors. On March 31, he declared for the 2021 NBA draft, forgoing his remaining college eligibility.

== Professional career ==
=== Charlotte Hornets / Greensboro Swarm (2021–2024) ===
Bouknight was selected with the 11th pick in the 2021 NBA draft by the Charlotte Hornets. On August 3, 2021, he officially signed with the Hornets. Bouknight made his NBA debut on October 22, 2021, in a 123–112 victory against the Cleveland Cavaliers, getting only one rebound on a minute of playing time. He scored his first NBA points on November 26, in a 133–115 victory over the Minnesota Timberwolves, scoring two free throws in four minutes. On December 10, Bouknight scored a career-high 24 points in a 124–123 win over the Sacramento Kings.

Prior to the 2022–23 season, Bouknight changed his jersey number from 5 to 2.

On February 8, 2024, Bouknight was waived by the Hornets.

=== Rip City Remix (2024–2025) ===
On October 15, 2024, Bouknight signed with the Portland Trail Blazers, but was waived the next day. On October 28, he joined the Rip City Remix.

Bouknight joined the Trail Blazers for the 2025 NBA Summer League.

== Personal life ==
=== Legal issues ===
On October 16, 2022, Bouknight was arrested by Charlotte-Mecklenburg Police for driving while intoxicated at around 1:51 a.m. He was found unconscious in a parking deck around 12:44 a.m. At the time of his arrest, he had a .40-caliber gun, a Glock 23, and a bag of Doritos. His bond was set at $2,500, and he returned to practice the following day. Prior to this incident, he had multiple speeding and reckless driving offenses. He was sentenced to a year of probation.

== Career statistics ==
Legend
GP	Games played	GS	Games started	MPG	Minutes per game
FG%	Field goal percentage	3P%	3-point field goal percentage	FT%	Free throw percentage
RPG	Rebounds per game	APG	Assists per game	SPG	Steals per game
BPG	Blocks per game	PPG	Points per game	**Bold**	Career high

=== NBA ===
Year	Team	GP	GS	MPG	FG%	3P%	FT%	RPG	APG	SPG	BPG	PPG
2021–22	Charlotte	31	0	9.8	.348	.347	**.871**	1.7	.8	.2	.0	4.6
2022–23	Charlotte	**34**	0	**15.1**	.358	.303	.667	**2.1**	**1.2**	**.4**	**.1**	**5.6**
2023–24	Charlotte	14	0	5.8	**.439**	**.433**	.500	.6	.4	.1	**.1**	3.6
Career		79	0	11.4	.363	.335	.770	1.7	.9	.3	.1	4.8

=== College ===
Year	Team	GP	GS	MPG	FG%	3P%	FT%	RPG	APG	SPG	BPG	PPG
2019–20	UConn	**28**	**16**	25.9	**.462**	**.347**	**.822**	4.1	1.3	.8	.2	13.0
2020–21	UConn	15	14	**31.7**	.447	.293	.778	**5.7**	**1.8**	**1.1**	**.3**	**18.7**
Career		43	30	27.9	.456	.320	.802	4.7	1.5	.9	.2	15.0
