= Cardinal O'Hara High School =

Cardinal O'Hara High School may refer to:

- Cardinal O'Hara High School (Springfield, Pennsylvania)
- Cardinal O'Hara High School (Tonawanda, New York)
