= 2016 New York state high school boys basketball championships =

The 2016 Federation Tournament of Champions took place at the Times Union Center in downtown Albany on March 18, 19 and 20. Federation championships were awarded in the AA, A and B classifications. Thomas Jefferson Campus in Brooklyn won the Class AA championship. Shamorie Ponds of Thomas Jefferson Campus was named the Class AA tournament's Most Valuable Player.

== Class AA ==
Participating teams, results and individual honors in Class AA were as follows:

=== Participating teams ===
Association	Team	Record	Appearance	Last appearance	How qualified
CHSAA	Xaverian (Brooklyn)	18-11	4	2005	Defeated Bishop Loughlin (Brooklyn), 59-56
NYSAISAA	Long Island Lutheran (Brookville)	22-3	28	2015	Only Class AA school in association
NYSPHSAA	Aquinas Institute (Rochester)	24-3	1	(first)	Defeated Middletown, 68-50
PSAL	Thomas Jefferson Campus (Brooklyn)	23-9	1	(first)	Defeated Abraham Lincoln (Brooklyn), 90-61

=== Results ===
Semifinals; March 18
NYSPHSAA	Aquinas Institute (Rochester)	54
CHSAA	Xaverian (Brooklyn)	43
PSAL	Thomas Jefferson Campus (Brooklyn)	69
NYSAISAA	Long Island Lutheran (Brookville)	62

Championship Game; March 19
NYSPHSAA	Aquinas Institute (Rochester)	65
PSAL	Thomas Jefferson Campus (Brooklyn)	72

Thomas Jefferson Campus finished the season with a 25-9 record.

=== Individual honors ===
The following players were awarded individual honors for their performances at the Federation Tournament:

==== Most Valuable Player ====
- Shamorie Ponds, Thomas Jefferson Campus

==== All-Tournament Team ====
- Rasheem Dunn, Thomas Jefferson Campus
- Devonte Green, Long Island Lutheran
- Jalen Pickett, Aquinas Institute
- Curtis Smith, Thomas Jefferson Campus
- Nyontay Wisseh, Xaverian

==== Sportsmanship Award ====
- Earnest Edwards, Aquinas Institute

== Class A ==
Participating teams, results and individual honors in Class A were as follows:

=== Participating teams ===
Association	Team	Record	Appearance	Last appearance	How qualified
CHSAA	Canisius (Buffalo)	26-2	5	2015	Defeated Monsignor Farrell (Staten Island), 44-41
NYSAISAA	Albany Academy	16-4	4	2015	Only Class A school in association
NYSPHSAA	Elmont Memorial	23-3	1	(first)	Defeated Troy, 57-43
PSAL	Telecommunication Arts and Technology (Brooklyn)	27-3	1	(first)	Defeated Frederick Douglass Academy (NYC), 54-51

=== Results ===
Semifinals; March 18
NYSPHSAA	Elmont Memorial	61
PSAL	Telecommunication Arts and Technology (Brooklyn)	44
CHSAA	Canisius (Buffalo)	51
NYSAISAA	Albany Academy	63

Championship Game; March 19
NYSPHSAA	Elmont Memorial	51
NYSAISAA	Albany Academy	67

Albany Academy finished the season with an 18-4 record.

=== Individual honors ===
The following players were awarded individual honors for their performances at the Federation Tournament:

==== Most Valuable Player ====
- Hameir Wright, Albany Academy

==== All-Tournament Team ====
- Sal Arena, Albany Academy
- Devin Ballour, Telecommunication Arts and Technology
- Will Bennett, Albany Academy
- Jalen Burgess, Elmont Memorial
- Stafford Trueheart, Canisius

==== Sportsmanship Award ====
- Travis Robinson-Morgan, Elmont Memorial

== Class B ==
Participating teams, results and individual honors in Class B were as follows:

=== Participating teams ===
Association	Team	Record	Appearance	Last appearance	How qualified
CHSAA	Salesian (New Rochelle)	15-12	5	2011	Defeated Nichols (Buffalo), 71-54
NYSAISAA	Collegiate (NYC)	24-5	8	2011	Defeated Poly Prep (Brooklyn), 66-31
NYSPHSAA	Olean	27-0	2	2008	Defeated Marlboro, 56-45
PSAL	KIPP NYC (Bronx)	27-2	1	(first)	Defeated Jane Addams (Bronx), 95-82

=== Results ===
Semifinals; March 19
NYSPHSAA	Olean	66
PSAL	KIPP NYC (Bronx)	65
CHSAA	Salesian (New Rochelle)	45
NYSAISAA	Collegiate (NYC)	63

Championship Game; March 20
NYSPHSAA	Olean	45
NYSAISAA	Collegiate (NYC)	49

Collegiate finished the season with a 26-5 record. The title was Collegiate's sixth, tied for second-most in state history.

=== Individual honors ===
The following players were awarded individual honors for their performances at the Federation Tournament:

==== Most Valuable Player ====
- Everett Witt, Collegiate

==== All-Tournament Team ====
- Jason Cam, Collegiate
- Davis Franks, Collegiate
- Elijah Ramadhan, Olean
- Xavier Tellez, Salesian
- Jason Valera Munoz, KIPP NYC

==== Sportsmanship Award ====
- Ben Eckstrom, Olean
