= MacDuffie School =

Prep school in Granby, Massachusetts, US

The MacDuffie School

Location
- 66 School Street; Hampshire County; Granby, Massachusetts 01033; United States; 42°16′08.20″N 72°28′25.10″W

Information
- School type: Private; Independent; day; boarding; college-preparatory school
- Motto: Veritas (Truth)
- Denomination: Nonsectarian
- Established: 1890
- Founders: John and Abigail MacDuffie
- Head of school: Phil Darrin
- Staff: 17
- Faculty: 30
- Grades: 6–12
- Gender: Co-Educational
- Enrollment: 185 (2026-2027)
- Average class size: 10
- Student to teacher ratio: 6:1
- Campus size: 250 acres
- Campus type: rural
- Colors: Maroon and White
- Song: The Magnolia Song & Summer Suns
- Sports: Basketball, Cross Country, Soccer, Competitive Swimming, Ultimate Frisbee, Tennis, Volleyball, Badminton
- Mascot: Mustang (formerly the Unicorn)
- Team name: Mustangs (formerly the Unicorns)
- Newspaper: The Magnet
- Yearbook: The Magnolia
- Tuition: Boarding: $65,300; Day: $34,650
- Website: www.macduffie.org

The MacDuffie School is a private, nonsectarian, coeducational college preparatory school for day and boarding students in grades 6–12. The school is located on over 250 acres in Granby, Massachusetts, United States, within close distance to the University of Massachusetts, and Amherst, Hampshire and Mount Holyoke colleges.

== History ==
In 1890 John and Abigail MacDuffie purchased Miss Howard’s School on Union Street, Springfield, Massachusetts. This property included the home of Samuel Bowles of the founding family of the Springfield Daily Republican which was transformed into a classroom building known as Main House. The school property once adjacent to a park designed by Frederick Law Olmsted was transformed and renamed The MacDuffie School, an all-girls college preparatory school. It was located on a 15-acre campus in the middle of Springfield's Maple Hill neighborhood of tree-lined streets, and with landscaped grounds of late 19th- and early 20th century mansions that were once homes to Springfield's leading industrialists and businessmen. Fashioned after their alma maters, MacDuffie provided young women the same access to excellence in education the MacDuffies experienced at Harvard and Radcliffe. A suffragist and believer in civil rights, Abby MacDuffie instilled a sense of curiosity about the world, equality for all, and progressive thinking in her students that remains at the school’s core today.

In 1936 their son Malcolm and his wife Margaret took over as Heads, but he chose to pursue a different career and they sold the school in 1941 at the beginning of World War II, to Ralph and Cleminette Rutenber. The Rutenbers (1941–1972) extended both the reputation of the school and the campus itself, acquiring the athletic field and several large homes on the south side of Central Street and Ames Hill Drive and constructing Rutenber Hall (the school’s main classroom/library facility) and Downing Gymnasium in 1963. Under the Rutenber’s leadership, the school enjoyed its largest enrollments in the 1960s and 70s, reaching 360 boarding and day students from all over the U.S. and abroad.

The legacy of the MacDuffie and the Rutenber years of leadership, however, lies chiefly in the intellectual ideals they instilled through their vision and care.

In 1990, the year of the MacDuffie Centennial, the school became coeducational and the traditional girls' boarding program became the Ames Hill family-style program, primarily for international students, who resided with house parents in the historic homes on Ames Hill. Under the tenure of Head Michael L. Cornog (1988–1999), the school also added a sixth grade to create a fully integrated middle school curriculum.

In December 2010 the school's board of trustees announced that the NY-based International EC LLC acquired the school's name, mission, and intellectual property. EC International moved the school from Springfield to the former St. Hyacinth Seminary campus in Granby MA, which was purchased to continue the school’s mission. Faculty, staff, and students moved to the new Granby MacDuffie campus in 2011.

On June 1, 2011, five days before graduation in the school's final year in Springfield, the school's campus on Ames Hill Drive was devastated by a rare EF3 tornado that tore through several neighborhoods in the city and surrounding towns. Many students, faculty and staff were present on the campus at the time of the tornado and while there were no injuries, the campus was severely damaged with most of its trees uprooted as well as damage to buildings.

In the fall of 2011, MacDuffie School relocated and opened in Granby where it continues to operate. Stephen Griffin was appointed as the Head of School and continues to serve as such.

The MacDuffie School now offers students a much larger campus with enhanced classroom space, boarding facilities, greater technology and athletic fields. In July 2015, MMI Holdings, a Delaware education management company, purchased EC International.

== Notable alumni ==
- Dalano Banton, NBA basketball player for the Boston Celtics
- James Bouknight, NBA basketball player for the Charlotte Hornets
- Omari Spellman, CBA basketball player for the Beijing Ducks
- Jordy Tshimanga, Mongolian Basketball League player for the Khasin Khuleguud
- Tony Tulathimutte, Writer
- Alexis Legowski, women's soccer player for Pogon Szczecin

== Sources ==
- "Academics". The MacDuffie School. The MacDuffie School. 2014. Retrieved 19 October 2015.
- "The MacDuffie School". Boarding School Review. Retrieved 2015-11-03.
- Taras, Elizabeth (27 August 2013). "Right Place, Right Time". Business West. Retrieved 19 October 2015.
