= Travis Tucker =

American football player (born 1963)

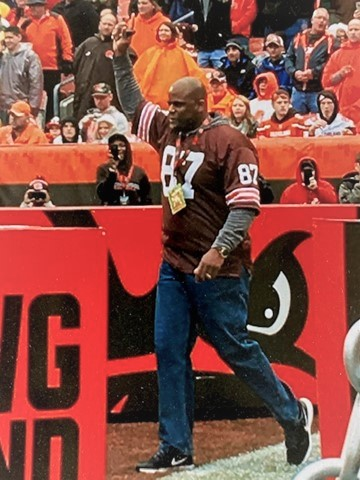
- Tucker in 2016 during 1986 Browns team reunion

No. 87
- Position: Tight end

Personal information
- Born: September 19, 1963 (age 63); Brooklyn, New York, U.S.
- Listed height: 6 ft 3 in (1.91 m)
- Listed weight: 240 lb (109 kg)

Career information
- High school: South Shore (Brooklyn)
- College: Southern Connecticut State
- NFL draft: 1985: 11th round, 287th overall pick

Career history
- Cleveland Browns (1985–1987)

Career NFL statistics
- Receptions: 4
- Receiving yards: 49
- Stats at Pro Football Reference

Travis Tyrone Tucker (born September 19, 1963) is an American former professional football player who was a tight end for three seasons for the Cleveland Browns of the National Football League (NFL). He played college football for the Southern Connecticut Owls.

== College career ==
After graduating from South Shore High School in Brooklyn, New York, Tucker was recruited by Head Coach Kevin Gilbride and played collegiate football for four years at Southern Connecticut State University, an NCAA Division II school. He was a 4-year starter and graduated as the school's all-time leading receiver in total catches, receiving yards and receiving touchdowns. He was inducted in the school's Athletic Hall of Fame in 2008.

== Professional career ==
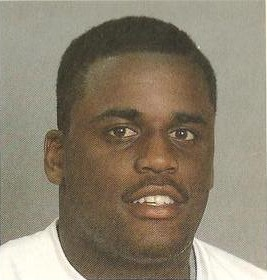

Tucker was selected by the Cleveland Browns in the 11th round of the 1985 NFL draft with the 287th overall pick. He served as a backup to Hall of Fame tight end Ozzie Newsome and was voted Special Teams Player of the Year in 1986 and Special Teams captain in 1987. His career ended in 1988 following a knee injury.
