= Glens Falls High School =

High school in Glens Falls, New York, United States

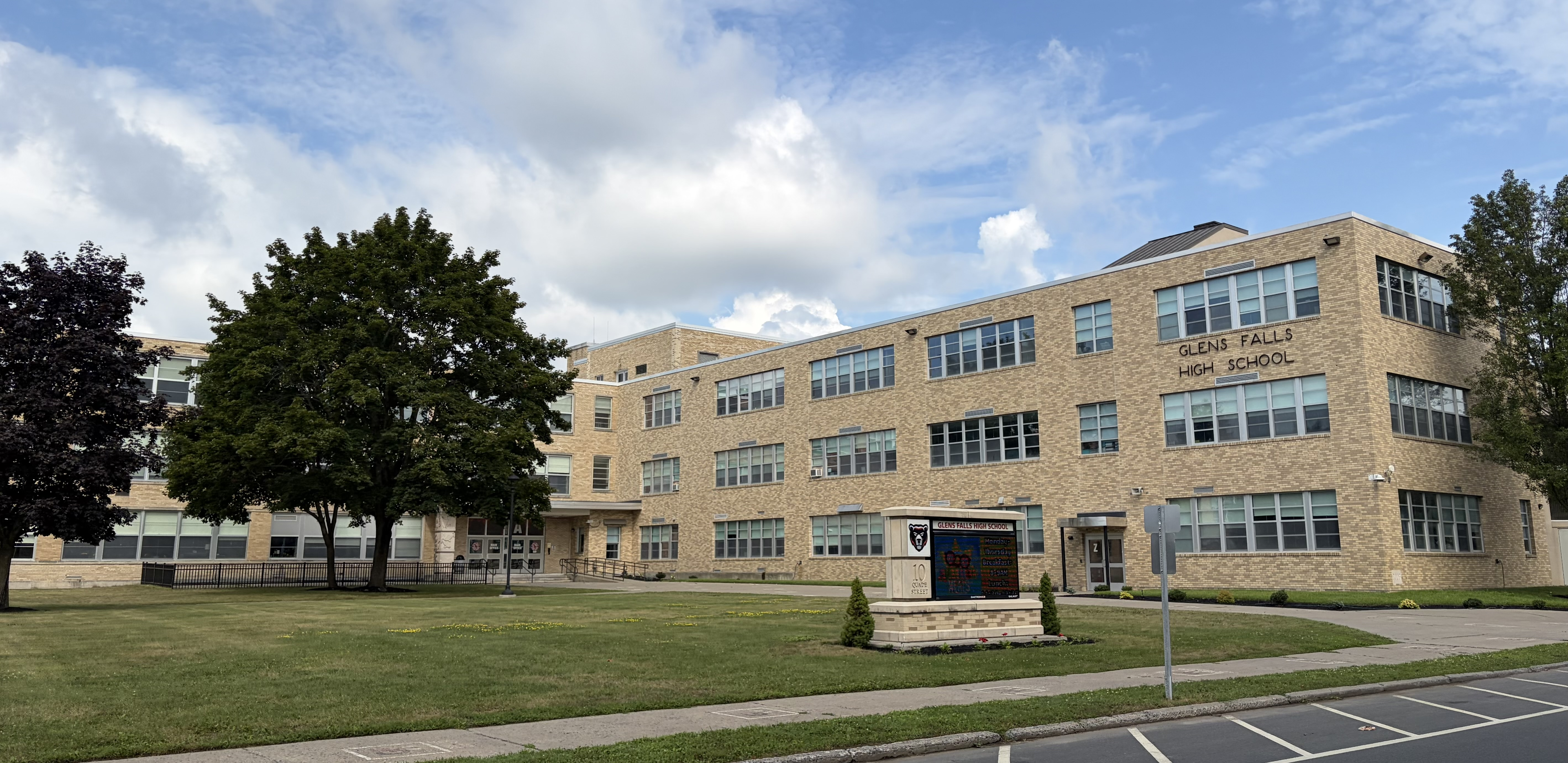
- Glens Falls High School from Quade Street in 2026

Location
- 10 Quade Street; Glens Falls, (Warren County), New York 12801; United States; 43°18′37″N 73°39′37″W

Information
- School type: Public, high school
- Motto: Excellence in Education
- School district: Glens Falls City School District
- NCES District ID: 3612240
- CEEB code: 332103
- NCES School ID: 361224000981
- Principal: Kevin Warren
- Teaching staff: 51.65 (on an FTE basis) (2023–2024)
- Grades: 9–12
- Enrollment: 622 (2023–2024)
- Student to teacher ratio: 12.04 (2023–2024)
- Colors: Red and black
- Team name: Black Bears
- Communities served: Glens Falls & Queensbury
- Website: gfsd.org
- Glens Falls High School
- U.S. National Register of Historic Places
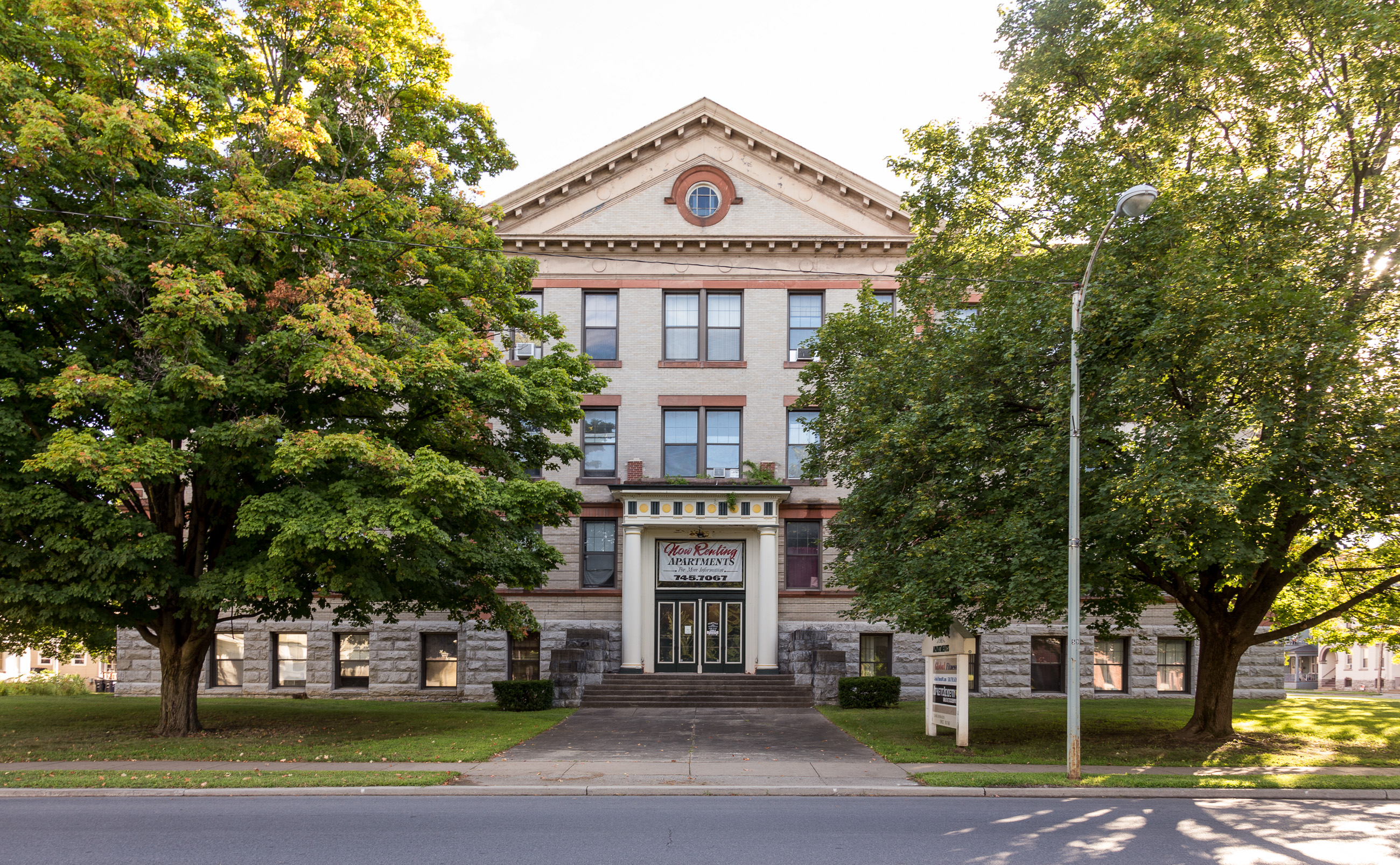
- The old school is now an apartment building

- Location within New York
- Location: 421–433 Glen St., Glens Falls, New York
- Coordinates: 43°18′50″N 73°39′04″W
- Built: 1905; 121 years ago
- Architect: Ephraim B. Potter
- Architectural style: Colonial Revival, Classical Revival
- MPS: Ephraim B. Potter Buildings TR
- NRHP reference No.: 84003335
- Added to NRHP: September 29, 1984

Glens Falls High School, abbreviated GFHS, is a high school serving the Glens Falls City School District and Glens Falls Common School District. It is located at 10 Quade Street near Sherman Avenue in Glens Falls, New York.

== History ==
The high school was formerly located at 421-433 Glen Street. That building, designed by local architect Ephraim Potter, currently an apartment complex, was listed on the National Register of Historic Places in 1984. The school has used an 'Indian' mascot since September 25, 1941 but is in the process of replacing the Native American mascot with a non-discriminatory icon following an order issued by the New York State Education Department in November 2022.

== Sports ==
Glens Falls High School has a variety of athletic programs, including basketball, lacrosse, ice hockey, soccer, track & field, football, and field hockey. Other programs include tennis, wrestling, cross country running, bowling, swimming & diving, alpine skiing, Nordic skiing, golf, softball and baseball. The GFHS athletic teams carried the name 'Glens Falls Indians' from September 25, 1941 until June 12, 2023 when the school district revealed the new name 'Glens Falls Black Bears.'

The boys' basketball team were state semi-finalists in 1999 and finalists in 2003 and 2007. In 2019 they won both the New York State Public High School Athletic Association (NYSPHSAA) state championship defeating Lowville 75–74 and the Federation title defeating Cardinal O'Hara 88-79. They also won the Class A state championship in 2024, defeating Wayne 50-37.

The girls' field hockey team were state champions in 2000 and 2001 and state finalists in 1985, 1999, and 2006. The boys' ice hockey team were state champions in 1990 and 1991. They were finalists in 2000 and semi-finalists in 1989, 2001, 2003, 2004, and 2005. The girls' basketball team were state finalists in 1985.

The Football team was a semi-finalist in 1993, and went to the state finals at the Carrier Dome for the first time in school history in 2012, where they were runners-up to the state champion, Maine-Endwell. In 2016, the team made a trip back to the Carrier Dome for another try at a state championship, this time defeating Chenango Forks 47–39 for the program's first state championship title. They won again in 2018 by defeating Batavia 55–32.

== Extracurricular activities ==
Clubs include National Honor Society, Student Government, Key Club, SLAM (Student Leadership Athletic Mentoring), Drama Club, Big Brothers/Big Sisters, AFS (American Field Service), Math Team, Rachael's Challenge, quiz team, and Prom Committee.

The high school's music programs include Symphonic Band, Jazz Band, Orchestra, Strolling Strings (a select strings group), Concert Choir, Octet (a select vocal group), Marching Band and Pep Band.

== Later start time ==
In 2012, Glens Falls High School changed their start time from 7:45 am to 8:26 am to allow for students to get more sleep. As one of the first schools in the area to do so, many studies were done to see how the later start time affected student success rate. One of the studies conducted was by St. Lawrence University, who collected data to test how the start time affected the students' sleep, health, and academic success.

== Notable alumni ==
- 'Hacksaw' Jim Duggan (born 1954) – Professional Wrestler of Mid-South, WWF, WCW & WWE fame
- Jimmer Fredette (born 1989) – professional basketball player; class of 2007
- Joseph Girard III (born 2000) – point guard for Syracuse Orange men's basketball team; class of 2019
- Dave LaPoint (born 1959) – retired Major League Baseball pitcher and 1982 World Series Champion; class of 1977
- Dave Palmer (born 1957) – retired Major League Baseball pitcher; class of 1976
- Edward C. Prescott (1940–2022) – Nobel Prize in Economics laureate, 2004; class of 1958
- Dave Strader (1955–2017) – Sportscaster most recently for the Dallas Stars; class of 1973
- Erin Whitten Hamlen (born 1971) – ice hockey goaltender and coach, who was among the first women to play professional ice hockey; class of 1989
