= La Salle Academy =

Catholic high school in New York City

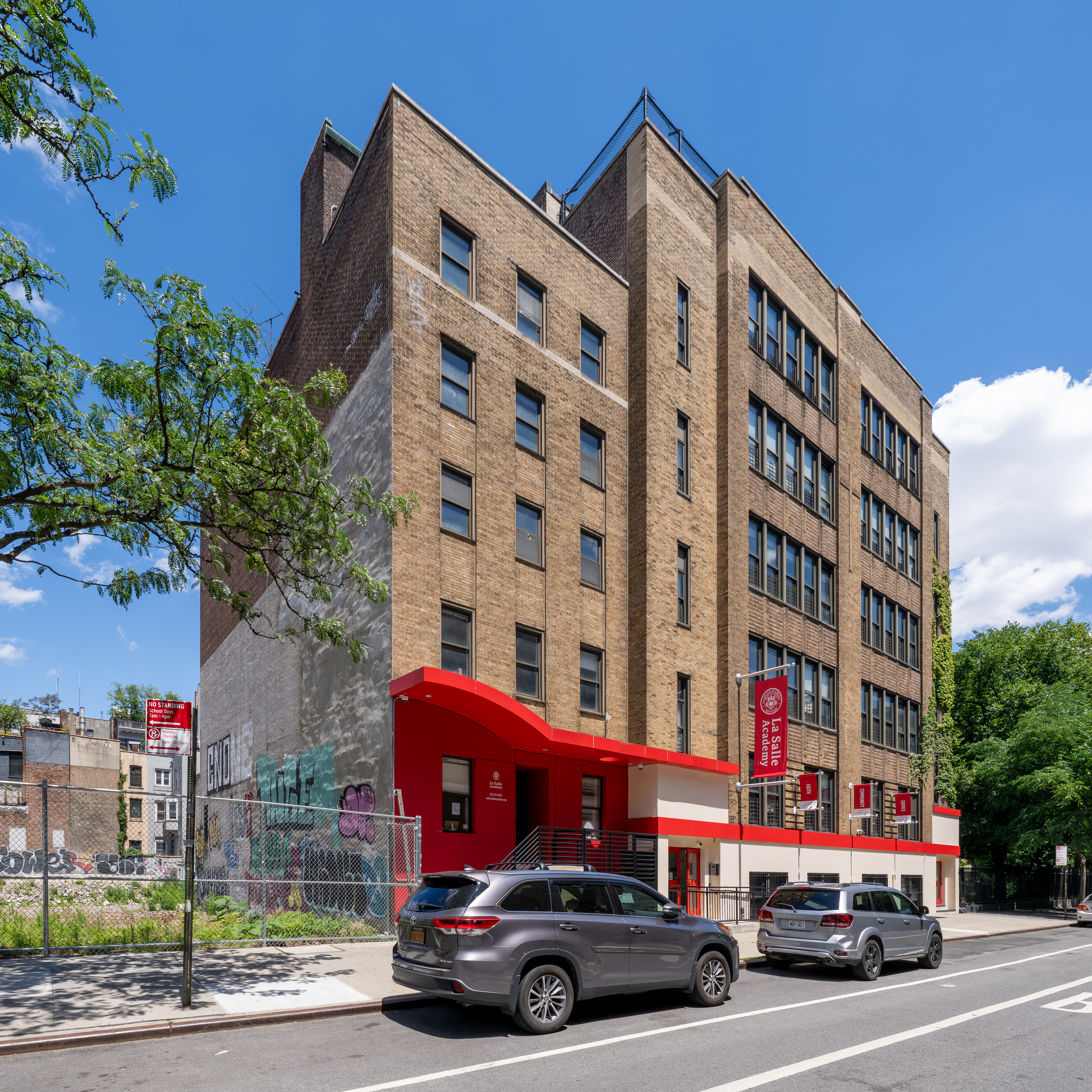

Location
- 44 East 2nd Street (East Village, Manhattan); New York City, New York; United States; 40.724874°N 73.9895779°W

Information
- Former name: St. Vincent's School (1848–1887)
- Type: Private Roman Catholic, all-boys', college-preparatory school
- Motto: Signum Fidei (Sign of Faith)
- Religious affiliations: Roman Catholic (Christian Brothers)
- Patron saint: St John Baptist de la Salle
- Established: 1848 (178 years ago)
- Founder: Institute of the Brothers of the Christian Schools
- CEEB code: 333730
- President: Candace D. Hammonds
- Chairman: Salvatore LaRocca
- Principal: Nicole Freeman
- Grades: 9–12
- Gender: Boys
- Enrollment: 217 (2025-2026)
- Average class size: 20
- Student to teacher ratio: 12 to 1
- Campus: Main campus 44 East 2nd Street
- Campus type: Urban
- Colors: Red and white
- Slogan: Educating young men since 1848
- Song: "On La Salle Men"
- Fight song: University of Wisconsin Fight Song
- Athletics conference: Catholic High School Athletic Association
- Sports: Baseball, basketball, bowling, soccer, track, volleyball
- Mascot: Cardinal
- Team name: Cardinals
- Accreditation: Middle States Association of Colleges and Schools
- Newspaper: The Cardinal
- Yearbook: The Lasallite
- Tuition: $13,200
- Director: Jerome Pannell (Director of Athletics)
- Vice Principal: Jerome Pannell (Vice Principal for Student Services)
- Website: lasalleacademy.org

La Salle Academy is an American private, Catholic all-boys' high school in the Manhattan borough of New York City, New York.

The school is run by the Eastern North American District of the Institute of the Brothers of the Christian Schools.

It was founded by the Christian Brothers in 1848.

The school was first named Saint Vincent's School when it opened on Canal Street. It moved to Second Avenue in 1856 and changed its name to La Salle Academy in 1887.

Between 2010 and 2025, the school relocated to 215 East 6th Street, sharing the building with St. George Academy. La Salle Academy moved back to its historic East 2nd Street location in September 2025.

Throughout its history, the school has been home to thousands of "Brothers' boys".

== Early years ==
The school was founded in 1848 when John Hughes, then-bishop of the Roman Catholic Archdiocese of New York, invited the Christian Brothers to establish a school in the city.

They opened St. Vincent's School in a church basement on Canal Street.

In 1856, St. Vincent's School moved to East 2nd Street and Second Avenue, a plot of land that once belonged to Washington Irving.

The brothers renamed the school La Salle Academy in 1887.

The Board of Regents of the University of the State of New York granted the school a charter in 1896.

In 1936, the brothers built a five-story building in order to accommodate increasing enrollment.

Over the first half of the 20th century, the school's enrollment grew immensely, from 98 in 1906 to 950 in 1948.

== Later 20th century ==
In 1966, the school purchased the Moskowitz and Lupowitz Restaurant on the corner of Second Avenue and 2nd Street. This became the school's annex that housed the Guidance Department, the Academic Support Center, the Art Department, Drama Club activities, Music Department and more classrooms. Today, the annex houses the offices of the President, Development, Recruitment & Admissions and the Christian Brothers' residential community.

In 1997, La Salle received accreditation from the Middle States Association of Colleges and Schools and in 1998 celebrated its 150th anniversary.

In 2000, the school was named a Blue Ribbon School by the U.S. Department of Education for excellence in education.

It received an "exceeding national expectations" evaluation in its 2018 report in fall 2017, followed by a Certificate of Accreditation in May 2018 from the Middle States Association of Colleges and Schools on Elementary and Secondary Schools accreditation team. On assessing the school's Catholic charism, the school was blessed to have been given an exceptionally positive review ("with commendation") by the Christian Brothers of the District of Eastern North America.

Dr. Catherine Guerriero became La Salle's first female president in 2014.

In 2025, the school moved back to its original location on East 2nd Street and Second Avenue after spending 15 years on 6th Street.

== Notable alumni ==
=== Athletics ===
- James Bouknight – 11th pick in the 2021 NBA draft by the Charlotte Hornets
- John Candelaria (class of 1972) – retired Major League Baseball pitcher
- Eddie Elisma (class of 1993) – former professional basketball player
- Tom Owens (class of 1967) – retired professional basketball player
- John Roche (class of 1967) – retired professional basketball player
- Metta Sandiford-Artest (formerly Ron Artest) (class of 1997) – former basketball player for various NBA teams, including the Los Angeles Lakers
- God Shammgod (formerly Shammgod Wells) (class of 1995) – basketball coach and former professional player
- Bakary Soumare (class of 2005) – retired professional soccer player who played for the Chicago Fire of Major League Soccer and the Mali national soccer team

=== Film, television and theatre ===
- Jose Ferrer (class of 1926) - Oscar for Best Actor in a Motion Picture in 1950 for Cyrano de Bergerac film
- Barnard Hughes (class of 1933) – actor

=== Religion ===
- Patrick Joseph Hayes (class of 1887) – archbishop of the Roman Catholic Archdiocese of New York
- George Mundelein (class of 1887) – archbishop of the Roman Catholic Archdiocese of Chicago

(For this reason, the school's mascot became the Cardinals.)

== See also ==
- John Baptist De La Salle
- Brothers of the Christian Schools
