= Rawle Alkins =

American l basketball player (born 1997)

- Alkins with Riesen Ludwigsburg in 2022

No. 3 – Hapoel Galil Elyon
- Positions: Small forward, guard
- League: Israeli Basketball Premier League

Personal information
- Born: October 29, 1997 (age 29) Brooklyn, New York, U.S.
- Listed height: 6 ft 5 in (1.96 m)
- Listed weight: 225 lb (102 kg)

Career information
- High school: Christ the King (Queens, New York); Word of God (Raleigh, North Carolina)
- College: Arizona (2016–2018)
- NBA draft: 2018: undrafted
- Playing career: 2018–present

Career history
- 2018–2019: Chicago Bulls
- 2018–2019: →Windy City Bulls
- 2020: FC Porto
- 2021: Raptors 905
- 2021: Gießen 46ers
- 2021–2022: Riesen Ludwigsburg
- 2022–2023: Salt Lake City Stars
- 2023–2024: Ironi Ness Ziona
- 2024: Aris Thessaloniki
- 2024–present: Hapoel Galil Elyon

Career highlights
- Pac-12 All-Freshman Team (2017)
- Stats at NBA.com
- Stats at Basketball Reference

Rawle Prince Alkins (born October 29, 1997) is an American professional basketball player for Hapoel Galil Elyon of the Israeli Basketball Premier League. He played college basketball for the Arizona Wildcats. He played in the NBA for the Chicago Bulls in 2018–19.

== High school career ==
Alkins first attended Christ the King Regional High School in Queens, New York for three years, where he led them to three New York state catholic championships. After his junior year, Alkins decided to attend Word of God Christian Academy in Raleigh, North Carolina for his senior year. As a senior, he averaged 25 points and 7 rebounds per game.

Alkins was rated as a five-star recruit and considered a top-20 recruit in the 2016 high school class. He was ranked No. 21 recruit and the 5th best small forward in the Class of 2016 by ESPN, behind Josh Jackson, Jayson Tatum, Miles Bridges, and Jonathan Isaac.

== College career ==
As a freshman, Alkins averaged 10.9 points, 4.9 rebounds and 2.1 assists per game and shot 37 percent from 3-point range. He declared for the 2017 NBA draft but opted to return to Arizona. He missed some games in January 2018 with a broken foot. As a sophomore, Alkins averaged 13.1 points, 4.8 rebounds, and 2.5 assists per game. On March 27, 2018, Alkins declared for the 2018 NBA draft and hired an agent, forgoing his final two years of college eligibility.

== Professional career ==
=== Chicago Bulls (2018–2019) ===
After going undrafted in the 2018 NBA draft, Alkins signed with the Toronto Raptors for their Summer League team.

After completing his stint there, his performances led to him signing a two-way contract with the Chicago Bulls on July 25. With this contract, he split his playing time for the season between the Chicago Bulls and their NBA G League affiliate, the Windy City Bulls. Alkins made his NBA debut on December 17, 2018, playing three minutes with a rebound and two assists in a 121–96 loss to the Oklahoma City Thunder. He made 10 NBA appearances for the Bulls, with averages of 3.7 points, 2.6 rebounds, and 1.3 assists.

He made 44 appearances in the G League with the Windy City Bulls. In those games he averaged 11.3 points, 5.5 rebounds, and 2.9 assists, primarily off the bench. Alkins, was waived at the end of the season.

Alkins was with Houston Rockets for 2019 NBA Summer League.

=== FC Porto (2020) ===
On February 26, 2020, Alkins signed with FC Porto of the Liga Portuguesa de Basquetebol (LPB). He only featured in 2 contests, due to the season suspension, and averaged 16 points, 3 rebounds, 2.5 assists, and 1 steal.

On December 4, 2020, Alkins signed with the New Orleans Pelicans of the NBA. He was waived at the end of training camp and signed by the Erie BayHawks. However, he was waived on January 26, 2021, without making an appearance for them.

=== Raptors 905 (2021) ===
On March 3, 2021, Alkins signed with the Raptors 905 of the NBA G League, the affiliate team of the NBA's Toronto Raptors. In 3 games for the 905, Alkins averaged 2.7 points, 0.3 rebounds and 0.3 steals.

=== Gießen 46ers (2021) ===
On September 3, 2021, he signed with Gießen 46ers of the Basketball Bundesliga. In two games, Alkins averaged 15 points, three rebounds, one steal and one block per game.

=== MHP Riesen Ludwigsburg (2021–2022) ===
On October 7, 2021, Alkins signed with MHP Riesen Ludwigsburg of the Basketball Bundesliga. He averaged 8.9 points and 2.3 rebounds.

=== Salt Lake City Stars (2022–2023) ===
On October 23, 2022, Alkins joined the Salt Lake City Stars training camp roster.

=== Ironi Ness Ziona (2023–2024) ===
In November 2023, Alkins signed with Ironi Ness Ziona of the Israeli Basketball Premier League.

== Personal life ==
Alkins grew up an only child with eight family members under one roof, including his mother, grandmother, aunt and uncle, all Haitians immigrants who raised him and his cousins like brothers.

== Career statistics ==
Legend
GP	Games played	GS	Games started	MPG	Minutes per game
FG%	Field goal percentage	3P%	3-point field goal percentage	FT%	Free throw percentage
RPG	Rebounds per game	APG	Assists per game	SPG	Steals per game
BPG	Blocks per game	PPG	Points per game	**Bold**	Career high

=== NBA ===
==== Regular season ====
Year	Team	GP	GS	MPG	FG%	3P%	FT%	RPG	APG	SPG	BPG	PPG
2018–19	Chicago	10	1	12.0	.333	.250	.667	2.6	1.3	.1	.0	3.7
Career		10	1	12.0	.333	.250	.667	2.6	1.3	.1	.0	3.7

=== College ===
Year	Team	GP	GS	MPG	FG%	3P%	FT%	RPG	APG	SPG	BPG	PPG
2016–17	Arizona	**37**	**36**	28.0	**.463**	**.370**	**.733**	**4.9**	2.1	.9	.5	10.9
2017–18	Arizona	23	21	**31.4**	.432	.359	.724	4.8	**2.5**	**1.3**	**.7**	**13.1**
Career		60	57	29.3	.450	.365	.729	4.9	2.2	1.0	.6	11.8
