= South Shore High School (Brooklyn) =

Public school in New York City

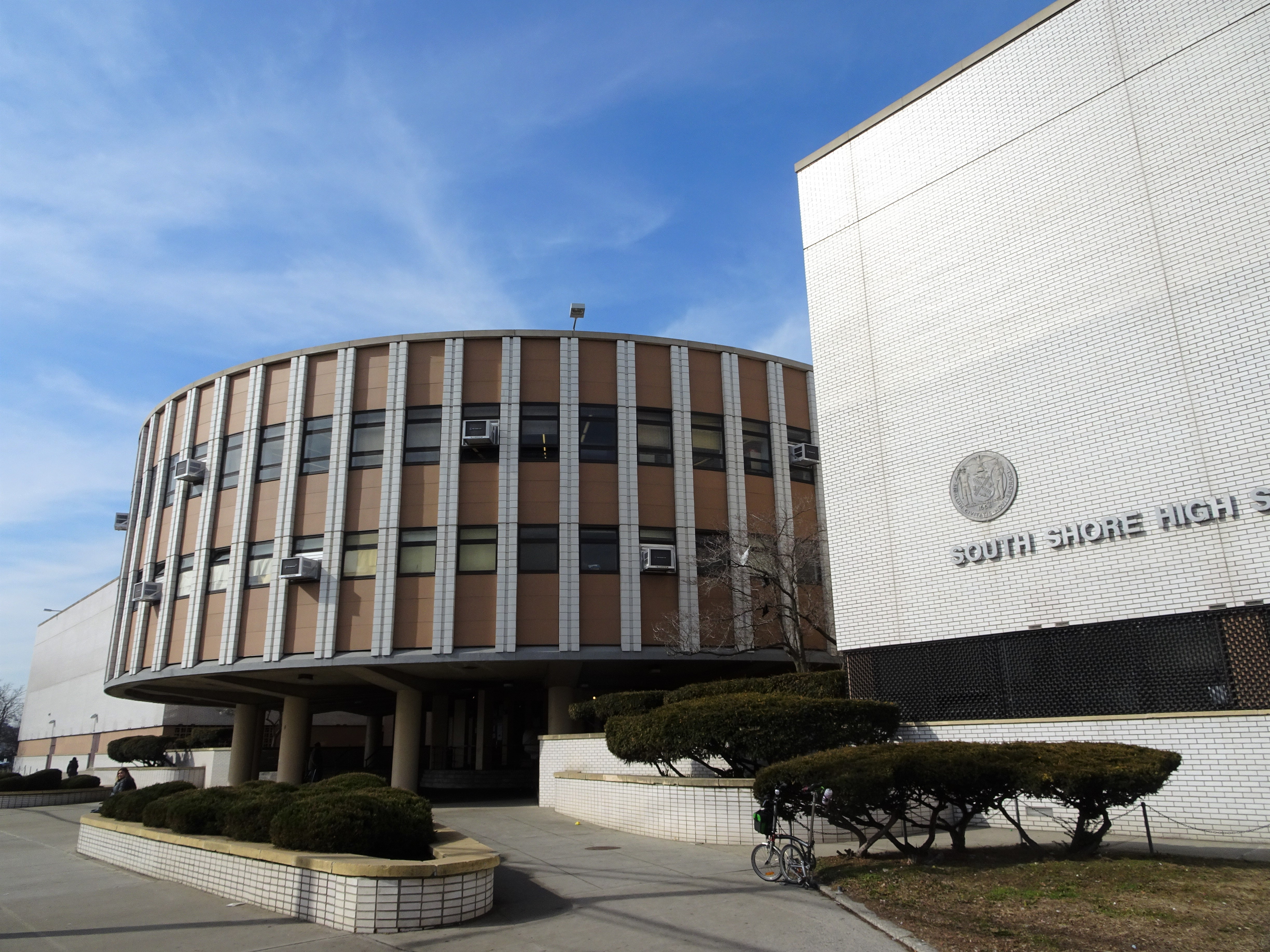

Location
- 6565 Flatlands Avenue; Brooklyn, NY; United States; 40°37′59″N 73°55′03″W

Information
- Type: Public
- Established: 1970
- Closed: 2014
- School district: Region 6
- Principal: Judy Henry
- Colors: Purple and Gold
- Mascot: Vikings
- Nickname: The Shore
- Information: Phone: 718-968-4100; Fax: 718-251-0248
- Website: South Shore High School

South Shore High School is one of the two defunct New York City public high schools in Canarsie, Brooklyn, the other being Canarsie High School. Opened in 1970, it had a capacity of 4000 students in grades nine through twelve. At the peak of enrollment, during the 1972–74 school years, the comprehensive high school had a student population of 6,800, making South Shore the second-largest high school in the United States at the time. To accommodate the large capacity of students 13 class periods were provided. The freshmen and sophomores were accommodated in the afternoon–early evening, while juniors and seniors were instructed in the early to late morning. An evening adult education center opened in 1973.

South Shore High School participated in City University of New York's College Now program, which provided senior-year students the opportunity to take courses for college credit on the high school campus. The program was run in cooperation with Kingsborough Community College.

While South Shore High was relatively problem-free through the 1970s and most of the 1980s, there were a few incidents, particularly during the 1970–71 school year, starting with interracial fighting in the opening month of school. Several student riots occurred during that opening year, forcing its first principal, Max Bromer, to resign. A riot occurred outside the school on the last day of classes in June 1987; one student was shot to death off campus in May 1990; in July 1990 a student was shot right outside the school in the rotunda and died in the hospital five days later. Another student was stabbed to death in a stairwell in September 1992.

Because of increasing security problems, South Shore High School is now closed and its final class graduated in June 2014. Five smaller schools are now operating on the campus: Brooklyn Theatre Arts High School, Brooklyn Bridge Academy, Brooklyn Community High School for Excellence and Equity (Brooklyn X), Victory Collegiate High School and, Academy for Conservation and the Environment, as well as the South Shore Young Adult Borough Center (YABC), an alternative high school evening program and a charter school, making a total of seven schools in the building.

The Brooklyn Comprehensive Night High School operated on the campus of South Shore High School beginning in 1970, but was closed in 2014.

== Notable alumni ==
- Alisha (born 1968), American freestyle and dance-pop singer.
- Katasha Artis (born 1973), professional basketball player and coach
- Troy Ave (born 1985), American rapper.
- Ill Bill (born 1972), American rapper and record producer.
- Frank Bisignano (born 1959), 18th Senate-confirmed Commissioner of the Social Security Administration and first Chief Executive Officer of the Internal Revenue Service.
- Michael De Luca (born 1965), Academy Awards nominated film studio executive, film producer and screenwriter.
- Suzanne Krull (1966–2013), actress
- Vic DiBitetto (born 1961), American stand-up comedian, Internet personality, and actor.
- Kadary Richmond (born 2001), basketball player
- Wayne Rosenthal (born 1965), former Major League Baseball pitcher and pitching coach.
- Annabella Sciorra (born 1960), actress and producer.
- Darren Phillip (born 1978), professional basketball player.
- SAINt JHN (born 1986), Guyanese-American rapper, singer and songwriter.
- Travis Tucker (born 1963), NFL tight end who played three seasons for the Cleveland Browns.
