= Lawrence Woodmere Academy =

Private school in Woodmere, New York, US

Location
- 336 Woodmere Boulevard; Woodmere, New York 11598; United States; 40.6352°N 73.7140°W

Information
- School type: Private, College-prep, Independent
- Motto: Veritas, Integritas, Servitium – "Truth, Integrity, Service"
- Established: 1912
- Dean: Fortune Gilbert
- Head of school: Hank Williams
- Faculty: 18
- Grades: Pre-K – 12
- Enrollment: 120
- Mascot: Tiger
- Nickname: LWA
- Team name: Tigers
- Website: www.lawrencewoodmere.org

Lawrence Woodmere Academy, also known as "LWA", and "Woodmere Academy", was an independent school located in Woodmere, New York, United States. It was accredited by the New York State Association of Independent Schools and the New York State Board of Regents.

== History ==
The history of the Academy began with the founding of Lawrence Country Day School in 1891 and Woodmere Academy in 1912. The institutions merged in 1990.

The motto of Woodmere Academy was Disce Servire, meaning "Learn to Serve". When Woodmere Academy and Lawrence Country Day School merged, the motto was updated to Veritas, Integritas, Servitium, "Truth, Integrity, Service".

Students came from all parts of Long Island, as well as countries abroad.

Officials with the Lawrence Woodmere Academy announced Friday July 18, 2025, that the school will not open for the 2025-2026 academic year this fall. The school's board of directors said in a statement that it, "made the difficult decision not to open the school for the 2025–26 academic year. This follows a period of extensive efforts to stabilize operations, including the pursuit of new partnerships and long-term strategic planning." The board added that pausing school operations "is the most responsible course to avoid disruption to students, families, and staff." The board said it will "focus on exploring sustainable paths" for the school during the pause, including a review on how the school can continue to serve the Five Towns community.

== Notable alumni ==
- Roger Berlind (1930–2020; class of 1948), theatrical producer who won 25 Tony Awards
- Stuart Beck (1946–2016, Class of 1964), Lawyer and diplomat for Palau who helped negotiate the Compact of Free Association, which established Palau as an independent nation in free association with the United States in 1994.
- Matthew Blank, (Class of 1968), CEO of Showtime Networks
- Karen Burstein (Class of 1960), politician and former judge who was the unsuccessful Democratic nominee for New York State Attorney General in 1994.
- Michael Cohen (Class of 1984), Executive Vice-President, Trump Organization; Special Counsel to Donald Trump.
- Jordan Dingle (born 2000), college basketball player for the Penn Quakers of the Ivy League.
- Andrew Barth Feldman (born 2002), winner of best actor at the 2018 Jimmy Awards and star of Dear Evan Hansen on Broadway
- Barbara Heldt (born 1940; class of 1958), emerita professor of Russian and Slavic studies.
- David A. Kessler (born 1951; class of 1969), former Food and Drug Administration Commissioner and best-selling author
- Victor LaValle (born 1972; class of 1991), author
- Richard LeFrak (born 1945; class of 1963), real-estate developer
- Neil David Levin (1954–2001, class of 1972), Executive Director of the Port Authority of New York and New Jersey, killed during the September 11 terrorist attacks on the World Trade Center.
- Tyrone Nash (born 1988, class of 2006), professional basketball player
- Michael Pertschuk (1933–2022; class of 1950), chairman of the Federal Trade Commission from 1977 to 1981
- Tony Petitti (Class of 1979), Chief Operating Officer of Major League Baseball
- Robin Wagner (born 1957, class of 1975), Olympic figure-skating coach
- Bob Wolff (1920–2017, class of 1938), sports radio broadcaster
- Matt Irizarry (Born 1996, class of 2014), electrical engineer integral to the JFK Terminal 6 electrical design
