= Watervliet Junior-Senior High School =

Location
- 1245 Hillside Dr; Watervliet, (Albany County), New York 12189; United States
- Coordinates: 42.732027°N 73.716101°W

Information
- School type: Public school (government funded), high school
- School district: Watervliet City School District
- NCES District ID: 3630210
- Superintendent: Donald Stevens, phd
- CEEB code: 335830
- NCES School ID: 363021004061
- Principal: Jessie Richards
- Faculty: 54.80 (on an FTE basis)
- Grades: 6–12
- Enrollment: 804 (2022-23)
- Student to teacher ratio: 10.36
- Campus: City:small
- Colors: Garnet and Gray
- Mascot: Cannoneers

Watervliet Junior-Senior High School is a public high school located in Watervliet, Albany County, New York, U.S.A., and is the only high school operated by the Watervliet City School District.
