= St. Mary's High School (Lancaster, New York) =

Location
- 142 Laverack Avenue, Lancaster, NY 14086; Lancaster, New York 14086; United States; 42°54′24″N 78°40′44″W

Information
- Type: Private, Coeducational
- Motto: Bonitatem et disciplinam et scientiam doce me. (Teach me goodness kindness and discipline.)
- Religious affiliation: Catholic
- Patron saint: The Blessed Mother under the title of Immaculate Heart of Mary
- Established: 1904
- Head of school: Kevin Kelleher
- Chaplain: Robb Ciezki (Deacon)
- Teaching staff: 28
- Grades: 9-12
- Enrollment: 411 (2020-21)
- Student to teacher ratio: 11:1
- Colors: Navy blue, Carolina Blue and White
- Athletics conference: Monsignor Martin Athletic Association
- Nickname: Lancers
- Rival: Lancaster High School (New York), Depew High School, Cardinal O'Hara High School (Tonawanda, New York)
- Publication: Latest on Laverack (Monthly Newsletter), The Lance (alumni paper)
- Yearbook: The Lance
- Website: www.smhlancers.org

St. Mary's High School (SMHS) is a co-educational, college-preparatory, Catholic high school located in Lancaster, New York, 4.5 miles South East of the Buffalo Niagara International Airport and 14.5 East of downtown Buffalo. St. Mary's has a curriculum based on college readiness, with different majors offered and dual-enrollment with St. Bonaventure University. St. Mary's enrollment includes students in grades 9-12 from four counties and approximately 30 school districts. The current "Head of School" is Kevin Kelleher.

== History ==
St. Mary's High School was founded in 1904 as a co-ed catholic high school serving the Western New York area.

== Academics ==
St. Mary's High School is a college-preparatory school that utelizes a semester-based calendar to better align the teaching style with upper-level education. SMHS has an "academy" system which allows students to expirience six different college majors over their four years in the school, helping them pick the right major when they go to college.

In addition to the academy program, SMHS also has dual-enrollment with St. Bonaventure University. Students take certified college courses at St. Mary's and receive college level credit through St. Bonaventure. The students can use this credit when they then graduate high school and go to college. This is in addition to the AP courses SMHS offers.

== Athletics ==
St. Mary's offers 27 sports with 34 different teams. 85% of the student body participates in sports, with teams winning championships on a consistent level.

== Notable alumni ==
- Dale Volker- Retired New York State Senator, 59th Senate District
- Frank Lazarus-Provost and Vice President for Academic Affairs at Assumption College in Worcester, Massachusetts
- Adam Page- USA Sledge Hockey Player and 3-time Paralympic Gold Medalist
- Shay Ciezki, basketball player
- David Szymanski, Dean of Baylor's Hankmaker School of Business
