= Westhill Senior High School =

Location
- 4501 Onondaga Blvd; Geddes, New York 13219; United States; 43°1′48″N 76°12′8″W

Information
- Type: Public
- Established: 1963
- School district: Westhill Central Schools
- NCES School ID: 360732000524
- Principal: Daniel Dolan
- Teaching staff: 52.00 (on an FTE basis)
- Grades: 9-12
- Enrollment: 552 (2023-2024)
- Student to teacher ratio: 10.62
- Campus: Suburban: Large
- Colors: Blue and White
- Mascot: Wolf
- Team name: Wolf Pack
- Website: www.westhillschools.org/highschool

Westhill Senior High School is a public high school located in the western suburbs of, and immediately adjacent to, the City of Syracuse, New York. It serves grades 9 through 12, primarily from the neighborhood of Westvale (located in the Town of Geddes), as well as portions of the Onondaga Hill area (located in the Town of Onondaga). Westhill Senior High School is part of the Westhill Central School District.

== Overview ==
Established in 1963 as Westhill Junior-Senior High School serving grades 7-12 at the time, Westhill High School maintains a local reputation in the Syracuse area for having a high graduation rate, a large percentage of graduates attending college, and a successful athletic program. Beginning with the 2025–26 school year, the school's athletic teams compete as the Westhill Wolf Pack.

Westhill's athletic teams were known as the Warriors for many years. Following a mandate by the New York State Education Department requiring schools to discontinue Native American–associated team names and imagery, the Westhill Central School District adopted the nickname "Wolf Pack", effective July 1, 2025.

== Educational achievement ==
More than 95% of Westhill graduates go on to college. According to the school's website, 98% of June 2006 Westhill graduates earned a Regents Diploma. In June 2006 Regents Examinations, with approximately 1450 exams administered, Westhill students had an overall pass rate of 99%.

In the second year of the higher standards culminating in the Regents Diploma with Advanced Designation, 93% of Westhill's graduates in June 2006 reached such a level of achievement, and an additional 98% were awarded a Regents Diploma.

== Athletic programs ==
Westhill's interscholastic sports program offers 35 teams at various levels serving 24 varsity sports. With nearly 56% of Westhill high school students participating in interscholastic athletics, and with an overall varsity winning percentage of nearly 80%, Westhill teams won 2005-06 league championships in Boys' Cross Country, Girls' Tennis, Girls' Indoor Track, Boys' Basketball, Girls' Basketball, Girls' Outdoor Track, and Baseball. Section III Class B Championships were won by Football (2003 & 2004), the Girls' Tennis, Boys' Cross Country (under the coaching of Jerry Smith), Boys' Basketball, and Girls' Indoor Track teams.

Fifteen out of twenty varsity teams won New York State Public High School Athletic Association Academic Awards for maintaining the required number of students on the roster and having composite GPAs of 90% or higher. Fifteen Westhill seniors participated in all three varsity sport seasons, while collectively maintaining an overall GPA of more than 90%.

The Westhill Athletic Department has also laid claim to several State Championships, including:

- Girls' Soccer 1993, 1995, 1996, 1999, 2017
- Boys' Soccer 1992, 2018, 2025
- Girls' Basketball 1989, 1996
- Boys' Basketball 1997, 2010, 2014, 2015, 2017, 2023, 2026
- Baseball 2009, 2010
- Girls Volleyball 2018, 2019, 2025

Note: Westhill competed in Class C until 1995, and has been Class B since then. The Cross Country and Track teams, upon merging with Bishop Ludden High School, were in Class A for the 2010-2011 school year. They returned to Class B before the 2011 Cross Country season.

== Clubs and activities ==
Westhill has a multitude of clubs and activities offered to students during and outside of school hours. These include FBLA, Academic Decathlon, Character Education, French and Spanish Club, Tri-M, Literary Magazine, Book Club, Math Team, Mock Trial, * Chem Club, select choirs, Positivity Project, and more.

== Notable alumni ==
- Keith B. Alexander, former head of the National Security Agency (NSA)
- Dave Lemanczyk, Major League Baseball pitcher (1973-1980)
- Casey Rogers, American football player
- Ben Walsh, mayor of Syracuse
