= Nazareth Regional High School (Brooklyn) =

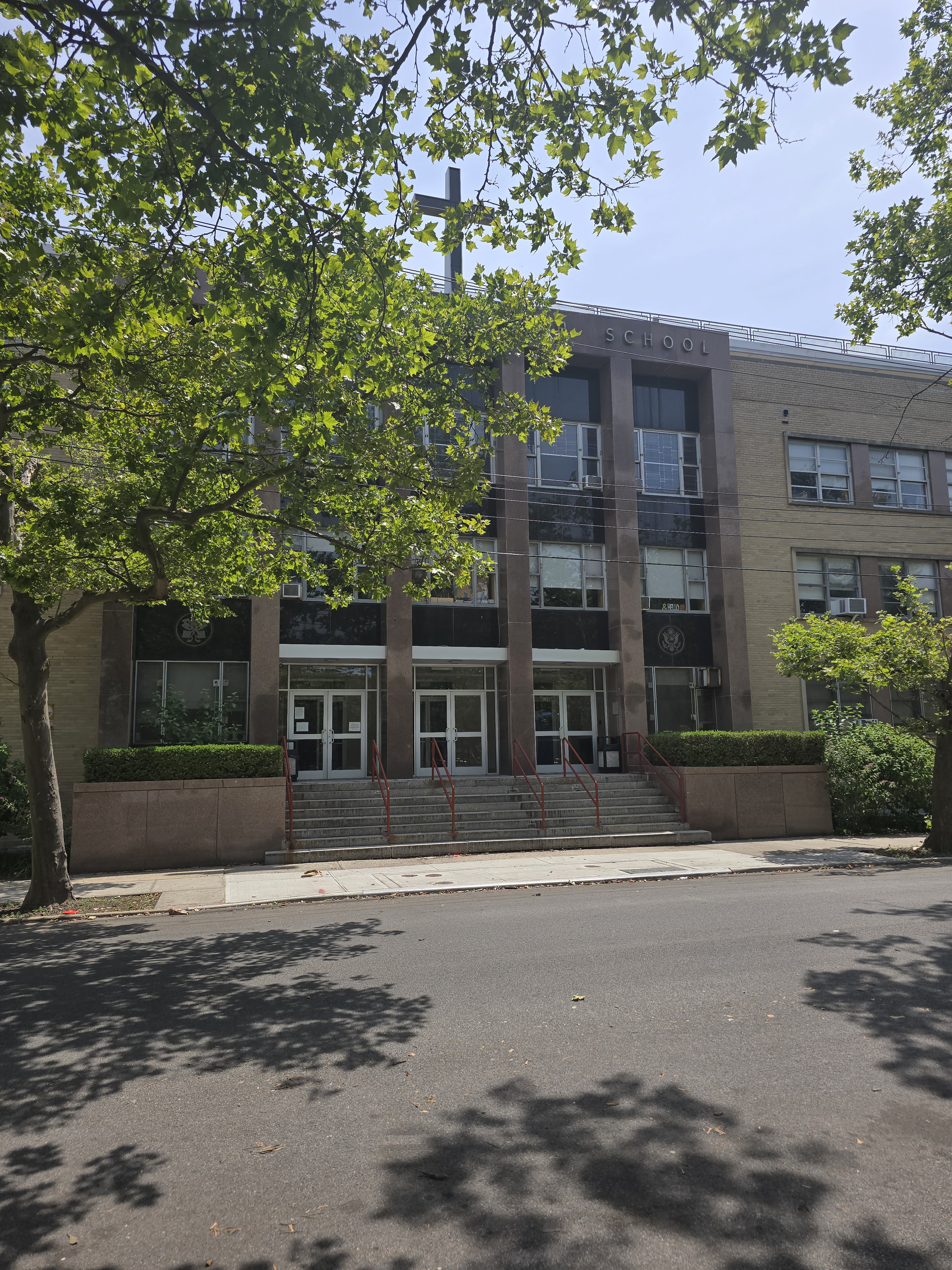
- Nazareth Regional High School

Location
- 475 East 57th Street; East Flatbush, Brooklyn, New York 11203; United States; 40°38′38″N 73°55′21″W

Information
- Type: Private; college preparatory; day; Catholic school
- Religious affiliation: Roman Catholic
- Established: 1962
- Oversight: Roman Catholic Diocese of Brooklyn
- Dean: Monique Fisher
- Principal: Robert DiRe
- Grades: 9–12
- Gender: Co-Educational
- Enrollment: 400 (2016)
- Average class size: 25
- Campus type: Urban
- Colors: Maroon and Gold
- Slogan: Where bright futures begin!
- Mascot: Knight
- Nickname: Naz
- Team name: Kingsmen
- Accreditation: Middle States Association of Colleges and Schools
- Newspaper: Excalibur
- School fees: Books, Gym uniform, etc: $750; Senior fee: $400
- Tuition: $10,150–$10,550 (2024-25)
- Affiliation: Xaverian Brothers
- Graduation Rate: 99%
- Online Organization Service: PlusPortals
- Website: www.nazarethrhs.org

Nazareth Regional High School is a four-year private, Roman Catholic, college preparatory high school in Brooklyn, New York. It is located within the Roman Catholic Diocese of Brooklyn.

It is a multiethnic, multi-religious, coeducational school that offers a four-year academic, college preparatory and religious education curriculum. It is governed by a policy-making lay board of trustees and affiliated with the American Central Province of the Xaverian Brothers. It is chartered by the Board of Regents of the University of the State of New York, and accredited by the Middle States Association of Colleges and SchoolIt serves approximately 400 students from the New York metropolitan area.

== Background ==
Nazareth Regional High School was established in 1962 by the Xaverian Brothers. The architect was Anthony J. DePace.

The first semester of its initial year was conducted at the newly completed Bishop Kearney High School, as Nazareth’s building was unfinished. In the spring of 1963, Bishop Bryan Joseph McEntegart dedicated the new building, and the first class of freshmen and small faculty moved into their own school. Brother Thaddeus, C.F.X., served as first principal until 1966. He and the other Xaverian Brothers and Catholic laymen who administered and staffed the school centered its goals around the theme “wisdom, age, and favor with God” because these were the qualities of Jesus as described in Scripture as he grew up in the town of Nazareth.

The first class of Nazareth Kingsmen graduated in June 1966. In 1974, the Principal, Brother Mathew Burke, with the encouragement of Bishop Francis Mugavero, formed a new Catholic school governed by a Board of Trustees because the diocese could no longer continue to subsidize the school. The new school was called Nazareth Regional High School and was staffed mostly by Catholic laypersons along with some religious men and women. In 1976, the school admitted women for the first time, and in June 1980, Mary Anne Tang, the first female valedictorian was selected.

In 1994, the school was formally affiliated with the network of schools sponsored by the Xaverian Brothers’ American Province. Today, it is a fully developed Catholic, co-educational, secondary school serving students from parochial, private and public schools throughout Brooklyn and parts of Queens. The school faced financial difficulties in 2012; it was feared it would close at the end of the academic year due to a decline in enrollment and overwhelming debt. However, alumni and others] raised $700,000 in six weeks, allowing it to remain open.

== Notable alumni ==
- Richard Crudo, cinematographer\director
- Byron Donalds, Representative for Florida's 19th congressional district
- Mike Dunleavy Sr., former NBA player and head coach
- William Forsythe, actor
- Stewart Granger, former NBA basketball player
- Kenny Kirkland, musician
- Sofía Roma, basketball player
- Jim Sclavunos, musician and composer
- Romeo Tirone, cinematographer and television director
