= Regis High School (New York City) =

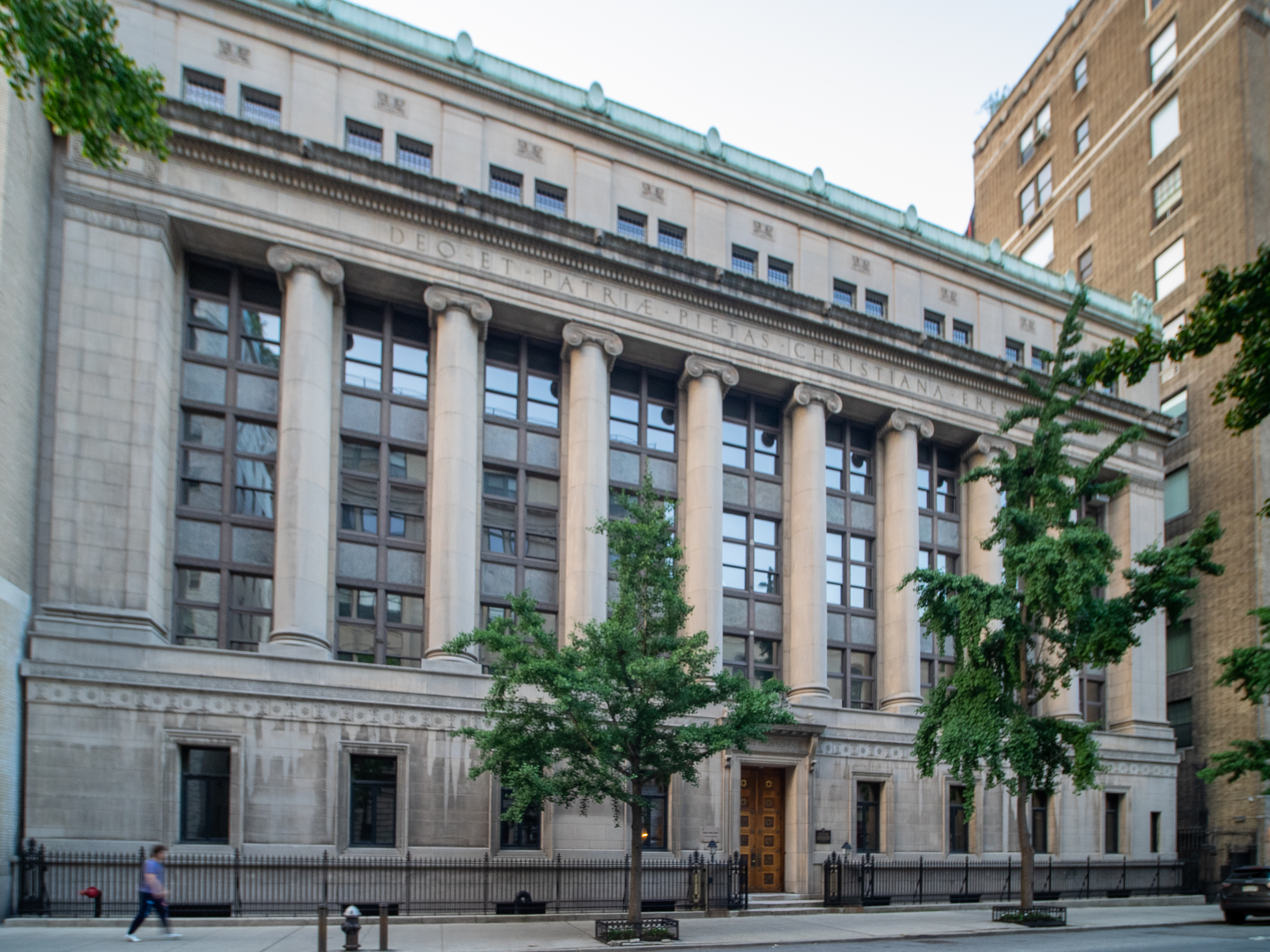
- As seen from East 84th Street (2019)

Location
- 55 East 84th Street (Upper East Side, Manhattan); New York City, New York 10028; United States; 40°46′47″N 73°57′32″W

Information
- School type: Private Day
- Motto: Latin: Deo et Patriae Pietas Christiana Erexit ("Built by Christian Piety for God and Country")
- Religious affiliations: Roman Catholic (Jesuit)
- Patron saint: St. John Francis Regis
- Established: 1914; 112 years ago
- Founder: Julia M. Grant
- President: Rev. Christopher Devron, S.J.
- Faculty: 109
- Grades: 9–12
- Gender: Boys
- Enrollment: 540 (2025-2026)
- Student to teacher ratio: 1:12
- Campus type: Urban
- Colors: Scarlet; Silver; White
- Athletics conference: Catholic High School Athletic Association
- Mascot: Owl
- Nickname: Raiders
- Accreditation: Middle States Association of Colleges and Schools
- Tuition: Free
- Website: regis.org

Regis High School is an all-male, Jesuit high school located on the Upper East Side of Manhattan in New York City.

== History ==
=== Founding ===
Regis High School was founded in 1914, through the financial bequest of a single (originally anonymous) benefactress, Julia M. Grant, (Note: The identity of the school's founding benefactor was officially kept secret for decades, though the large portrait in the school's first floor conference room titled "Julia Grant" contradicted the official policy. The online announcement, of an auction that included items related to the school's founding, did so as well. Finally, on October 26, 2009, a documentary film revealed her identity and detailed the circumstances of her gift.) the widow of New York City mayor Hugh J. Grant. She stipulated that her gift be used to build a Jesuit high school providing a free education for Catholic boys with special consideration given to those who could not otherwise afford a Catholic education. The school continues that policy and does not charge tuition.

Following the death of her husband in 1910, Julia Grant met with David W. Hearn, S.J. and, with a stipulation of strict anonymity, gave him an envelope with the money needed to start a school to educate Catholic boys. From its opening in 1914 until the late 1960s, Regis was regarded by Julia Grant and her children as their private charity. Only in the late 1960s did they reluctantly agree to allow the alumni of Regis to contribute to the school's financial support. The last surviving member of the family, Lucie Mackey Grant, a daughter-in-law of Julia Grant, died in 2007.

=== Sexual misconduct cases (2021, 2023) ===
In April 2021, the school announced that it was firing its president, Daniel Lahart, S.J. after an investigation confirmed that he had engaged in sexual misconduct which included "inappropriate and unwelcome verbal communications and physical conduct, all of a sexual nature, with adult members of the Regis community, including subordinates". Regis' board of trustees voted to fire Lahart, and he was terminated on April 21, 2021.

In April 2023, Xavier High School teacher Matthew Chicas, who was working at the Regis REACH program, was arrested by police and subsequently placed on suspension by the school. He was found attempting to film with his cell phone an 11-year-old pupil using a toilet.

== Extracurricular activities ==
The Owl, the school's newspaper, interviewed Central Intelligence Agency leak case prosecutor and alumnus Patrick J. Fitzgerald in 2006. Its article was linked on the Drudge Report and quoted by the Associated Press.

The school also has other publications such as

- The Cardinal (Music Magazine)
- The Crow (Journal of Opinion)
- The Falcon (Sports Magazine)
- The Flamingo (Comedy Publication)
- The Pigeon (Social Justice Newsletter)
- The Raven (Literary and Visual Arts Magazine)

The Regis Speech and Debate Society, also known as the Hearn Society, is ranked second nationally by the National Speech and Debate Association as of June 2025. In April 2025, the Hearn Society won the State Speech and Debate Championship for the 34th time in 40 years under the leadership of Eric DiMichele.

The Regis Repertory has performed plays and musicals since 1918. They collaborate with female students attending neighboring schools such as Marymount School and Dominican Academy.

== Athletics ==
Regis is home to teams in basketball, baseball, soccer, volleyball, golf, ultimate frisbee, and track and field. Given the location of the school, many of their events take place on Randall's Island. The biggest event every year is a triple-header set of basketball games against their rival, Xavier High School, in which the freshman, JV, and Varsity teams play back to back. Regis won the CHSAA Class B state basketball championship in March 2024, its seventh title overall.

== Building ==
The school building is part of the historic Saint Ignatius Loyola Jesuit complex and was designed by Maginnis & Walsh to harmonize in scale with the Church of St. Ignatius Loyola located across the street. Located between Park Avenue and Madison Avenue, with entrances on both 85th and 84th street, the building was partially completed in 1914. Construction on the three-story-high, 1700-seat auditorium was delayed due to World War I preventing the import of the desired Italian marble to be used. It was eventually completed the next year.

In the late 1970s, the stone owl over the south door, popular with students and alumni at the time, disappeared. In 1980, the assistant headmaster found the culprit who stole the owl and privately met up with them to have it returned. It now resides in the Regis Archive, and four owls were placed in the quadrangle to commemorate its return. The owl was later made the official mascot of Regis, with his younger brother Walter being introduced a number of years later.

In 2024, Regis High School announced their plans to renovate their lower gym and to create a fitness center as a part of their 2024 Auction Challenge. The renovated gym and new fitness center was dedicated on October 9, 2024.

== Notable alumni ==
Among the most notable Regis alumni are:

- Bill Condon, Academy Award-winning screenwriter and director
- Anthony Fauci, infectious disease physician, former head of NIAID, major public figure during COVID-19
- Chuck Feeney, billionaire philanthropist, founder of Duty Free Shoppers, gave away almost all his fortune
- Greg Giraldo, well-known comedian and TV personality
- Pete Hamill, celebrated journalist and author
- Mark Mazzetti, Pulitzer Prize–winning New York Times reporter
- Dan McGrath, former writer and producer for shows such as The Simpsons, King of the Hill, and Gravity Falls
- Colin Jost, comedian, former Saturday Night Live head writer and Weekend Update co-anchor
- Phil Klay, National Book Award–winning author
- John O’Keefe, Nobel Prize winner in Physiology or Medicine (2014)
- Jim Sciutto, chief national security correspondent for CNN

== In popular culture ==
- Television shows and film have used Regis High School as a setting. Shows include: Law & Order: Criminal Intent, The Ordained, and The Good Wife.
- Rock band O.A.R. filmed portions of the music video for their song "Lay Down," with scenes filmed in the Regis Quad, Auditorium, 4th Floor hallway, a classroom, and various stairwells.
- In 2013, two Capital One commercials starring Alec Baldwin were filmed in a Regis classroom and outside Regis High School.
- Lady Gaga was a member of the Regis Repertory during her high school years at the Convent of the Sacred Heart. Gaga played the lead roles of Adelaide in the musical Guys and Dolls and Philia in the musical A Funny Thing Happened on the Way to the Forum
- SNL's Colin Jost attended Regis and graduated in 2000. He participated in the Hearn Speech and Debate Team and was the editor for the school newspaper, The Owl.

== See also ==
- List of Jesuit sites
- List of New York City Designated Landmarks in Manhattan from 59th to 110th Streets

== Sources ==
- Andreassi, Anthony (2014). Teach Me to Be Generous: The First Century of Regis High School in New York City. "Excerpt".
- Peterson's Private Secondary Schools 2008. (Peterson's: Lawrenceville, New Jersey, 2007), p. 485. Retrieved September 7, 2010.
