= The Park School of Buffalo =

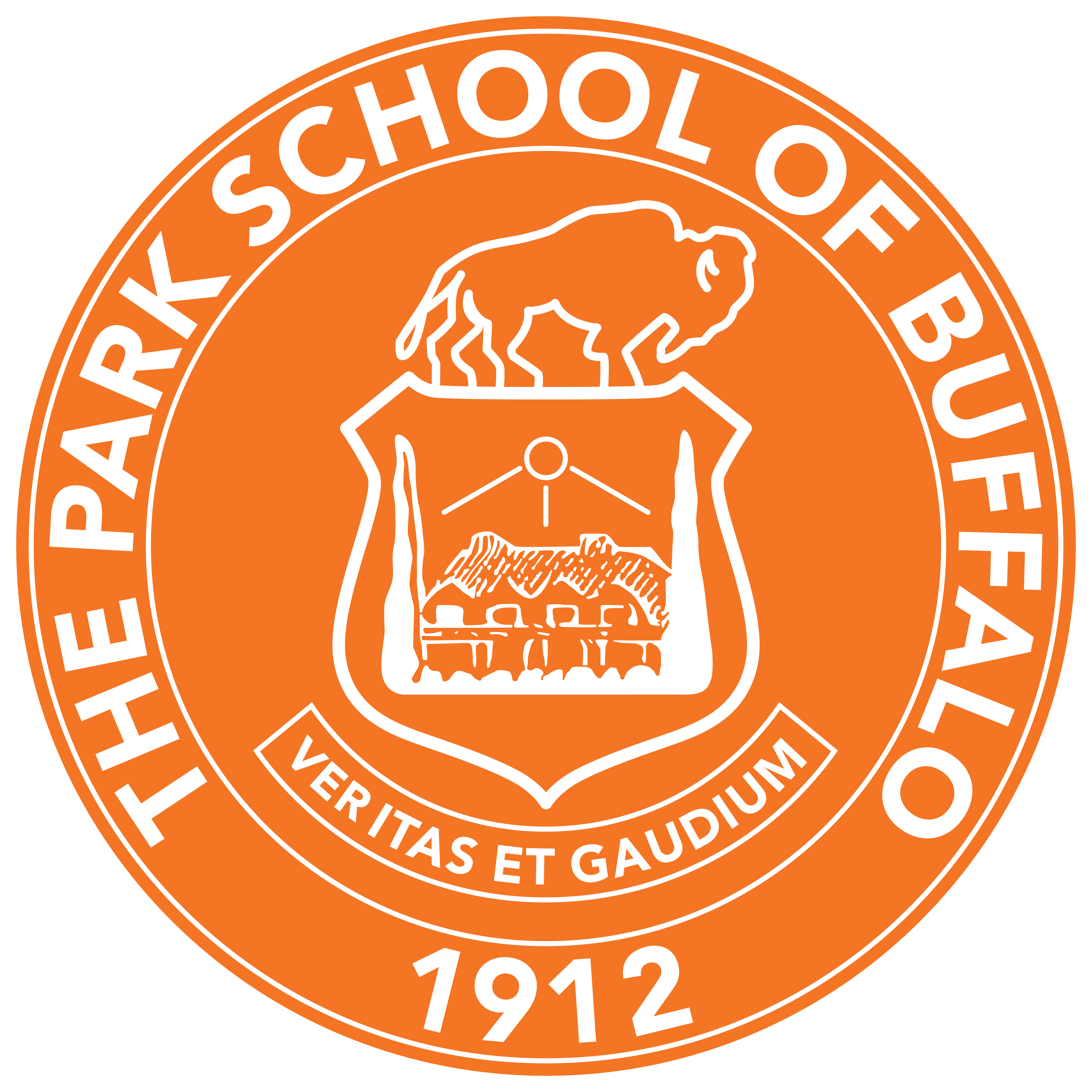

Location
- 4625 Harlem Road; Town of Amherst; Amherst, Erie, New York 14226-3846; United States; 42°58′2.23″N 78°46′52.57″W

Information
- School type: Private, Day
- Motto: Veritas et Gaudium (Truth and Joy)
- Founded: 1912
- Founder: Mary Hammett Lewis
- Headmaster: Lisa Conrad
- Grades: Pre-K - 12 and Montessori
- Student to teacher ratio: 8:1
- Campus size: 34 acres (140,000 m^{2})
- Campus type: Suburban
- Colors: Orange and brown
- Song: The Park School Hymn, There is a School
- Athletics: Yes
- Sports: Yes
- Mascot: Pioneers
- Accreditation: NAIS
- Yearbook: Spark
- Endowment: $1.6 million
- Alumni: Sam Hoyt; Jordan Nwora
- Website: http://www.theparkschool.org/

The Park School of Buffalo is a private, co-educational, college preparatory school located in Amherst, New York (north of Buffalo). Founded in 1912 during the American country day school movement, the institution features lower, middle, and upper schools, serving roughly 290 students from Pre-Kindergarten and Montessori through grade 12.

== About Park ==
=== History ===
Originally located in downtown Buffalo, The Park School was founded in 1912 by a group of Buffalo parents seeking an alternative to the existing pre-preparatory institutions in the area. The group consulted with John Dewey and observed one of his students, Mary Hammett Lewis of Columbia University, then an instructor at the prestigious Horace Mann School in New York City.

Lewis was invited to Buffalo to become the founding headmistress. She later wrote a book, An Adventure with Children, describing her experiences at the school. As the student body grew, it was decided that an upper preparatory school should be added. Originally for girls, the upper school began accepting boys in the early 1930s, then offering the only private, co-educational experience in the Buffalo area.

=== Campus ===
In 1920, Chauncey Hamlin, a prominent Buffalonian, President of the American Association of Museums and founder of the Buffalo Museum of Science, offered his estate to the Park School Board, which arranged for its purchase. The estate, in Snyder, had a large mansion, farmhouse, barn, small forest, orchard and pond, and a stone house at the entrance. Two of the original buildings constructed in the late 19th century, and one historic building that was a part of the Underground Railroad in the early 19th century, are still used by the school.

Hamlin Hall, the school's oldest building, in snow

The most notable of these buildings remains Hamlin Hall, where most of the Upper School classes are held. Additional buildings include Chapin Hall, Kimball Hall, Stone Hall, The Rich Family Activity Center, Helen Long Building, the Clement Gymnasium, Preston L. Wright Greenhouse and a newly constructed (2009) dining hall, as well as a pool and tennis courts.

In January 2016, it was announced that the school had retained CannonDesign as architect for the Knopp-Hailpern Science Center, the first new building constructed on campus in 11 years. The building, which may be between 8,500 square feet and 10,000 square feet, is named after the late Dr. Jacky Knopp and Dr. Raoul Hailpern, two mathematics teachers and educators who worked not only at Park, but also at the University at Buffalo and Canisius College. The building is proposed to be nestled between Stone and Hamlin Halls just off the "circle" in the middle of the 34-acre campus. Park indicated that it is within $416,000 of the $4 million goal to cover the center's development and construction costs. Groundbreaking began in 2017.

== Academics and programs ==
=== Faculty ===
The current interim head of school and principal is Lisa Conrad, the first woman appointed to lead the Park School of Buffalo since Leslie Leland was appointed headmistress in 1925. Conrad, a New York State Certified teacher, holds a master's degree in adolescent education (7-12) and a bachelor's degree in Spanish education, both from SUNY University at Buffalo. She was the dean of the Middle School and has also held positions in the admissions and enrollment department.

=== Traditions ===
Students at the school continue to engage in a variety of school traditions, many of them as old as the school itself. A Thanksgiving Feast is held annually, during which students and faculty from all three schools (Lower, Middle and Upper) assemble in the refectory for a traditional dinner and accompanying festivities. The feast is traditionally prepared by the Upper School graduating class, and is often attended by parents, grandparents and alumni. Country Fair, held each fall since the 1930s, is an old-fashioned fair with games and food for families, including the favorite "lemons with peppermint sticks" sold by the senior class. Another notable, though somewhat younger tradition, is the Orange and Brown competition. Each newly admitted student is randomly assigned to a team representing one of the school's colors. The teams compete throughout the year, accruing points through a variety of athletic and academic events, with the annual winning color inscribed on a trophy. One of the competitions between the Orange and Brown teams is Winter Carnival. For half a day the high school goes outside and they compete in different activities. The last activity is always a relay race, then there is a group hug between the whole high school.

=== School hymn ===
The Park School Hymn, written in 1930, is traditionally sung at school gatherings and events. The lyrics are as follows:

"Park School, we sing to thee, songs thou hast taught our eager youth.
Hearts filled with love and loyalty, we give to follow in thy truth.
We have striven at thy side, searched for heights at thy behest;
there were no winds we did not ride, in seeking life in gallant quest.
Park School, oh hear our song, born of joy and knowledge free.
Fulfillment that we sought for so long, we ever attain-ed here in thee."

=== Clubs and student organizations ===
The Upper School is notable for the degree to which the student body is involved in administrative and decision-making processes. There is an active Student Government organization, which annually elects a voting representative to the school's Board of Trustees. The Ecology Club, Mock Trial organization and Model UN Club are all popular among students. The Buffalo Rapids of the American Basketball Association played home games at the school from November 2005 to February 2006.

=== Park School summer camp ===
Each summer the school runs a summer day camp that is open to Park students and non-Park students from throughout the Greater Buffalo region. The school also offers annual soccer and basketball camps for boys and girls ages 8–14.
