= Cardinal O'Hara High School (Tonawanda, New York) =

Private school in Tonawanda, New York, United States

Location
- 39 O'Hara Road; Town of Tonawanda, (Erie County), New York 14150; United States; 43°0′0″N 78°51′45″W

Information
- Type: Private, Coeducational
- Motto: Envision ∙ Explore ∙ Experience
- Religious affiliations: Catholic; Franciscan
- Established: 1961
- Principal: Laura Osinski
- Faculty: 28
- Grades: 9-12
- Colors: Black and Gold
- Athletics: Basketball, Football, Baseball, Hockey, Softball, Soccer
- Athletics conference: Monsignor Martin Athletic Association
- Team name: Hawks
- Tuition: $9,975
- Website: www.cardinalohara.com

Cardinal O'Hara High School is a private, Catholic high school in Tonawanda Town, New York, within the Diocese of Buffalo.

== Notable alumni ==
- Donel Cathcart - Professional basketball player, played college basketball at Youngstown State University
- Gregory John Hartmayer, O.F.M. Conv., Archbishop of Atlanta
- Bill Scherrer - Former professional baseball relief pitcher from 1982-1988
- Robin Schimminger - Politician from the state of New York
