= Todhunter =

Todhunter is a surname of English origin. At the time of the British Census of 1881 Todhunter Surname at Forebears, its relative frequency was highest in Cumberland (59.9 times the British average), followed by the Isle of Man, Huntingdonshire, Cambridgeshire, Cheshire, Northumberland, Lancashire, Surrey, Essex, and County Durham.

Todhunter may also refer to:

- Charles Todhunter (1869–1949), civil servant
- Isaac Todhunter (1820–1884), English mathematician and author
- John Todhunter (1839–1916), Irish poet and playwright
- John A. Todhunter (born 1949), American government official in the EPA 1981–83
- Francis A. Todhunter (1884-1963), American commercial artist and landscape painter
- Winifred Todhunter (1877–1961), British educator; founder of the Todhunter School for Girls in New York City

== See also ==
- Todhunter Ballard (1903–1980), author
- Mary Todhunter Rockefeller (1907-1999), First Lady of New York
- Thomas Todhunter Shields (1873–1955), pastor
- Rex Todhunter Stout (1886-1975), novelist
- Todd Hunter (disambiguation)
