= New York Interschool =

Consortium of independent schools in Manhattan

New York Interschool Association
- Founded: 1971
- Tax ID no.: 13-3218842
- Legal status: 501(c)(3) nonprofit organization
- Location(s): 378 West End Avenue, Room 706 New York, NY United States
- Region served: New York City
- Executive Director: Adrienne Barr
- Associate Director: Brandie Clarke
- Revenue: $645,241 (2017)
- Expenses: $639,173 (2017)
- Website: www.interschool.org

The New York Interschool Association Inc., is a consortium of eight independent schools in Manhattan that serves students, teachers, and administration.

== Overview ==
The Interschool is designed primarily for the coming together of the eight Manhattan private schools to do interschool activities, and also to the widely known Faculty Diverse Search and the Teachers Fellows and posting resumes for one of the member and associated schools.

Teachers and professors may apply to any of the member or associated schools through Interschool.

== History ==
Interschool's mission, in 1971, was to provide "school programming" to the single-sex independent schools in Manhattan.

== Member school activities ==
From the Interschool's homepage:

Joint activities include faculty gatherings to support curriculum development and professional growth, and activities such as the annual choral festival and the winter peer leadership retreat that allow students to come together with a common purpose. Interschool also facilitates joint courses and academic sharing across its member schools. In addition to programs serving the eight member schools only, there are two major Interschool programs that are open to other interested independent schools in New York City.

== Faculty Diverse Search ==
FDS seeks to recruit and select an outstanding pool of candidates of color for 25 New York City independent schools to consider for their faculty and administrative openings. Openings are for teachers of all grades, both entry-level and experienced. Openings for academic deans and division heads, technologists, librarians, learning specialists, counselors, admissions, and development officers require an advanced degree and two or more years of experience.

== Fellows Program ==
Established in 1984, the Fellows Program is sponsored by the eight New York independent schools which comprise the Interschool consortium: Brearley, Browning, Chapin, Collegiate, Dalton, Nightingale-Bamford, Spence and Trinity. Any first or second year New York City independent school teacher is eligible to participate in the Fellows Program with his or her schools' approval.

The Interschool Fellows Program offers teachers in their first or second year of independent school teaching a program of support and guidance led by experienced teachers and administrators. The core of the program is a two-hour evening seminar on Tuesday evenings from late September to mid-March. The purpose of these seminars is to introduce teachers to the independent school community and to the challenges and rewards of the teaching profession.

Sessions are held in different schools and presenters are drawn from a wide pool of veteran teachers who address topics of interest to beginning teachers. In addition, each year the Fellows' group provides a supportive environment for individual members to share and exchange ideas and information. Topics addressed in the Fellows' sessions include: lesson planning, developing curriculum, teaching to different learning styles, partnering with parents, classroom use of technology, meeting the needs of a diverse student body, where to seek professional development. One of the highlights of the program is the chance to receive feedback from the program coordinators who observe each Fellow's class at least once a year.

== Schools ==
=== Member schools ===
The eight member schools. All are located within Manhattan.

- Brearley School
- Browning School
- Chapin School
- Collegiate School
- Dalton School
- The Nightingale-Bamford School
- Spence School
- Trinity School

=== Associated schools ===
There are also a number associated schools. All are located within Manhattan unless otherwise noted.

- Allen-Stevenson School
- Berkeley Carroll School in Brooklyn
- Birch Wathen Lenox School
- Buckley School
- Convent of the Sacred Heart
- Calhoun School
- Columbia Grammar and Preparatory School
- Ethical Culture Fieldston School (partially in Riverdale, Bronx)
- Friends Seminary
- Grace Church School
- Hewitt School
- Horace Mann School in Riverdale, Bronx
- Little Red School House and Elisabeth Irwin High School
- Marymount School of New York
- Packer Collegiate Institute in Brooklyn Heights, Brooklyn
- Poly Prep Country Day School in Dyker Heights and Park Slope, Brooklyn
- Riverdale Country School in Riverdale, Bronx
- St. Bernard's School
- St. David's School
- St. Luke's School
- Staten Island Academy Prep School in Todt Hill, Staten Island
- Stephen Gaynor School
- The School at Columbia
- Town School
- Trevor Day School
- Village Community School

== See also ==
- Ivy Preparatory School League
- History of education in New York City
