= Trinity School (New York City) =

Private prep school in New York, US

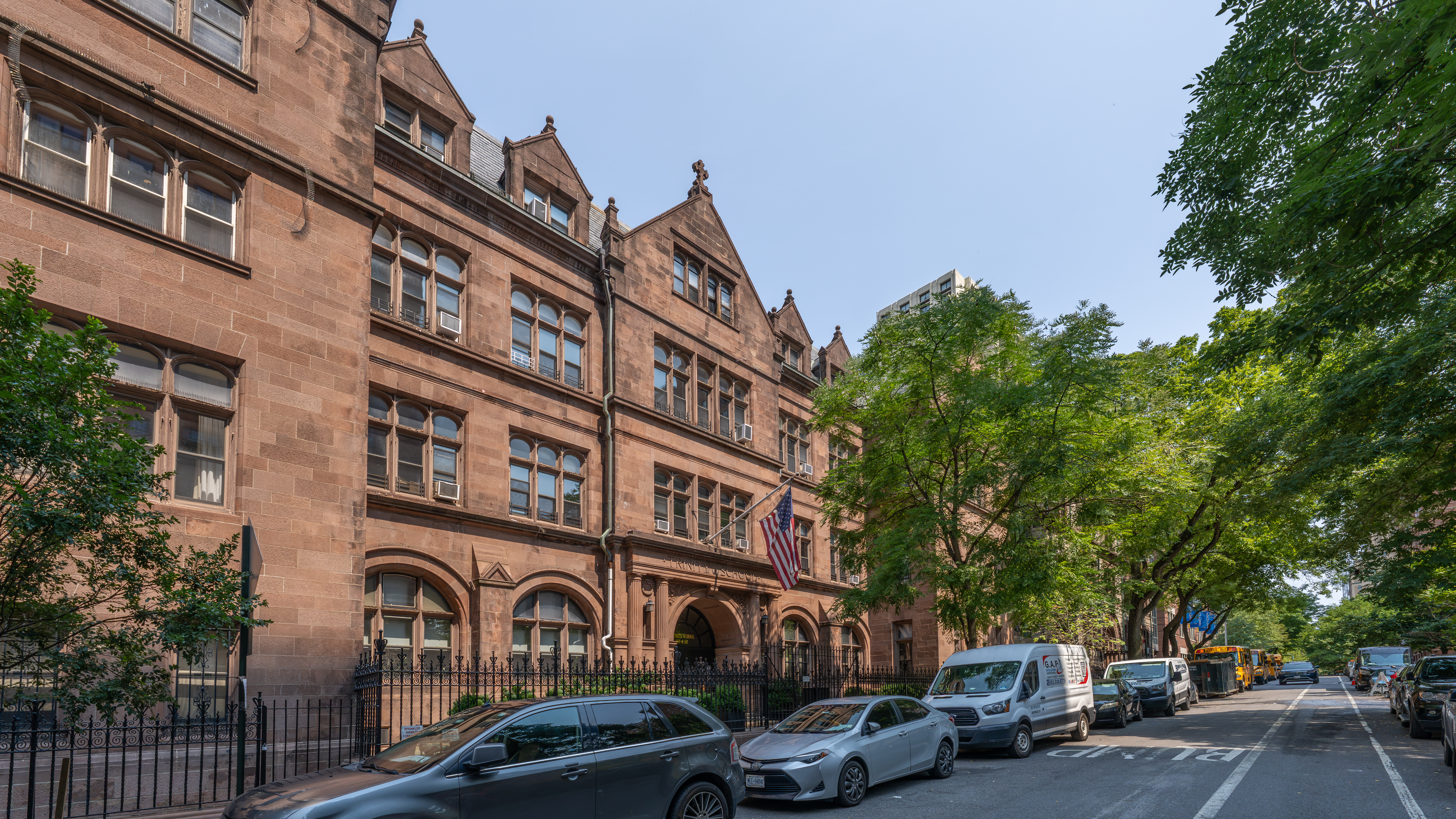

Location
- 139 West 91st Street; New York, New York 10024-1399; United States; 40°47′25″N 73°58′15″W

Information
- School type: Independent
- Motto: Labore et virtute (By hard work and excellence)
- Founded: 1709; 317 years ago
- Founder: William Huddleston
- Head of school: Alexis Mulvihill
- Grades: K–12
- Gender: Co-educational
- Enrollment: 995
- Student to teacher ratio: 6:1
- Schedule: Day
- Colors: Blue and gold
- Athletics conference: Ivy Prep School League
- Mascot: Tiger
- Accreditation: NYSAIS
- Newspaper: The Trinity Times
- Yearbook: The Bruner
- Annual tuition: $64,100-64,300 (2023–24)
- Affiliation: New York Interschool
- Website: trinityschoolnyc.org

Trinity School (also known as Trinity) is an independent, preparatory, and co-educational day school for grades K–12, on the Upper West Side of Manhattan in New York City, and a member of both the New York Interschool and the Ivy Preparatory School League.

Founded in 1709 in the old Trinity Church at Broadway and Wall Street, the school is the fifth oldest in the United States and the oldest continually operational school in New York City.

== History ==
Trinity School traces its founding to 1709, when founder William Huddleston opened the school to teach poor children in the parish of Trinity Church. Huddleston obtained books and funding for the school from the Society for the Propagation of the Gospel in London. The school's first classes met in Trinity Church at the head of Wall Street; the first schoolhouse was built on church grounds in 1749. The building burned down two months later and had to be rebuilt. Columbia University, then King's College, was founded in that building's first floor. The first Trinity students, boys and girls, in addition to religious instruction, also learned to write plainly and legibly and were taught enough arithmetic to prepare them for employment. These eighteenth-century Trinity students were almost invariably apprenticed to trades such as blacksmith, bookbinder, carpenter, cordwainer, mason, mariner, shoe binder, and tailor.

In 1789, Trinity's 56 boys and 30 girls were under the instruction of John Wood, clerk of St. Paul's Chapel at 29 John Street. Its tuition stood at seven dollars per quarter, in addition to a one guinea entrance fee. In 1838, Trinity closed admission to girls. Girls would not be readmitted until 1971. In 1889, Trinity School moved to 627 Madison Avenue (at 59th Street), and moved again a year later to 108 West 45th Street. In 1898, the trustees established the St. Agatha's School for Girls at 257 West 93rd Street as a sister school for Trinity. St. Agatha's eventually closed.

During its first two hundred years, Trinity moved many times as the population of both Manhattan and the School grew. The establishment, in the nineteenth century, of a public school system in New York meant that the role of the charity school had come to an end. English and classical learning became the rule as the school increased in size to as many as 250 students and as Trinity refashioned itself as a college preparatory school for boys. The curriculum was designed to meet the admissions standards of the leading colleges and universities of the time.

In 1895, Trinity moved to its current location at 91st Street between Amsterdam and Columbus Avenues on the Upper West Side of Manhattan. Trinity currently occupies seven connected buildings: 151 and 149 West 91st Street house the admissions, advancement, and business offices; 139 West 91st houses the Lower School; 121 West 91st Street houses the Lower School language labs, Middle School Science Labs, and the Morse Theater; 115 West 91st houses the Middle School and two gymnasia; and 101 West 91st houses the Upper School, the two swimming pools, and the John McEnroe '77 Tennis Courts (opened in 2012), and in 2017 the school opened a 65,000 square foot addition, adding new science labs, classrooms, and a new performing arts center.

Shortly before the completion of the new upper school building in 1968, Trinity severed its Episcopal ties with Trinity Church, and is now non-sectarian, thus receiving no endowment from the Church. The school does, however, retain an Episcopal priest who is paid by Trinity Church. The priest delivers weekly chapel services at the school, as well as the annual baccalaureate service held at Trinity Church each May.

Forbes Magazine named Trinity the country's best private school in 2010. In 2004, The Wall Street Journal ranked Trinity as third best at getting its students accepted to some of the country's most exclusive colleges. Under the leadership of John Allman, Trinity has tried to address some of the class and elitism issues that plague the school given the shift from its origins, and continues to build on their decade-long attempts to address diversity.

== Academics ==
The Lower and Middle School courseloads are highly structured, and ninth and tenth graders are offered limited flexibility in their courses. Juniors and seniors are freer to flexibly select electives and other such courses. English is the only subject mandated through four years in the Upper School. Math is mandated for three, and the lab sciences for two. There is a requirement for a religion, philosophy, or ethics course and Physical Education. Trinity is also notable for having a full Classics department. Nearly 40% of the student body takes either Latin or Greek, while more than 60% take two languages.

== Athletics ==
Trinity is a member of the Ivy Preparatory School League and the New York State Association of Independent Schools (NYSAIS). The school competes in the New York State Association of Independent Schools Athletic Association (NYSAISAA). Championships in this league are used as qualifiers for overall state championships.

- Girls' volleyball – 1997, 2012
- Baseball – 2006
- Basketball – 2007, 2009, 2023
- Girls' soccer – 2009
- Boys' cross country – 2016, 2017, 2018, 2023
- Girls' cross country – 2019, 2021
- Boys' soccer – 2017, 2018
- Boys' Indoor track and field – 2018, 2019, 2020, 2022, 2023
- Girls' Indoor track and field – 2019, 2022
- Boys' Outdoor track and field – 2022
- Boys' swimming – 2020, 2022, 2023
- Girls' swimming – 2020
- Wrestling – 2024

== Performing arts ==
Trinity School has musical groups ranging from instrumental music – jazz groups, orchestras, and chamber ensembles – to vocal music – choruses, both accompanied and a cappella. Musical performances figure in all divisions with concerts, assemblies, and chapel performances during the school day and in the evening.

== Notable students ==
- Bill Berkson: Poet, critic and editor
- Jake Bernstein 1987: Pulitzer Prize-winning investigative journalist and author
- Humphrey Bogart: Actor
- William Gage Brady Jr. 1904: Chairman of National City Bank
- Alvin Bragg: Attorney and politician
- Nick Bruel 1983: Author and illustrator
- Truman Capote: Novelist and screenwriter
- Jim Carroll 1968: Author, poet, autobiographer and punk musician
- Reed Diamond 1985: Actor
- David Ebersman 1987: Former CFO of Genentech and Facebook
- Ansel Elgort: Actor, singer
- Tanaz Eshaghian (born 1974), Iranian-born American documentary filmmaker
- David Faber 1981: Financial journalist on CNBC
- Daniel Garodnick 1990: Representative, New York City Council, 4th District
- Russell Gewirtz 1983: Screenwriter, Inside Man
- Caroline Giuliani: Filmmaker, writer, and daughter of Rudy Giuliani
- Frank S. Hackett: Educator, founder of Riverdale Country Day School
- Sophie B. Hawkins 1982: Singer/songwriter
- Alan Ramsay Hawley 1882: Early aviator
- Amy Helm: Singer/songwriter
- Warren Hoge 1959: United Nations bureau chief, The New York Times
- Lloyd Kaufman 1964: Independent filmmaker and producer, founder of Troma Studios
- William P. Lauder 1978: Executive chairman of Estée Lauder Companies
- Sir Michael Lindsay-Hogg: Stage and television director, actor, writer
- Stacy London 1987: Fashion consultant and co-host of TLC's What Not to Wear
- Yo Yo Ma: Cellist
- John McEnroe 1977: Professional tennis player and media personality
- Patrick McEnroe 1984: Professional tennis player and sports commentator
- John Hine Mundy 1936: British American medievalist, professor at Columbia University
- James Murdoch: Media
- Lachlan Murdoch: Media
- Zak Penn 1986: Screenwriter
- Najla Said 1992: Palestinian-American author, actress, playwright, and activist
- Aram Saroyan 1962: Minimalist poet
- Eric Schneiderman 1972: Former New York State Attorney General
- Eric Shawn 1975: Television reporter
- Michael Shure 1984: TV political correspondent and host, The War Room with Michael Shure
- Ben Smith (journalist) 1995: Editor-in-chief of BuzzFeed
- Oliver Stone: Film director
- Eric Trump: Businessman, son of Donald Trump
- Katrina vanden Heuvel 1977: Editor of The Nation
- Emily Warren 2011: Singer and multi-platinum, Grammy winning songwriter
- Colson Whitehead 1987: Two-time Pulitzer Prize-winning novelist and MacArthur Fellowship recipient
- Charles Wuorinen 1956: Composer
- Katharine Zaleski 1999: Co-founder of PowerToFly
- Daniel M. Ziff 1989: Billionaire businessman, heir of Ziff Davis publishing
- Dirk Edward Ziff 1981: Billionaire businessman, heir of Ziff Davis publishing
