= Town School =

Town School may refer to:

- The Town School, a school in New York City, US, founded in 1913
- Town School for Boys, a school San Francisco, US, founded in 1939
