= History of education in New York City =

The history of education in New York City includes schools and schooling from the colonial era to the present. It includes public and private schools, as well as higher education. Annual city spending on public schools quadrupled from $250 million in 1946 to $1.1 billion in 1960. It reached $38 billion in 2022, or $38,000 per public school student. For recent history see Education in New York City.

== Colonial ==
There was limited public education during the British colonial period especially in the South and in rural areas.

Prior to the American Revolution, Columbia University, then called King's College, was the only institution of higher education in New York City. It was one of 9 Colonial colleges founded before the Revolution.

== 1776 to 1898 ==
New York was one of the last major cities to set up a public school system. State funds were available, but they were distributed to private organizations running private schools. Families that could afford it hired tutors for their children. In the early Republic, various elite societies emerged to promote education among marginal groups.

The New York Manumission Society was established in 1785 by antislavery activists, including John Jay and Alexander Hamilton. Its stated goals were to alleviate the injustices of slavery, protect the rights of Blacks, and provide them with free educational opportunities. In 1787 it set up the African Free School. This school expanded over time, enrolling over 700 students by 1815. It received support from the city and the state.

In 1805 the Free School Society, organized by philanthropists, was chartered by the state legislature to teach poor children. It received grants from the city and the state and, starting in 1815, funding from the new State Common School Fund. By 1826 it was renamed the Public School Society and operated eight schools with 345 pupils, with separate departments for boys and girls. They were taught reading, writing, arithmetic, and religion. Although a private organization, the Public School Society dominated the educational scene, enrolling thousands of pupils in a system that grew to 74 schools.

By 1834, its schools were integrated into the Public School Society. In 1801, the city's Quakers formed the Association of Women Friends for the Relief of the Poor, hired an educated and moral widow as an instructor, and opened the first free school for poor white children. It grew to 750 students by 1823 and received some financial aid from the city or state.

In 1853 the Free School Society became part of the new public school system when it was absorbed by the New York City Board of Education.

In 1829 there were 43,000 children ages 5 to 15 in a city of 200,000. About half were poor and did not get any formal schooling. About 14,000 paid tuition to attend one of the many nonsectarian private schools. Some 4,000 attended church-sponsored schools, such as the Collegiate School, founded by the Dutch in 1628). And 5,000 attended public elementary schools. (There were no public high schools. Working-class youth who had some schooling seldom stayed after age 14, when they started work or became apprentices. The "Free Academy of the City of New York", the first public high school, was established in 1847 by a wealthy businessman and president of the Board of Education Townsend Harris. It included both a high school and a college. There was no tuition; one goal was to provide access to a good education based on the student's merits alone. The conservative Whig Party denounced the school, while Tammany Hall and the Democrats endorsed the plan, and voters gave it 85% approval in a referendum. The Free Academy later dropped its high school and transformed into City College of New York. Other cities had moved much sooner to establish high schools: Boston (1829), Philadelphia (1838), and Baltimore (1839).

=== The Catholic issue ===
The Catholic bishop of New York, John J. Hughes in 1840-1842 led a political battle to secure funding for the Catholic schools. He rallied support from both the Tammany Hall Democrats, and the opposition Whig Party, whose leaders, especially Governor William H. Seward supported Hughes. He argued Catholics paid double for schools—they paid taxes to subsidize private schools they could not use and also paid for the parochial schools they did use. Catholics could not use Public School Society schools because they forced students to listen to readings from the Protestant King James Bible which were designed to undermine their Catholic faith. With the Maclay Act in 1842, the New York State legislature established the New York City Board of Education. It gave the city an elective Board of Education empowered to build and supervise schools and distribute the education fund. It provided that no money should go to the schools that taught religion, so Hughes lost his battle.

=== Catholic parochial system ===
Bishop Hughes turned inward: he founded an independent Catholic school system in the city. His new system included the first Catholic college in the Northeast, St. John's College, now Fordham University. By 1870 19 percent of the city's children were attending Catholic schools.

Increasingly American-born Irish women attended high schools and normal schools in preparation for a teaching career. The supply allowed the diocese to create many new Catholic elementary schools. After 1870 20 percent of the teachers in the city's public schools were Irish. Teaching "had status,” explained a teacher whose parents were immigrants from Ireland. “[You were] looked up to...like a doctor.”

Many of the young immigrant or American-born women joined religious orders. French Catholic orders also established branches in the United States. The nuns were assigned to teach in parochial schools or to work in hospitals and orphanages. One prominent leader was Mother Marie Joseph Butler (1860–1940), an Irish-born Catholic sister who dedicated her life to establishing schools and colleges. In the early 20th century she founded 14 schools, including Marymount School and College in Tarrytown, New York, a suburb of New York City. She established 14 schools, 3 of them colleges, in the United States. Her conviction of the educational value of international experience led her to establish the first study abroad program through Marymount College.

=== Progressive era, 1890s to 1920s ===
By 1860, elementary teaching was a female role, especially in the Northeast with rates of 80% of more females in both urban and rural areas, reaching 89% statewide in New York in 1915. A high school education was the normal requirement. In 1860, about 90% were under age 30, and half were under 25. By 1930, nearly all had started college and 22% had a college degree.

Immigration from Eastern Europe soared after 1880, as did enrollments of Jews, Italians and others. Enrollment in the elementary schools soared from 250,000 in 1881 (including Brooklyn) to 494,000 in 1899, and 792,000 in 1914, when immigration ended. While the number of schools held steady at about 500, the number of teachers doubled from 9,300 in 1899 to 20,000 in 1914. High school enrollment soared from 14,000 in 1899 to 68,000 in 1914. One immigrant from Germany in 1857 was Felix Adler (1851–1933). Adler returned to Germany for a PhD from Heidelberg University; at a time only Harvard had a PhD program. He served as a professor of philosophy at Columbia University, 1902–1933. His Society for Ethical Culture promoted numerous educational reforms in the city. They founded a high school for gifted youth, and a teacher training school. They promoted vocational schools that taught basic manual trades. Adler was a national leader in the battle against child labor, and organized advanced studies of children.

Hunter College was founded in 1870 as the Female Normal and High School, to train young women as teachers in elementary schools. The Industrial Education Association, formed in 1884, promoted manual training courses in the new high schools, and it emphasized the need for more advanced teacher training. It helped found a Teachers College, which became a unit of Columbia University in 1898. It gained a national and international reputation in pedagogy. John Dewey was a highly influential professor there from 1904 until 1930. A smaller institution was the Bureau of Educational Experiments, an independent, graduate education school that opened in 1916 and became an experimental site for innovation under the leadership of Lucy Sprague Mitchell (1878–1967). It became the Bank Street College of Education in 1950.

=== Conflict over the Gary Plan ===
In 1914, New York City hired William Wirt superintendent of schools in Gary, Indiana since 1907 as a part-time consultant to introduce the work-study-play system in the public schools. The plan involved teacher hiring standards, the design of school buildings, lengthening the school day, and organizing the schools according to his ideals. The core of the schools' organization in Gary centered upon the platoon or work-study-play system and Americanizing the 63.4 percent of children with parents who were immigrants. The theory behind the Gary Plan was to accommodate children's shorter attention spans, and that long hours of quiet in the classroom were not tenable.

Above the primary grades, students were divided into two platoons—one platoon used the academic classrooms (which were deemphasized), while the second platoon was divided between the shops, nature studies, auditorium, gymnasium, and outdoor facilities split between girls and boys. Students spent only half of their school time in a conventional classroom. "Girls learned cooking, sewing, and bookkeeping while the boys learning metalwork, cabinetry, woodworking, painting, printing, shoemaking, and plumbing." In the Gary plan, all of the school equipment remained in use during the entire school day; Rather than opening up new schools for the overwhelming population of students, it was hoped that the "Gary Plan would save [a] city money by utilizing all rooms in existing schools by rotating children through classrooms, auditoriums, playgrounds, and gymnasiums."

In the following three years, however, the Gary system encountered resistance from students, parents, and labor leaders in New York City, concerned that the plan simply trained children to work in factories and the fact that Gary's Plan was in predominantly Jewish areas. In part because of backing from the Rockefeller family, the plan became heavily identified with the interest of big business. "In January 1916, the Board of Education released a report finding students attending Gary Plan schools performed worse than those in 'non-Garyuzed schools' ."

Mayor John Purroy Mitchel was a reformer who wanted the Gary Plan in city schools. In 1914 there were 20,000 teachers handling 800,000 students in the city's public schools, which had a budget of $44 million. Mitchel argued the Gary Plan was ideal for the students and the community, and assured business it would lower costs since two platoons a day would use the buildings. Fierce opposition by the unions and the Jewish community to the Gary Plan was a major factor in defeating Mitchel's bid for reelection in 1917.

== After 1917 ==
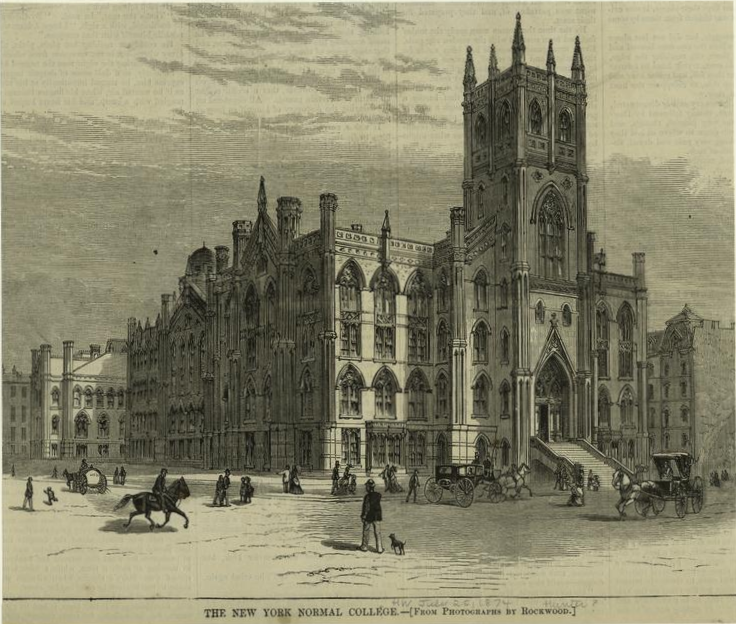
1874 view of Female Normal and High School, founded in 1870. It was renamed Normal College of the City of New York in 1888, and Hunter College in 1914.

=== Teachers organize ===
Two unions of New York schoolteachers, the Teachers Union, founded in 1916, and the Teachers Guild, founded in 1935, failed to gather widespread enrollment or support. Many of the early leaders were pacifists or socialists and thus frequently met with clashes against more right-leaning newspapers and organizations of the time, as red-baiting was fairly common. The ethnically and ideologically diverse teachers associations of the city made the creation of a single organized body difficult, with each association continuing to vie for its own priorities irrespective of the others.

=== United Federation of Teachers ===
The UFT was founded in 1960, largely in response to perceived unfairness in the educational system's treatment of teachers. Pensions were awarded to retired teachers only if they were over 65 or had 35 years of service. Female teachers faced two years of mandatory unpaid maternity leave after they gave birth. Principals could discipline or fire teachers with almost no oversight. The schools, experiencing a massive influx of baby boomer students, often were on double or triple sessions. Despite being college-educated professionals often holding master's degrees, teachers drew a salary of $66 per week, or in 2005 dollars, the equivalent of $21,000 a year.

The UFT was created on March 16, 1960, and grew rapidly. On November 7, 1960, the union organized a major strike. The strike largely failed in its main objectives but obtained some concessions, as well as bringing much popular attention to the union. After much further negotiation, the UFT was chosen as the collective bargaining organization for all city teachers in December 1961.

Albert Shanker, a controversial but successful organizer was president of the UFT from 1964 until 1984. He held an overlapping tenure as president of the national American Federation of Teachers from 1974 to his death in 1997.

==== Teacher strike 1968 ====
In 1968, the UFT went on strike and shut down the school system in May and then again from September to November to protest the decentralization plan that was being put in place to give neighborhoods more community control. The Ocean Hill-Brownsville strike focused on the Ocean Hill-Brownsville neighborhood of Brooklyn. The Ocean Hill-Brownsville crisis was a turning point in the history of unionism and of civil rights, as it created a rift between African-Americans and the Jewish communities, two groups that were previously allied politically in the liberal wing of the Democratic Party. The two sides threw accusations of racism and anti-Semitism at each other.

Following the 1975 New York City fiscal crisis, some 14,000 teachers were laid off and class size soared. Another strike addressed some of these complaints and gave long-serving teachers longevity benefits.

=== 21st century ===
==== Mayor Bloomberg 2002–2013 ====
After winning election, Bloomberg convinced the state legislature to grant him authority over the city's public school system. From 1968 until 2002, New York City's schools were managed by the Board of Education, which had seven members. Only two of the seven were appointed by the mayor, which meant the city had a minority of representatives on the board and the mayor's ability to shape education policy was greatly diminished. In addition to the Board, 25 local school boards also played a part in running the system. In 2002, at Bloomberg's urging, the local boards and Board of Education were abolished and replaced with a new mayoral agency, the New York City Department of Education.

Bloomberg appointed Joel Klein as Schools Chancellor to run the new department. Under Bloomberg and Chancellor Klein, test scores rose, and the City obtained a higher percentage of funding from the state budget. Graduation rates also increased. Bloomberg opposed social promotion, and favored after-school and summer-school programs to help schoolchildren catch up, rather than allowing them to advance to the next grade level where they may be unprepared. Despite often tense relations with teachers' unions, he avoided a teacher strike by concluding a contract negotiation in which teachers received an average raise of 15% in exchange for givebacks and productivity increases. Teachers overall got a 43 percent salary increase

Bloomberg enforced a strengthened cell-phone ban in city schools that had its roots dating to a 1988 school system ban on pagers. The ban is controversial among some parents, who are concerned with their ability to contact their children. Administration representatives noted that students are distracted in class by cell phones and often use them inappropriately, in some instances sending and receiving text messages, taking photographs, surfing the Internet, and playing video games, and that cell-phone bans exist in other cities including Detroit and Philadelphia.

On May 27, 2007, Bloomberg announced that the four-year high school graduation rate in New York City had reached 60%, the highest level since the city began calculating the rate in 1986 and an 18% increase since the Mayor assumed control of the public schools in 2002.

On June 30, 2009, mayoral control lapsed as the New York State Senate declined to renew it. However, mayoral control was restored less than two months later, with a few amendments. Mayoral control allows New York's mayor to have, in practice, complete control of the school system.

==== Mayor de Blasio 2014–2021 ====
Bill de Blasio served as the Mayor of New York City from 2014 to 2021. Universal Pre-Kindergarten was his signature achievement, providing free, full-day pre-kindergarten to all of the city's four-year-olds. There was also expansion of programs for three-year-olds. De Blasio implemented various programs aimed at addressing inequalities in the public school system, including expanding access to computer science, AP classes, and college access programs in all high schools. Despite efforts to promote equity, the racial achievement gap in New York City's public schools reportedly widened during his time in office. The schools were shut down during the COVID-19 epidemic of 2020–2022, as demanded by the teachers.

== See also ==
- New York City Department of Education
- New York City Schools Chancellor § List of New York City Schools chancellors
- List of schools in the Roman Catholic Archdiocese of New York
  - List of Catholic schools in New York
- New York Interschool, elite private schools in Manhattan.
  - Ivy Preparatory School League
- Teachers College, Columbia University
- Council of School Supervisors & Administrators: trade union representing supervisors in NYC schools
- Teachers Union (1916–1964)
- Teachers Guild (1935–1960). merged into UFT
- United Federation of Teachers (UFT, 1960 – present)
  - American Federation of Teachers nationwide; UFT is member
  - New York State United Teachers, statewide; UFT is member
  - New York City teachers' strike of 1968, UFT responding to teachers fired in Ocean City-Brownsville
