= Dalton School =

Private prep school in New York City

Coordinates: 40°46′53.6″N 73°57′18.2″W

Location
- Middle & High School: 108 East 89th Street; First Program: 53 East 91st Street; New York City, NY; United States

Information
- Type: Private; Independent; college-preparatory; day school
- Motto: Go Forth Unafraid
- Religious affiliation: Nonsectarian
- Established: 1919; 107 years ago
- Founder: Helen Parkhurst
- CEEB code: 333580
- Head of school: José De Jesús
- Faculty: Approx. 250
- Grades: K–12
- Gender: Co-educational
- Enrollment: Approx. 1300
- Campus type: Urban
- Colors: Blue and white
- Athletics conference: Ivy Preparatory School League
- Mascot: Ivan the Tiger
- Nickname: Tigers
- Accreditation: NAIS, NYSAIS
- Newspaper: The Daltonian
- Endowment: $289 million (2025)
- Tuition: $67,480 (2025-26)
- Affiliations: NAIS; NYSAIS; New York Interschool; Global Online Academy
- Website: dalton.org

The Dalton School, originally the Children's University School, is a private, coeducational college preparatory school in New York City and a member of both the Ivy Preparatory School League and the New York Interschool. The school is located in four buildings within the Upper East Side of Manhattan. In the 2024–25 academic year, tuition rates totaled $64,300.

== History ==
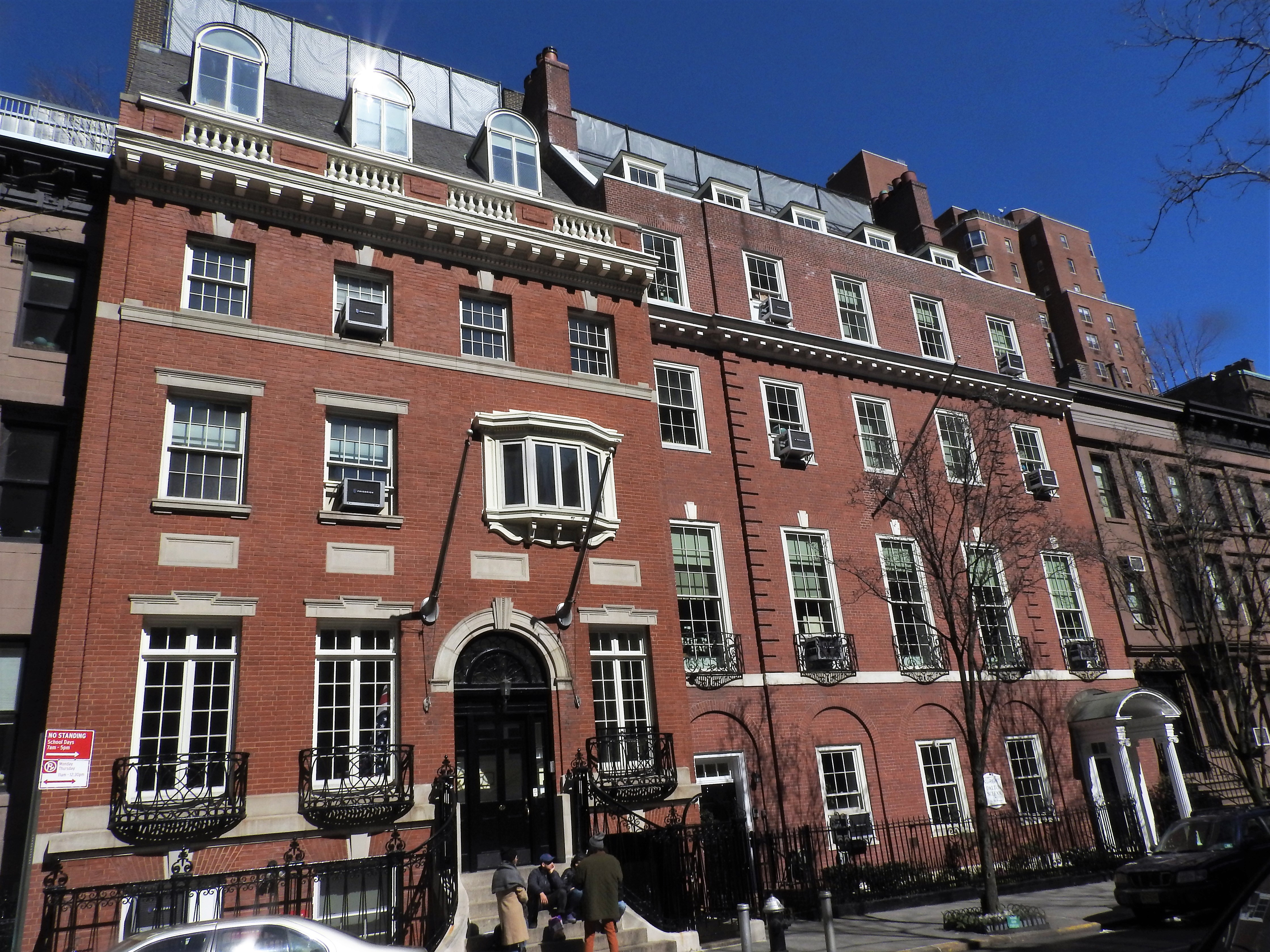
91st Street "Little Dalton"

The Dalton School, originally called the Children's University School, was founded by Helen Parkhurst in 1919. After experimentation in her own one-room school with Maria Montessori, Parkhurst visited other progressive schools in Europe including Bedales School and its founder and headmaster John Haden Badley in England. She developed what she called the Dalton Plan, which encouraged teachers and students to work together toward individualized goals. The Laboratory Plan was first put into effect as an experiment in the high school of Dalton, Massachusetts, in 1916. The estate of her benefactor Josephine Porter Boardman, was also near the town of Dalton and from this beginning the Laboratory Plan and school eventually took their names.

In 1919, Helen Parkhurst relocated to New York City, where she opened her first school on West 74th Street. Larger facilities soon became necessary; the Lower School was moved to West 72nd Street, and the High School opened in the autumn of 1929 in the current building at 108 East 89th Street. Eleanor Roosevelt admired the work of Helen Parkhurst and played an important role in expanding the population and resources of the school by promoting a merger between the Todhunter School for girls (founded by Winifred Todhunter) and Dalton in 1939.

Enlarged and modified through the years, Dalton still celebrates many traditions like lighting candles before winter break and holding a Greek Festival. Academically, the school still subscribes to the Dalton Plan, which Parkhurst helped to create. Over the years, the Dalton Plan has been adopted by schools around the world, including schools in Australia, Austria, Belgium, Chile, the Czech Republic, Hong Kong, Japan, and the Netherlands.

== Admission ==
Parental anxiety created by the highly competitive admission process was the subject of press coverage from 1999 to 2001. Long seen as a bastion of privilege, Dalton's efforts to broaden its mandate for diversity have met with some difficulty. In 2010, a financial aid budget of $6.5 million supported an outreach program for socio-economic diversity at the school. As of 2008, students of color made up 38% of the Dalton First Program. In the 2008–2009 school year, the kindergarten was composed of 44% children of color. Articles in The New York Times and The Atlantic have described difficulties experienced by some African-American children at the school.

American Promise was a PBS documentary that followed two African American students who enrolled at Dalton as kindergartners and the challenges they faced due to Dalton's lack of diversity. In 2020, Dalton found itself in controversy during the broader diversity, equity, and inclusion movement that followed the murder of George Floyd. The discussions continued into the following school year and resulted in the departure of school head Jim Best.

== Notable people ==
Alumni

- Ronnie Abrams, US judge
- Dan Barber, chef
- Antony Blinken, former U.S. Secretary of State
- Ruthie Blum, Israeli-American journalist. (Did not graduate; transferred to Bronx High School of Science.)
- Montgomery Clift, actor
- Anderson Cooper, journalist
- Rachel Covey, actress
- Claire Danes, actress
- Edgar de Evia, photographer
- Samuel R. Delany, writer
- Blu DeTiger, musician
- Maxim Dlugy, chess grandmaster
- Shaun Donovan, former U.S. Secretary of Housing and Urban Development and Director of the Office of Management and Budget
- Edward Downes, musicologist and radio quizmaster
- Naomi Ekperigin, writer and comedian
- Noah Emmerich, actor
- Mark Feuerstein, actor
- Frances FitzGerald, journalist
- Barrett Foa, actor
- Helen Frankenthaler, painter
- Laura Geller, rabbi
- Alexis Glick, television personality
- Sam Gold, theater artist
- Carol Grace, actress
- Jennifer Grey, actress
- Vanessa Grigoriadis, journalist
- Jefferson Y. Han, research scientist
- Hannah Higgins, writer
- Marni Hodgkin, editor
- A. J. Jacobs, journalist
- Jason Jorjani, writer
- Max Joseph, filmmaker
- Joshua Katz, classicist
- Brooks Kerr, jazz pianist
- Rachel Kovner, United States federal judge
- Dylan Lauren, businesswoman
- Clyde Lawrence, musician
- Gracie Lawrence, musician
- Steve Lemme, actor
- Sean Lennon, musician
- Andrew Levitas, painter and sculptor
- J. Kenji López-Alt, chef and food writer
- Jenny Lumet, actress and #MeToo activist
- Mary Stuart Masterson, actress
- Helly Nahmad, art dealer
- Jennifer O'Neill, actress
- Morgan Pehme, filmmaker, journalist
- John Podhoretz, writer, editor of Commentary
- Tracy Pollan, actress
- Dara Resnik, screenwriter and producer
- Simon Rich, writer
- James B. Rosenwald III, entrepreneur
- Matthew Ross, film director, screenwriter, journalist
- Marco Roth, editor and founder of N+1 magazine
- Melissa Russo, journalist
- Eric Schlosser, journalist
- Marian Seldes, actress
- Wallace Shawn, actor, playwright
- Fazal Sheikh, photographer
- Christian Slater, actor
- Marina Squerciati, actress
- Jill Stuart, fashion designer
- Emma Sulkowicz, performance artist
- Veronica Vasicka, record label founder and DJ
- Josh Waitzkin, chess player
- Dean Wareham, musician
- Julie Warner, actress
- Sharon Washington, actress and playwright
- Bokeem Woodbine, actor
- David Yassky, Director, New York City Taxi and Limousine Commission.
- Matt Yglesias, writer
- Laurie Schwab Zabin, public health researcher and professor
- Andrew Zimmern, chef

Head of School

José Manuel De Jesús became Head of School in 2022. Former Head of School Jim Best resigned in 2021 after 16 years at the school.

Faculty

- Donald Barr, headmaster c. 1964–74
- Joe Frank, taught literature and philosophy 1965–1975; radio performer, writer.
- Rhys Caparn, art instructor 1946–1972
- Jeffrey Epstein, taught advanced physics and mathematics c. 1974–76. Financier; convicted child sex offender
- Yves Volel, taught c. 1968–85. Lawyer, activist, assassinated while running for Haitian presidency
- Liz Williamson, dance teacher
- Melissa Zexter, photography instructor

== See also ==
- History of education in New York City
