= Melissa Zexter =

American artist

- Born: Providence, Rhode Island
- Education: Rhode Island School of Design, BFA Photography; New York University, MFA
- Known for: Embroidered photography
- Website: www.melissazexter.com

Melissa Zexter is a Brooklyn-based artist who creates embroidered photography.

== Early life and education ==
Zexter grew up in Bristol, Rhode Island in the Joseph Reynolds House and was given her first camera at the age of eight. Her father Robert Zexter was a prominent art and antiquity dealer. Melissa Zexter earned a BFA from the Rhode Island School of Design in photography. She earned her MFA in photography from New York University/International Center of Photography. She teaches photography at the Dalton School in New York. She has previously taught at Alfred University, Cooper Union, Long Island University and The New School.

== Art ==
Zexter began embroidering her photography following an artist's residency program in the Catskills. Her works typically begin with her own digital or analogical photography, to which she adds a layer of hand-stitched embroidery. The overlaid embroidery pattern in her works fits the context of the scene's theme. She uses various embroidery styles, "ranging from seemingly random stitches of different colors, to pattern-like stitches of single or complementing hues." Zexter prefers to photograph women and her themes include representations of femininity and the exploration of female identity.

Zexter's works have been reviewed and published in The New York Times, The Boston Herald, Time Out Chicago, and The New Yorker. She exhibited at the Bronx Museum of the Arts in 1994. She has also participated in exhibitions at the Muriel Guepin Gallery, Kenise Barnes Fine Art, Hallspace Gallery, Creiger Dane Gallery, Robert Mann Gallery, Triennale Design Museum, and the Marcia Wood Gallery in Atlanta.

== Exhibitions ==
- 1994 "Artist in the marketplace", Bronx Museum of the Arts, Bronx.
- 2011 "Thread, Pixels, Paper; Works by Melissa Zexter, Melinda McDaniel and Katharine Kreisher", Carrie Haddad Photographs, Hudson, NY.
- 2011 "Melissa Zexter, Lucilla Bonfante, Keun Young Park", Muriel Guepin Gallery, Brooklyn, NY.
- 2014 "The Embroidered Image", Robert Mann Gallery, New York, NY
- 2014 "Workwear" (Abiti da Lavoro), Triennale, Milan, Italy
- 2015 Bold (Feminine), Marcia Wood Gallery, Atlanta, GA
- 2017 Past and Present, Muriel Guepin Gallery, New York, NY
- 2018 "In Her Hands", Robert Mann Gallery, New York, NY
- 2019 "Home Sweet Home", Ann Street Gallery, Newburgh, NY
- 2020 "Nimble", Edward J and Helen Jane Morrison Gallery, University of Minnesota, MN
- 2021 "Tools of the Trade" Blue Spiral Gallery, Asheville, NC
- 2022 "Tactile", Delaware Arts Alliance, Narrowsburg, NY
- 2023 "PHOTOFAIRS", Robert Mann Gallery, Javits Center, NY, NY
- 2023 "Phantom Web", Delaware Valley Arts Alliance, Narrowsburg, NY
- 2024 "Memento", Secret Studio, Columbus, Ohio

== See also ==
- Maurizio Anzeri, Italian artist who is also known for embroidered photographs
