= Joseph Reynolds House =

Historic house in Rhode Island, United States

- U.S. National Register of Historic Places
- U.S. National Historic Landmark
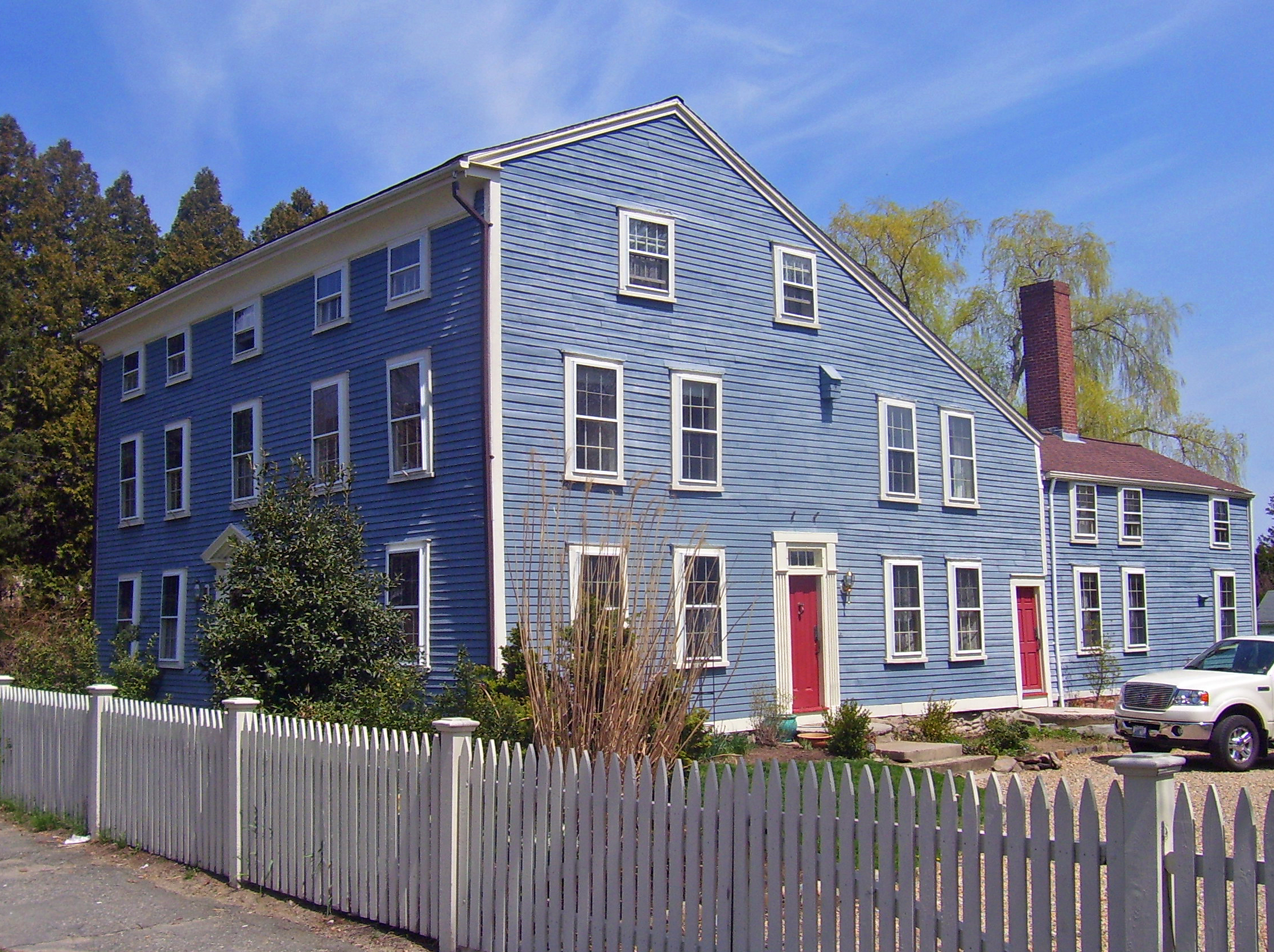
- Front elevation and south profile of house, 2008

- Location within Rhode Island Location within the United States
- Location: 956 Hope Street, Bristol, Rhode Island
- Nearest city: Providence
- Coordinates: 41°41′1″N 71°16′46″W
- Built: 1700
- Architectural style: American Colonial
- NRHP reference No.: 72000017

Significant dates
- Added to NRHP: May 31, 1972
- Designated NHL: July 28, 1983

The Joseph Reynolds House (also known as Willowmere) is a historic house at 956 Hope Street (RI 114) in Bristol, Rhode Island, United States, built c. 1698–1700. The three-story wood-frame house is one of the oldest buildings in Bristol and the oldest known three-story building in Rhode Island. It exhibits distinctive, well-preserved First Period features not found in other houses, despite an extensive history of adaptive alterations. It is further significant for its use by the Marquis de Lafayette as headquarters during the American Revolutionary War. It was designated a National Historic Landmark in 1983.

== Description ==
The main block of the house is five bays wide and three deep and is built using braced-stud construction. The roof extends lower to the rear, giving the house a classic New England saltbox appearance. The front roof line is decorated with a rare plaster cove cornice. An ell extends to the rear of the house, originally 1½ stories but raised to two stories in 1790.

The interior of the house follows a center hall plan with four rooms on each floor, two on either side of the central hall and stairwell. Two rooms on the north side of the house have wood panels with bolection molding and a marbleized finish, some of which was reproduced after fire damage sustained in 1976. The main block of the house originally had two internal chimneys, but the one on the north side was removed at an unknown date. The original south chimney was replaced c. 1820 with a smaller one. Other alterations at the same time included changes to the kitchen space in the rear ell.

== History ==
Nathaniel Reynolds was one of the original settlers of Bristol in 1680 when it was part of the Massachusetts Bay Colony. His son Joseph built this house, and also operated a tannery and gristmill on his land. It was during the ownership of the house by his son Joseph II that the Marquis de Lafayette occupied the north parlor chamber. Lafayette was a general in the Continental Army and was responsible for the defense of Bristol and Warren from September 7 to 23, 1778 during failed military operations to drive the British from occupied Newport.

The house remained in Reynolds family hands until 1927. In the 1950s, its owners converted the building into apartments, but subsequent owners restored it to single-family use and began to restore the property.

The Reynolds House was also known to be home to 4 enslaved Africans owned by Mr. Reynolds.

== Gallery ==
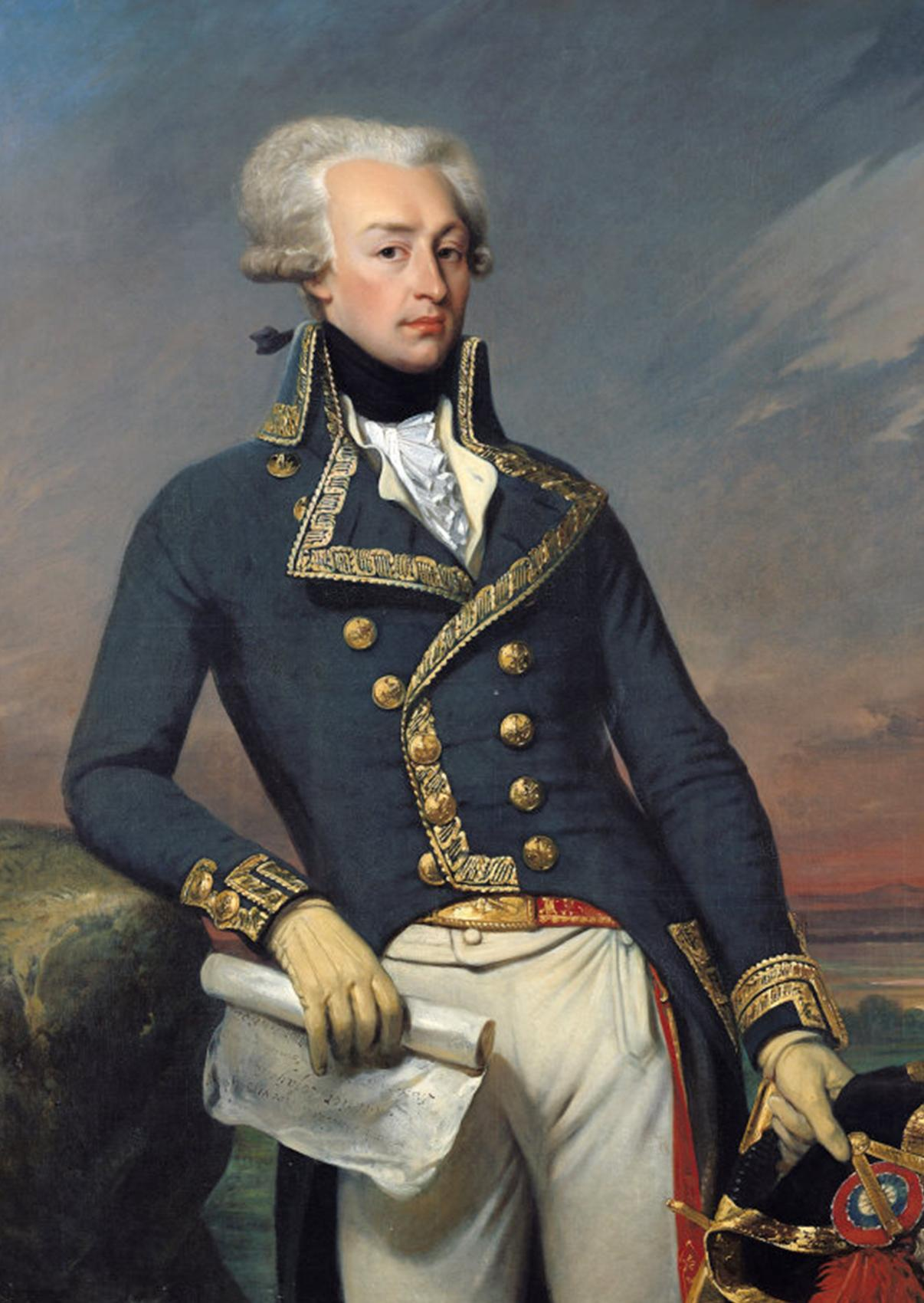
The Marquis de Lafayette used the house as headquarters during the Revolution

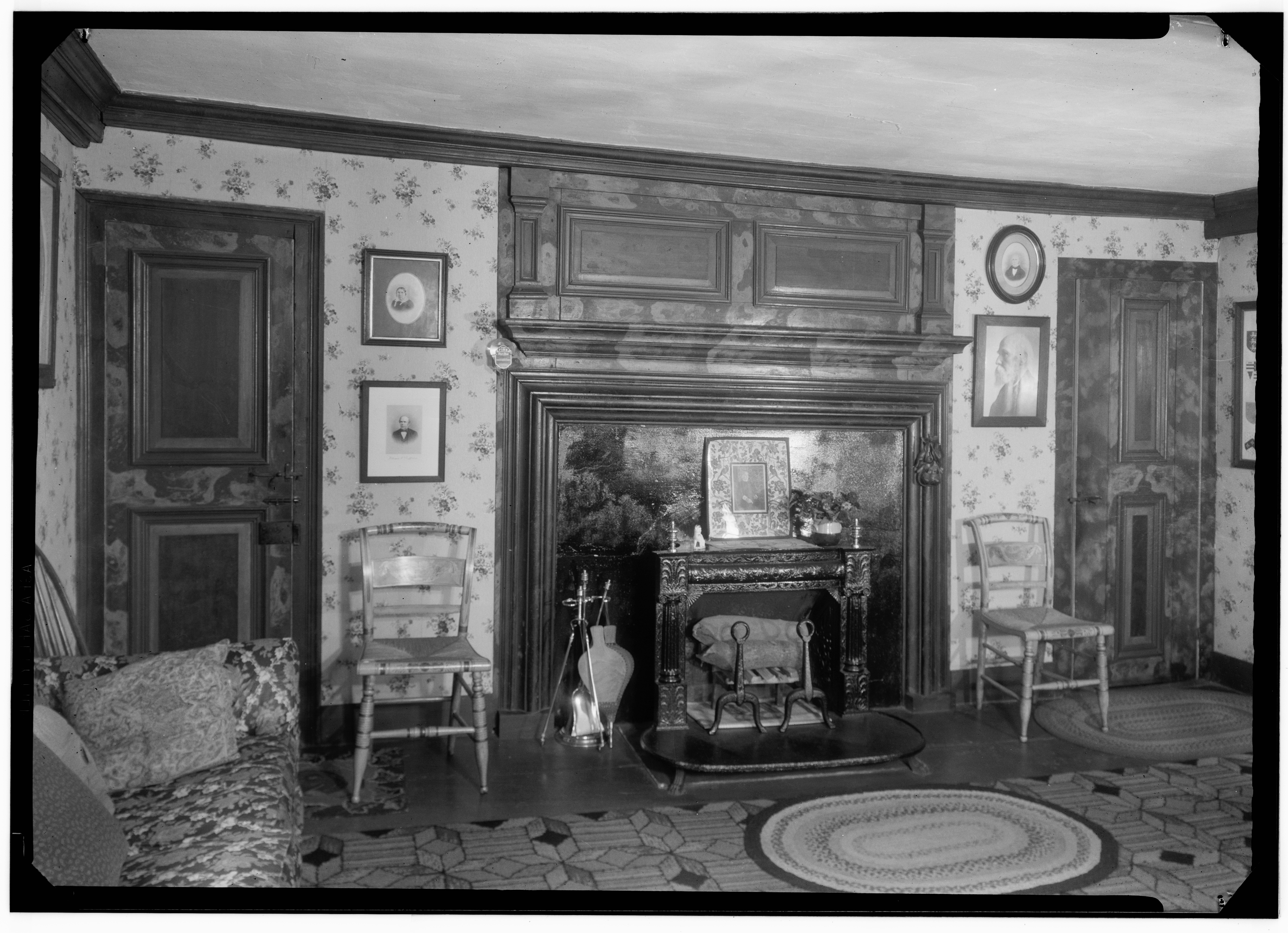
The Lafayette Room

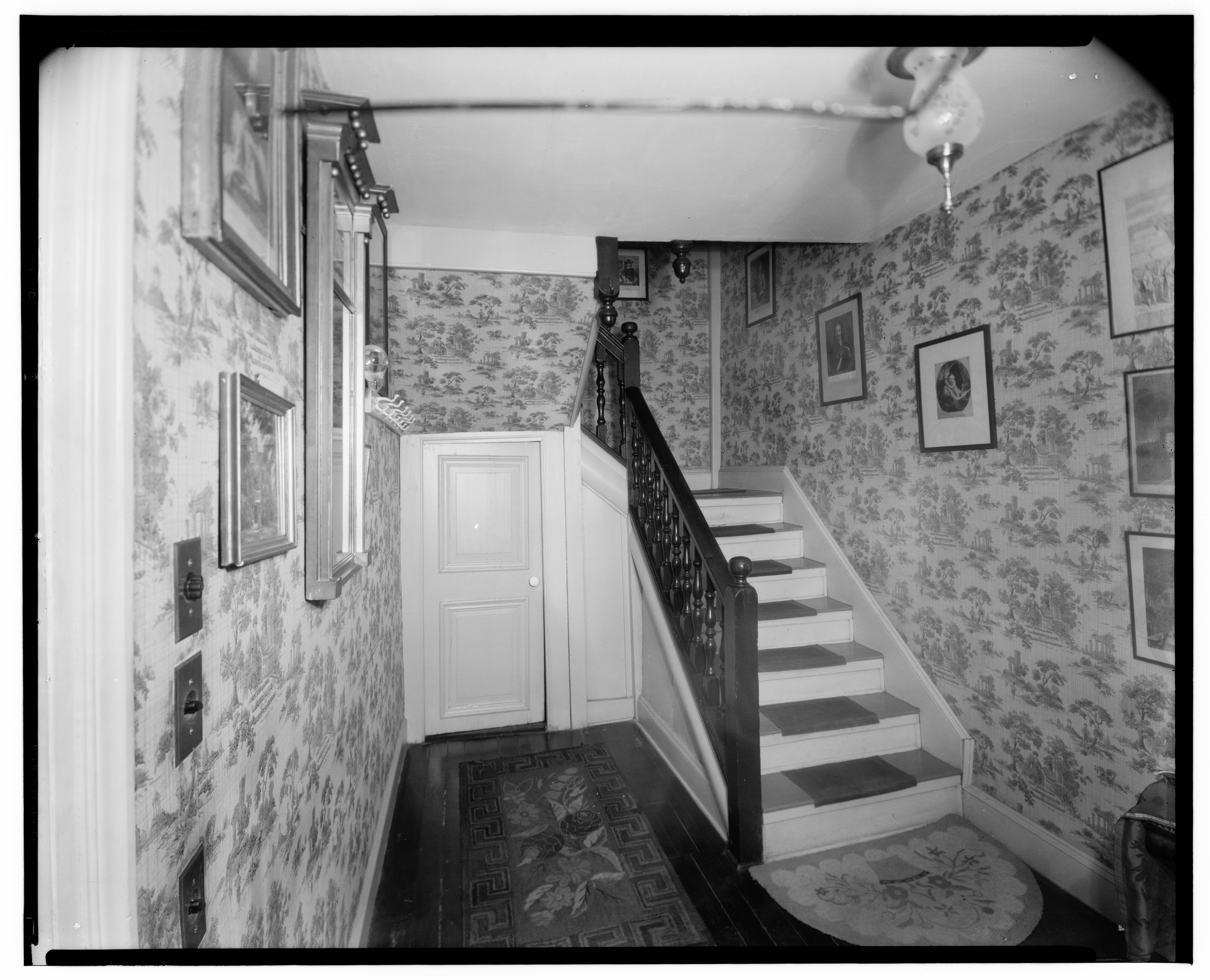
Stairway

== See also ==
- List of National Historic Landmarks in Rhode Island
- National Register of Historic Places listings in Bristol County, Rhode Island
- Melissa Zexter, American artist who grew up in the Reynolds House
