= Maurizio Anzeri =

Italian contemporary artist

Maurizio Anzeri (born 8 April 1969, in Loano, Italy) is an Italian contemporary artist living and working in London. He works in a variety of media, including sculpture, photography, drawing, and traditional craft techniques.

== Education ==
From 1996 to 1999 Anzeri attended the Camberwell College of Arts, earning a Bachelor of Arts in sculpture and graphic design. He later earned a Master of Fine Arts in sculpture from the Slade School of Fine Art in 2005.

== Practice ==
As a sculptor, Anzeri uses synthetic hair "to create slightly ominous, sentinel-like works. Piled into totemic forms, the bundled locks are simultaneously woven into curls, plaits and pleats". He produced sculptures with Alexander McQueen in 2000 and worked for a year with Isabella Blow creating wearable sculptures. Since 2005, Anzeri has exhibited his work in solo and group exhibitions across the world. His work is held in several public and private art collections.

Anzeri is described as a pioneer in the art of embroidery on found photographs. The inspiration for his craft came from seeing images of relatives mending fishing nets on the Italian coast of Loano, near Genoa, and because of his family history, he saw his "attraction to working with thread as verging on the inevitable". Fusing his earlier work with hair sculpture and his passion for old photographs, embroidery became a deliberately expressive tool for him. The publication Designboom wrote:

Anzeri’s elaborate needle-work set against somber backgrounds results in a sharp juxtaposition; and despite the history of both the technique and the images used, he produces work which treads new ground.

He conceived the term "photo-sculpture" for his embroidered photographs.

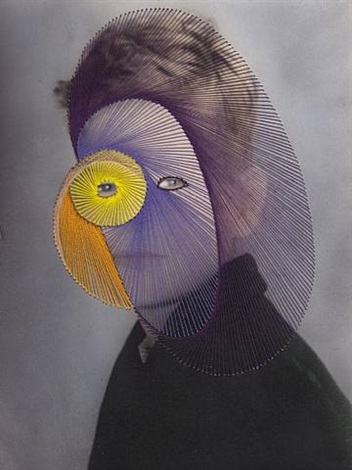
Giovanni, Maurizio Anzeri 2009 embroidery on found photo

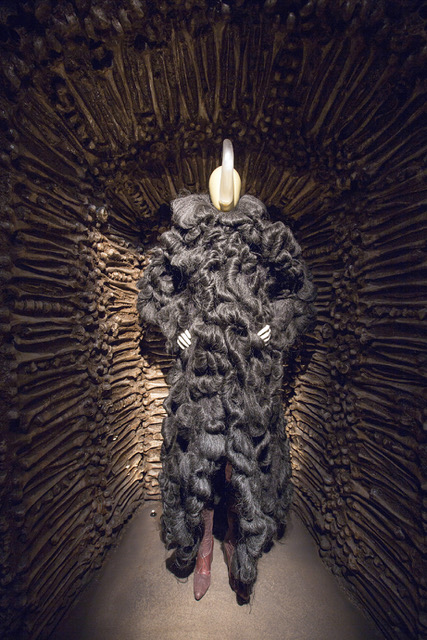
Lady Ugolino, Maurizio Anzeri 2000 - Alexander McQueen Collection, V&A Museum, London

== Notable works ==
- Lady Ugolino (2000), sculpture
- Giovanni (2009), embroidery on found photograph
- The Party (2010), a series of nine sculptures made from synthetic hair and metal.
- Profiles (2017), his first public commission of a sculpture, placed outside the Shanghai Gallery of Art as part of the exhibition The King and I.

== Exhibitions ==
In 2005, Anzeri held his final Master in Fine Arts degree show at the Slade School of Fine Art in London. After graduating he took part in several group exhibitions across Europe. Works included:

- Present traces – Tracce del presente (2000) at Museo CAMeC for the Biennale Europea Arti Visive 2006 in LaSpezia, Italy;
- Kunsthalle at the Locarno Film Festival in Locarno, Switzerland;
- Drifting Clouds at the Galleria IMAGE Furini, Arezzo, Italy;
- L’Angelo Sigillato (The Sealed Angel) at the Museo Icone Russe in Peccioli, Italy;
- The Beautiful Children at The Wharf Road Project in London, UK;
- Whispers of Immortality at the Natalia Goldin Gallery in Stockholm, Sweden.

=== 2008 ===
Anzeri was one of 30 emerging artists to be nominated for the 2008 Sovereign European Art Prize with a group exhibition at Somerset House in London. That year, he also exhibited at The Museum Of Everything in London. He also had his works exhibited at 2 other galleries:

- Starting with a photograph at the Michael Hoppen Contemporary Art Gallery in London;
- One Night in Paris for The Photographer's Gallery at PARISPHOTO in Paris and London.

=== 2009 ===
Anzeri exhibited at The Saatchi Gallery in the exhibition Newspeak: British Art Now in 2009. The exhibition received significant coverage and media attention. Anzeri was one of Saatchi's 50 new artists touted as the "new YBAs". The exhibition was cited as an "explosion of new and vigorous forms which demonstrate the strength of contemporary art in Britain."

Anzeri was also a part of The Photographic Object, the inaugural exhibition of the new Photographers Gallery in London in 2009. The exhibition also included artists Walead Beshty, Vanessa Billy, Annette Kelm, Gerhard Richter, Alina Szapocznikow, Wolfgang Tilmans, Andy Warhol and Catherine Yass. Like Anzeri, they all worked closely with the medium of photography. The Photographers Gallery brought together the nine artists who "represent the physical and tactile quality of the photograph often lost in today’s digital internet world, ranging from the established (Andy Warhol) to the emerging (Maurizio Anzeri)." A review of the exhibition described Anzeri's work as “a series of images (that) are punctured and altered with colourful and patterned string. The black and white figures lose their identity in the portraits as the web of thread masks their face leaving only the orifices untouched.”

=== 2010 ===
In 2010, Anzeri won the Vauxhall Collective Prize for Fine Art. His solo exhibition for the prize, The Garden Party, included "ghostly" sculptures made from long ropes of synthetic human hair. It was held at Q Forum in central London.

Anzeri's other solo exhibitions in 2010 were:

- Lunatico at the Rupert Pfab Gallery in Düsseldorf, Germany;
- Darwin’s Tears at the Luce Gallery in Turin, Italy;
- Family Day at the Galleria Image Furini in Arezzo, Italy.

He was also a part of the following group exhibitions:

- Limited/Unlimited at La Pelanda Macro in Rome, Italy;
- Faces at the Monica DeCardenas Gallery in Milan, Italy;
- Newspeak: British Art Now at the Saatchi Gallery in London.

=== 2011 ===
Anzeri held his first solo show in a major UK institution, Family Day, at the Baltic Centre for Contemporary Art. The Baltic Gallery press release read:

Using individual and group portraits of unknown people of the 1930s and 1940s found in flea markets, Anzeri overlays meticulously patterned coloured threads by stitching and sewing directly on to the photographic surface. Obscuring part of the photograph, he both hides and heightens features of the face. These intricate additions create something almost three-dimensional, transforming flat images in to objects with a charged psychological presence. Anzeri draws upon a wide range of influences including contemporary fashion, voodoo ceremonies and surrealist imagery. Precise juxtapositions in his work recall the collage of the Surrealists and the photomontages of German Dadaists Hannah Hoch and Raoul Hausmann.

He was also a part of the group shows Makeup at the Galleria A Palazzo in Brescia, Italy, and Version and Diversions at the Temple Bar Gallery in Dublin, Ireland.

This was also the first year Anzeri exhibited his work in the US, with the exhibitions Intersection at the Marlborough Gallery in New York and Alexander McQueen's Savage Beauty exhibition, held after McQueen's death at the Metropolitan Museum of Art, New York. Anzeri created Lady Ugolino, a sculptured coat made out of hair, for McQueen's Eshu collection in 2000, which was featured in the exhibition. Lady Ugolino was also later shown at the Savage Beauty exhibition in London's V&A Museum in 2015 and is now part of the V&A Museum's permanent collection.

=== 2012 ===
In 2012, Anzeri was a part of the group exhibitions Capogiro (at the Museo Di Stato Della Repubblica in San Marino) and MIART (in Milan, Italy).

=== 2013 ===
In 2013, Anzeri had another major solo exhibition at the Chapter Arts Centre in Cardiff, But it's Not Late, It's Only Dark. The Guardian Newspaper’s Art Critic, Sean O’ Hagan said:

Anzeri has said that his embroidered images suggest "other possible evolutionary dimensions for the people pictured", but his work has a surrealist rather than a Darwinian undertow. Sombre-looking children and sophisticated adults take on an absurdist aspect. The people pictured all but disappear in the process, becoming shadows or outlines beneath the lines. What was once a portrait is something else entirely: a formal, sculptural, diagrammatic artwork in which identity and expression is camouflaged. Anzeri creates something new and surprising by applying an old-fashioned craft to old-fashioned artefacts.

He also took part in the group exhibition UK Photography Now at the Dong Gang Museum in South Korea.

=== 2014–2015 ===
Anzeri was commissioned to do a portrait by the Bavarian State Opera in Munich alongside other artists including Elizabeth Peyton, Vik Muniz and Stephan Balkenhol. Anzeri's portrait was a tribute to the soprano Astrid Varnay that formed part of an exhibition at the Bavarian State Opera in 2014. Anzeri's work with found photographs inspired the Secondhand exhibition by Pier 24 in San Francisco in which he had a solo exhibition room. Pier 24 director, Christopher McCall wrote:

I encountered the intricately embroidered images of London based artist Maurizio Anzeri, who takes great pride in scouring flea markets and online stores for historic studio portraits. I wondered what historical precedent if any, existed for his unconventional approach. [...] over the next several months I collected over 50 unique postcards to include alongside Anzeri’s surreal portraits; it is clear that these objects, once perceived commonplace, not only are part of the medium’s history but also need to be acknowledged and preserved.

Anzeri took part in the exhibition The Needles Eye at the Kode Museum in Bergen, Norway in 2014 and in the Oslo National Museum in 2015. The exhibition was the reflection of a new interest in material-based art and hand-crafting techniques that had emerged in contemporary art and had gained new relevance in Northern Europe.

In 2015, VaPensiero, Anzeri's mobile sculpture made of 39 found photographs, embroidery and steel, was exhibited at Miart - The International Fair of Contemporary and Modern Art for the FANTOM photo foundation in Milan, Italy. He did a series of embroidered landscapes for The Mapmaker's Dream at the Haines Gallery in San Francisco, USA.

=== 2016 ===
In Anzeri's exhibition Many for the Haines Gallery in 2016 at Volta New York, his embroidered portraits were described as follows:

What was once a portrait is something else entirely; a formal, sculptural, diagrammatic artwork in which identity and expression are both camouflaged and revealed, engaging viewers in a sustained conversation and his embroidered landscapes the angled coloured threads suggest the tracing of recurring, unseen phenomena such as magnetic fields or paranormal activity. Yet Anzeri's interventions in to natural scenes...can just as easily promote an underlying sense of harmony.

But my love does not die: works from the Alloggia collection in Rome was exhibited at the Ivan Bruschi Museum in Arezzo, Italy in June 2016. The Alloggia collection includes the works Family (2008) and Military (2008) by Anzeri, both embroidery on found photographs from the Family Album series. In A Take on Vintage Photography at the Photography Museum in Vilnius, Lithuania, Anzeri exhibited alongside thirteen Lithuanian and foreign artists of different generations, who use vintage photographs "for creation of new meanings." Anzeri was also a part of the group-show Allure, which opened in May at the C/O in Berlin, Germany and exhibited at PhotoLondon for The Photographer’s Gallery.

Also in 2016, Anzeri was commissioned to create large scale art works and sculpture at Milan’s Royal Palace for an exhibition called The King and I. Alongside artists Maurizio Anzeri, Arthur Arbesser, Paola Besana, Gentucca Bini, Matthew Herbert, Taisuke Koyama, Francesco Simeti, Adrian Wong and Shane Aspegren, he was "called to write a collective story in which the fairy-tale imagination establishes a dialogue with the architecture and decorations of the apartment, including sculptures, photographs, clothes, installations and performances."

=== 2017 ===
In 2017 Anzeri was in London with Iconoclasts: Art Outside of the Mainstream at the Saatchi Gallery. Amongst mixed reviews for the exhibition as a whole, Anzeri received plaudits for his works:

- "Among the 13 ‘iconoclasts’ on show was Maurizio Anzeri, known for photographic portraits that he embellishes with embroidery. Often the embroidery functions as an elaborate mask and, in the case of Yvonne, the effect is almost Cubist, recalling the multifaceted portraits of Picasso. Inspired by his Italian fishing heritage, the embroidery adds a third dimension to his photographs, offering an arresting juxtaposition of textures and colours."
- "[...] and within this myriad of ‘defiers’, you'll find the likes of French artist Thomas Mailaender, whose artworks dabble in replacing found images onto human flesh [...] Alongside this, you will also find the intricate stitchings of Italian-British artist Maurizio Anzeri; the two traditional arts of fishing net repair and the 2D image being delicately spliced together despite the unlikely partnership."

Lay it on the line was Anzeri's solo exhibition of embroidered landscapes at the Haines Gallery in San Francisco.

=== 2018 ===
Anzeri's 2018 exhibitions included:

- Planetarium at the Galleria Vittorio Emanuele in Milan;
- Acrobat Wolf (La Loup Acrobate) at Virgile Lagrand in Paris, where he launched a book with Arthur H. Editions;
- In-Equilibrio, his solo exhibition at the Haines Gallery in San Francisco.

Anzeri collaborated with the magazine Self Service for its 25th anniversary edition to create artworks using embroidery and collage on photographs of Bjork, Kate Moss, Tilda Swinton and Charlotte Rampling. These works were part of the exhibition Self Service: 25 Years of Fashion, People and Ideas Reconsidered at Dallas Contemporary.

=== 2019 ===
In 2019, Anzeri was part of the group photography exhibition Looking Back: Ten Years of Pier 24 Photography at Pier 24 Photography in San Francisco, USA alongside Robert Adams, Diane Arbus, Richard Avedon, Dorothea Lange, and Hiroshi Sugimoto.

He also had solo exhibitions Likenesses at the Haines Gallery in San Francisco, USA and Te – Che at the Convento di Santa Caterina in Borgo, Italy.

The art video Mono No Aware that Anzeri made with the Italian music collective, "C'mon Tigre", was screened at the Il Cinema Ritrovato Film Festival in Bologna, Italy. The film was nominated for the Los Angeles Film Awards for Best Music Video in 2019.

=== 2021 ===
In November 2021, Anzeri was in a group exhibition Known and Strange at the Victoria and Albert Museum in London featuring the artwork Lucy (2018).

=== 2022 ===
Anzeri's April 2022 solo exhibition On the Move was held at the public art gallery The Box in Plymouth, England. It highlighted his new body of work of life size puppets made from plasters and brass.

Anzeri also exhibited in the group exhibition The Dress Code showing A Little Black Dress, a wearable sculpture Anzeri made for fashion editor Isabella Blow in 2000.

The April 2022 exhibition OVERDOSE, shown at the Design Museum Holon in Israel, included two of Anzeri's embroidered portraits of found photographs.

== Career ==
Anzeri has been a visiting lecturer at the Royal College of Art, the Winchester School of Art and the Cardiff School of Art and Design. He has taught on the Tate Britain and Tate Modern education programmes, the Tate Lab.

Anzeri's work is used by art teachers in the national secondary school curriculum in England. He took part in the Great Art Quest, a national UK arts project designed by The Prince's Foundation for Children & the Arts.

Anzeri collaborated with the Italian music collective C’mon Tigre on the video "Mono No Aware", directed by Marco Molinelli. It was nominated for the Los Angeles Film Award for Best Music Video in 2019. The film also screened at the Bologna Film Festival Il Cinema Retrovato.

== Awards ==
- 2010 Vauxhall Collective Prize for Fine Art

== Features in publications ==
Anzeri's works and exhibitions have featured in several print and online publications, including:

- Scenes of the Real and Cathedrals of the Mind, 2006
- L'Angelo Sigillato (The Sealed Angel) 2008
- Family Day, 2009
- Photography Now, 2010
- Fantom- Photographic Quarterly, 2010
- Crafts Magazine, 2010
- Vogue Italia no. 722, 2010
- Newspeak- British Art Now, 2010
- NY Arts Magazine Volume 17 2011
- Another Man, 2011
- Elephant Issue 9, 2011
- The Embroidered Secrets of Maurizio Anzeri, 2011
- Dazed and Confused Issue. 98, 2011
- Experimenta, 2011
- Contour Magazine, 2011
- New York Times Magazine, 2011
- Kunst, 2011
- Design Boom, "Maurizio Anzeri's Embroidered Photographs", 2011
- Dazed and Confused, November 2012
- Surface Design Journal, 2012
- Vogue, 2012
- Lokalirri, 2012
- The Guardian Newspaper, 2013
- The Drawbridge issue 18 - Ghosts, 2013
- Juxtapoz Magazine, 2013
- Contemporary Art Magazine Review, 2013
- The Guardian Newspaper, 2014
- Secondhand, 2014
- Alta Data, 2014
- EYEBOOK, 2015
- El Pais, 2015
- Conversations, 2015
- Phoebe Augier e mag, 2015
- Volta NY, 2016
- Iconoclasts: Art Out of the Mainstream, 2017
- Silas Marner, 2018
- Wall Street International Magazine, 2018
- MoonMan, 2019
- Looking Back: Ten Years of Pier 24 Photography, 2019
- Self Service Issue 50, 2019
- La Repubblica, 2019
- Das Alphabet der Puppen, Camilla Grudova

== Works in public and private collections ==
The Victoria and Albert Museum, London, has five of Anzeri's works in their permanent collection. The museum also holds Lady Ugolino (2000).

The Saatchi Collection, London, has 18 of Anzeri's works.

The following galleries and collections also hold Anzeri's works:

- Fondazione Agnelli in Torino, Italy
- Shanghai Gallery of Art
- Gagosian Collection
- Rothschild Collection
- Ivor Braka Collection, London
- Statoil Collection, Oslo
- Missoni Collection, Milan
- The Museum Of Everything, London
- Museo Cantonale, Lugano, Switzerland
- Museum Kunstpalast, Düsseldorf
- Pier24 Photography, San Francisco

== See also ==
- Melissa Zexter, another artist working in the medium of embroidered photography
