= Todd Hunter (disambiguation) =

Todd Hunter (born 1951) is a New Zealand musician and composer.

Todd Hunter may also refer to:

- Todd Hunter (bishop) (born 1956), American Anglican bishop and author
- Todd Ames Hunter (born 1953), American politician
- Todd B. Hunter, official in the U.S. Department of Veterans Affairs

== See also ==
- Todhunter, the surname of several notable individuals
