= Collegiate School (New York City) =

Boys school in Manhattan, New York

Coordinates: 40°47′00″N 73°58′52″W

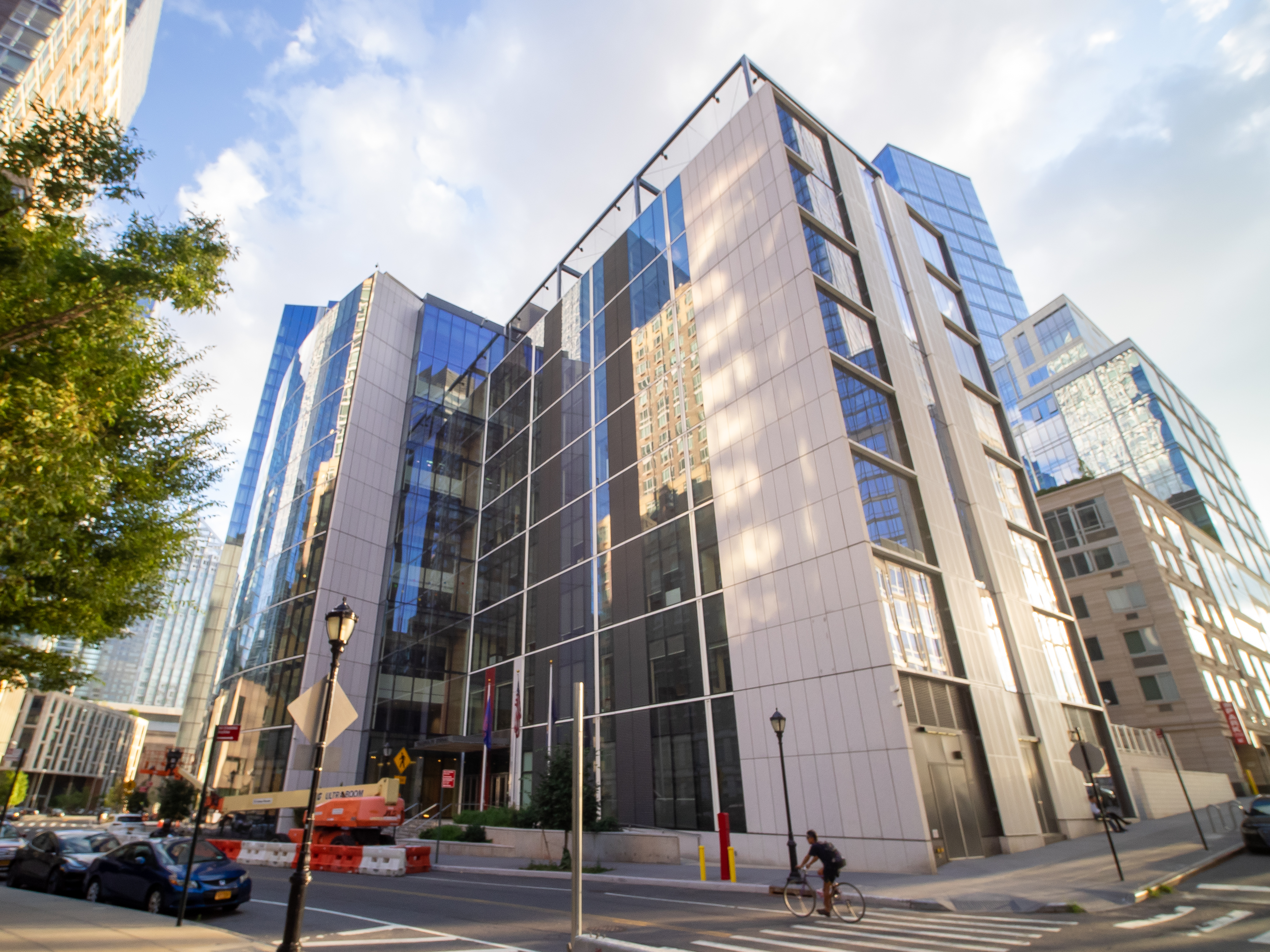
- Current campus at 301 Freedom Place

Location
- 301 Freedom Place South; New York, New York 10069; United States

Information
- Type: Private, day, college prep
- Motto: Dutch: Eendracht maakt macht ("In unity there is strength"); Latin: Nisi Dominus Frustra ("Without God, it is in Vain")
- Established: 1628; 398 years ago
- Founder: The Rev. Jonas Michaelius and the Dutch West India Company
- Chairman: Jonathan Youngwood ’85
- Headmaster: Bodie Brizendine
- Faculty: 128.6 (on an FTE basis)
- Grades: K–12
- Gender: Boys
- Enrollment: 666 (2024–25)
- Student to teacher ratio: 5.1:1
- Campus: Urban
- Colors: Orange, Blue, and White
- Nickname: Dutchmen
- Newspaper: The Journal
- Yearbook: The Dutchman
- Affiliations: Ivy Prep School League; New York Interschool
- Website: collegiateschool.org

Collegiate School is an all-boys private school on the Upper West Side of Manhattan, New York City. Founded by Dutch colonists in either 1628 or 1638, it is the nation's oldest private secondary school, and claims to be the nation's oldest school without qualification. It educates around 670 boys in grades K–12, with approximately 50–55 students per grade.

It is a member of both the New York Interschool Association and the Ivy Preparatory School League, two groups of New York City secondary schools.

== History ==
=== Establishment and founding date controversy ===
In 1628, the Reverend Jonas Michaëlius, the first minister of the Dutch Reformed Church in America, arrived in the Dutch colony of New Netherland. That August, he wrote to an Amsterdam preacher that he wanted "to place [Native American] students under the instruction of some experienced and godly schoolmaster, where they may be instructed not only to speak, read, and write in our language, but also especially in the fundamentals of our Christian religion." It appears that some form of Dutch "school" existed on Manhattan no later than 1632, when a marriage contract instructed a husband to "keep [his step-children] at school."

In August 1637, the Dutch West India Company and the Classis of Amsterdam, the supervising body of the Dutch Reformed Church, licensed Adam Roelantsen to open a state-funded school in Manhattan, which opened in 1638. The school began as a co-ed school located south of Canal Street, but became an all-boys institution at the end of the 19th century.

The school has revised its founding date over the years. The school initially set the founding date at 1633, but later changed it to 1638, as archival research suggested that Roelantsen visited Manhattan in 1633, but was not teaching at that time. In 1982, the New-York Historical Society revealed a 1628 letter from Michaëlius discussing his teaching efforts. Based on this letter, the school announced in 1984 that it was changing the foundation date to 1628, allowing it to (somewhat controversially) claim the title of the oldest school in America. (Boston Latin School, the nation's oldest public school, was founded in 1635, and Harvard University, the nation's oldest university, was founded in 1636.)

Collegiate asserts continuity with Michaëlius' tutoring work because "the minister's efforts later led to the founding of Collegiate" and Dutch Reformed ministers frequently took on teaching duties in the Dutch colonies. In 2009, a Dutch historian contested Collegiate's position and supported the 1638 date, albeit in a summary footnote.

=== Dutch bastion in English New York ===
Collegiate traditionally catered to Manhattan's Dutch settler population, even after the English conquest. Under English and later British rule, in the years before free, universal public education, the various religious denominations sponsored schools for their own communities. Collegiate was funded by New York's Collegiate Reformed Protestant Dutch Church, hence the name. (The term "collegiate" refers to a network of churches that "shared ministers and kept a single set of registers.")

The school stubbornly retained its Dutch identity for over a century after the English conquest. In 1705, it fended off the English colonial governor's (Lord Cornbury) attempts to take over the school, after which Cornbury encouraged William Huddleston to establish the Anglican Trinity School in 1709. Classes were conducted exclusively in Dutch until 1773. The school educated only members of the Dutch Reformed Church until 1869, and even after 1869, Dutch Reformed children had an advantage in the admissions process.

Collegiate gained independence from the Reformed Church in 1808, but retained its association with the Church until 1940, when it became a non-profit corporation. The Church continued to be the school's landlord, but charged low rent in exchange for seats on the school's board of trustees, an arrangement that lasted until 2015.

Due to the school's long history, it has taken on several names, including Charity School of the Reformed Protestant Dutch Church and School of the Collegiate Reformed Dutch Church. The school was renamed Collegiate School of the Reformed Protestant Dutch Church in 1860 and Collegiate Grammar School in 1887. It has also moved 17 times over the last four centuries.

=== Transition to college-preparatory school ===
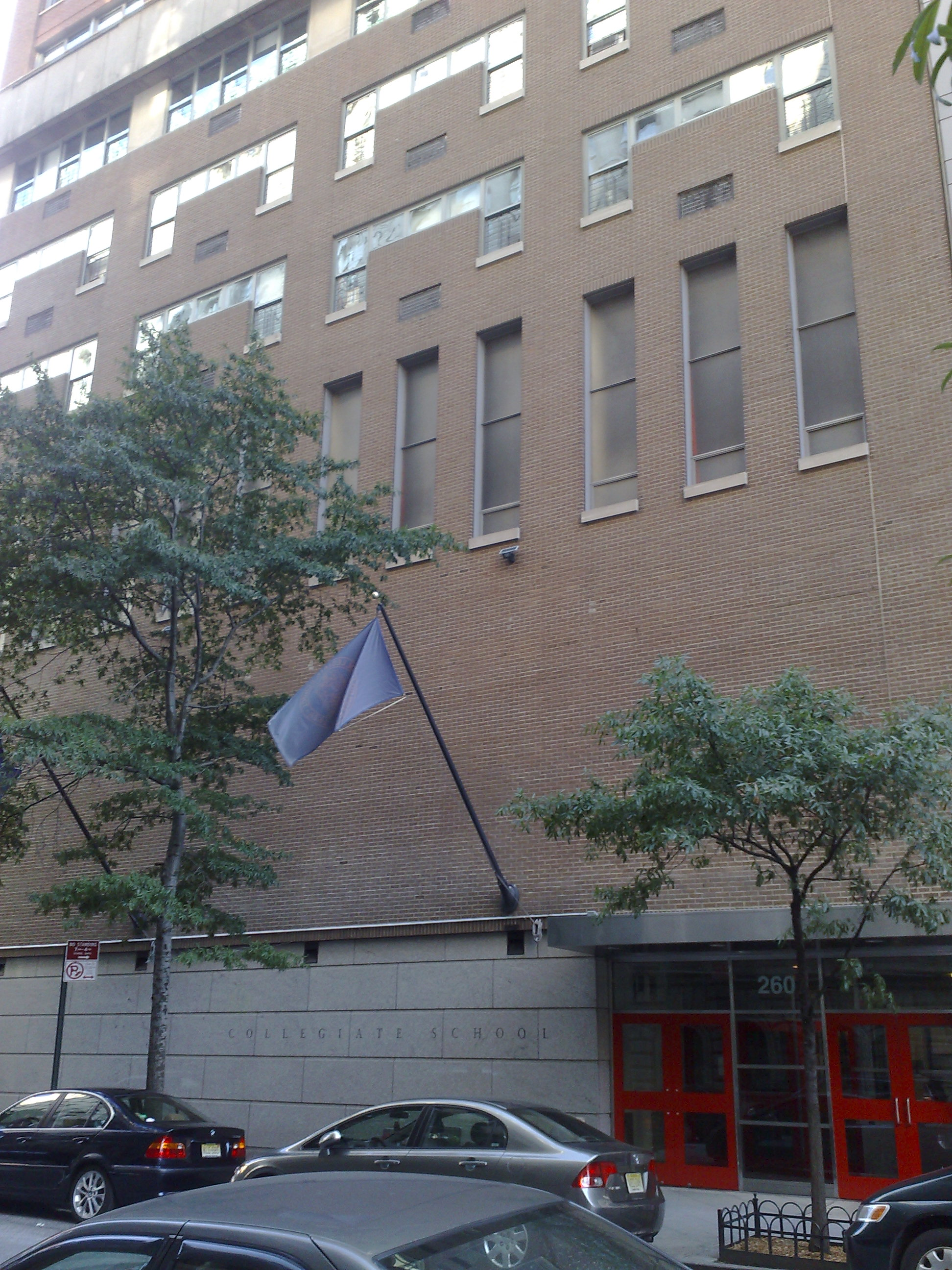
The new building of the old Collegiate School campus (1968).

LeMuel C. Mygatt served as headmaster from 1887 to 1910. Under his leadership, Collegiate – which was challenged by declining financial support from the Collegiate Church – transitioned from a co-educational, tuition-free "charity school" to the present-day all-boys college-preparatory school. In 1887 the school moved uptown from 29th Street to 74th Street and began charging tuition. Tuition for the college-preparatory division was set at $200 a year, a princely sum at a time when Phillips Exeter charged day students $45–60 a year. The school generally stopped admitting girls in 1892, but operated a co-educational kindergarten from 1935 to 1961.

Under Mygatt, the school moved to the 77th Street grounds of the West End Collegiate Church (a division of the broader Collegiate Church) in 1892, where it would remain until 2018. (A 78th Street extension was added in 1968.) The school's original building at the West End location was listed on the National Register of Historic Places.

Collegiate historically catered to an upper-class clientele – in 1972, The New York Times wrote that "from its inception, Collegiate's student body has included the children of some of the best known families in New York" – and its middle school traditionally served as a feeder school to (mostly Eastern) boarding schools with similarly affluent student bodies. However, in the 1960s, the American upper class increasingly leaned towards sending their children to day schools. From 1961 to 1970, the share of Collegiate students who left for boarding school declined from 75% to 9%.

The school also offered an extensive financial aid program. In 1971, nearly a third of Collegiate's 518 students were on scholarship.

=== 21st century ===
Collegiate has had six Heads of School (including one interim head) in the 21st century. Kerry P. Brennan, the former head of the Upper School at Ohio's University School, led the school from 2000 to 2004, succeeding Jacob Dresden. Following Brennan's departure, W. Lee Pierson served as interim head from 2004 to 2006. Lee M. Levison, the former head of Connecticut's Kingswood Oxford School, led the school from 2006 to 2020. He was succeeded by David S. Lourie, the former head of Virginia's St. Anne's-Belfield School, who served from 2020 to 2024. In 2024, Collegiate appointed Bodie Brizendine, the former head of New York's Spence School, as its Head of School; she is the first female Head of School in Collegiate's history.

On January 12, 2018, Collegiate opened a new 180,000-square foot building on 301 Freedom Place South, in New York's Riverside South neighborhood. The school conducted two capital campaigns totaling $100 million to facilitate the move; its chairman had previously estimated the full cost at $125–$135 million. The move took place at the behest of the West End Collegiate Church, the school's historic landlord, which wished to raise money by selling the land to property developers for residential condominiums. The Church set Collegiate a 2022 deadline to leave, but the school left several years early. In 2024, the school opened a 10,000-square foot annex space at 50 Riverside Boulevard.

Headmaster David Lourie stepped down in 2024 after four years, following internal disputes about the approach the school should take towards the Gaza war. The administration's official policy is that "the School should not take positions on matters that by their nature include a range of opinions" and should ordinarily refrain from "issuin[g] statements in response to each" act of prejudice in the news. A report noted that "many Jewish parents" believed that the school ought to have issued a statement condemning the October 7 Hamas-led attack on Israel. (Collegiate was not the only New York school to face such turmoil; Fieldston's head of school stepped down two months later.)

=== Student body ===
In the 2021–22 school year, Collegiate reported that of its 662 students, 326 (49.2%) were white, 119 (18.0%) were Asian, 22 (3.3%) were Hispanic, 47 (7.1%) were Black, and 148 (22.4%) were multiracial. The school was not permitted to include students in two or more categories.

The school is divided into Lower School (Kindergarten–Grade 4), Middle School (Grades 5–8), and Upper School (Grades 9–12). Each grade contains approximately 50–55 students.

== Academics and reputation ==
The school had a 5.9:1 student-teacher ratio in 2024. The faculty is highly educated: in 2018, the school stated that 16% of its teachers had a doctorate and 59% had at least a master's degree. In 2024 the school stated that 32.7% of its 113 teachers identified as people of color.

=== Rankings and college attendance ===
According to The New York Times, Collegiate is "small yet fiercely competitive," and "is renowned in private school circles for its academic rigor – its college placement list is the envy of many." Collegiate has been recognized in several lists of schools that send their students to selective universities.

- 2002: Worth magazine ranked Collegiate #3 in the nation for sending students to Harvard, Yale, or Princeton. Between 1998 and 2001, 20.0% of Collegiate graduates matriculated at one of these three schools.
- 2008: The Wall Street Journal ranked Collegiate #1 in the nation for sending students to eight selective colleges and universities.
- 2016: MainStreet ranked Collegiate #2 in the nation for sending students to the Ivy League schools. 40% of Collegiate graduates matriculated at one of these eight schools.

In 2019, Harvard's student newspaper reported that from 2011 to 2019, Collegiate was one of twelve high schools (four of which were New York City day schools) with five or more early inductees to Harvard's chapter of Phi Beta Kappa, a distinction that ordinarily implies nearly straight As with "one or two A-minuses."

== Iconography ==
Collegiate's iconography has traditionally reflected the school’s status as one of the remaining symbols of the Dutch legacy in New York City. The school's sports teams compete as the Collegiate Dutchmen and the school colors are orange and blue, based on the flag of Prince William the Silent. In June 2020, a History and Symbols Task Force issued a lengthy report recommending certain revisions to the school's iconography.

=== Seal and mottos ===
The old school logo, changed in 2022.

Collegiate's seal is an adaptation of the coat of arms of William the Silent (better known in the Netherlands, but not the Anglosphere, as William of Orange), who founded the Dutch Republic and the Reformed Church in that country and led the cause of independence and of freedom for the Reformed Church against Philip II of Spain. The school seal traditionally included two mottos: Eendracht Maakt Macht, Dutch for "In unity there is strength" (the motto of the Dutch Republic), and Nisi Dominus Frustra, Latin for "unless God, then in vain" (from Psalm 127). According to one scholar, the two mottos "served as rallying cries in the long-continued struggle for civil and religious liberty waged by the Netherlands against the power of Spain."

In 2022, following the Task Force's recommendation, the school changed its seal and Latin motto to remove religious references. The new Latin motto is Communitas, Sapientia, Humanitas (translated by the school as "Community, Wisdom, Humaneness"). The school also removed the abbreviation "A.D." ("in the year of our Lord") from the school seal.

=== Mascot ===
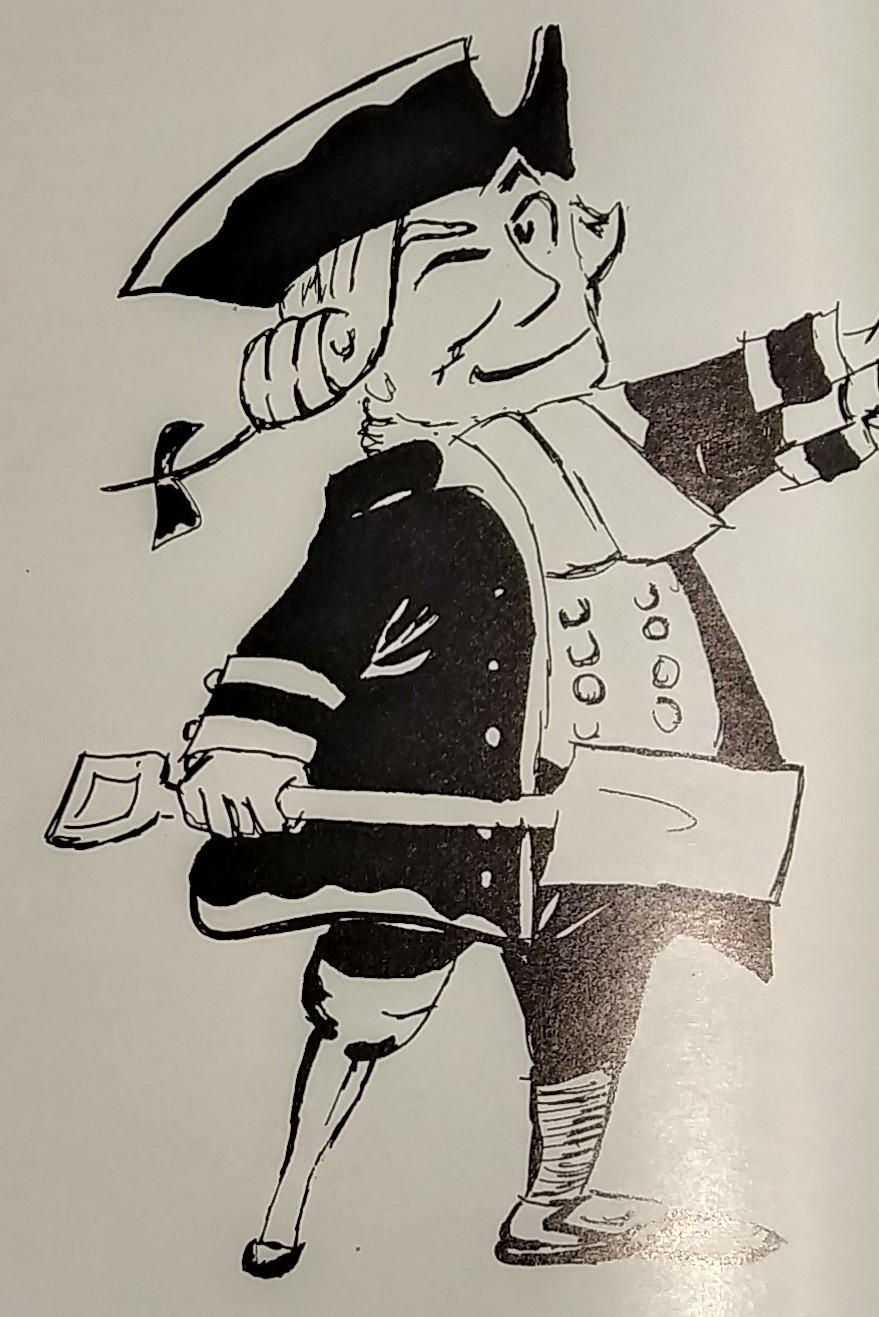
The old school mascot, "Peg Leg Pete," in the 1975 yearbook

Traditionally, the school's mascot was a Dutchman, although depictions of said Dutchman varied. Pogo cartoonist Walt Kelly, a Collegiate parent, drew the generally-used version of the mascot in the 1960s. Kelly's version was generally interpreted as a caricature of Peter Stuyvesant, and often called "Peg Leg Pete" by students. In the 21st century, the mascot's association with Stuyvesant became a subject of controversy because of Stuyvesant's lack of religious tolerance, his vision for New Amsterdam as a slave depot, and his anti-Semitism.

Following the Task Force's recommendation, the school revised the "Dutchman" mascot to remove overt references to Stuyvesant by obscuring the mascot's face and removing the peg leg.

== Finances ==
=== Tuition and financial aid ===
Tuition for the 2024–25 academic year is $65,900. The school offers a financial aid program. Although it generally does not disclose the number of scholarship students, it disclosed in 2024 that "nearly 17%" of students were on financial aid. Based on the school's $5.6 million financial aid budget in 2024, the average scholarship award is approximately $49,000.

=== Endowment and expenses ===
In 2024, Collegiate disclosed that its endowment stood at $75 million; it was $73.3 million in 2020. In its Internal Revenue Service filings for the 2022–23 school year, Collegiate reported total assets of $350.8 million, net assets of $281.8 million, investment holdings of $73.8 million, and cash holdings of $31.8 million. Collegiate also reported $42.3 million in program service expenses and $5.2 million in grants (primarily student financial aid).

== Campus ==
In January 2018, Collegiate moved into a new facility at 301 Freedom Place South. It consists of an 11-story building (nine stories above ground and two below), with 180,000 square feet (17,000 m^{2}) of classroom, athletics, theater, music, art, library, dining, and administrative space. The school has common areas dedicated to each division that provide space for independent study, social interactions, and divisional activities.

The Lower School is located on floors 2 and 3. The Middle School occupies floors 8 and 9. It has its own Maker Space, along with flexible classrooms, a Middle School Center and large, modern group study spaces. The Upper School is housed on floors 5 and 6. It is larger than the division's previous space and is next to the library. It has flexible classrooms and common areas that promote interaction among students and faculty.

Sciences for all three divisions are on floor 7. Visual arts and music occupy floor 4, with music practice spaces, art studios, and a digital photo lab. On the Lower Level is a 307-seat auditorium and a black-box theater for Collegiate's drama program. Collegiate's athletics are in the Lower Level and include a high school regulation-size gym for the basketball teams. The gym can be partitioned to provide PE classes and practice space simultaneously. An additional gym, the Alumni Gym, can accommodate wrestling competitions and half-court basketball and has a retractable batting cage.

Outdoor space consists of a large roof deck on floor 9 with a large recreation area and a ground-level, 5,000-square-foot courtyard for handball and basketball.

In late 2023, the school bought a one-story sports center at 50 Riverside, which includes a rock-climbing wall, a gym, and several golf simulators.

== Sports and co-curricular activities ==
The school's athletic success has mainly been with the varsity basketball, baseball, track and field, soccer, and cross country teams. The Collegiate soccer team won the NYSAIS state championship in 2010, 2011, and 2012. The Collegiate varsity basketball team won five straight state championships in 2008, 2009, 2010, 2011 and 2012, most recently winning in 2025 for the first time since 2016. The Collegiate cross country team won 25 Ivy League Championships in a row from 1990 to 2014. The Collegiate wrestling team won their first Ivy League and NYSAIS titles in 2022. Collegiate also has a golf and tennis team. Students not participating in a sport take physical education. Yearly fitness tests are administered in the lower and middle schools.

The school has a number of clubs, especially in the Upper School, including The Collegiate Journal. its newspaper operating since 1932; The Dutchman, the yearbook published every year since 1906; and Prufrock. its literary magazine, first published in 1973.

== Affiliated organizations ==
- Ivy Preparatory School League
- National Association of Independent Schools
- New York State Association of Independent Schools
- Interschool
