= Horace Mann School =

Private school in Bronx, New York, US

Location
- 231 West 246th Street; The Bronx, New York 10471; United States; 40°53′36″N 73°53′52″W

Information
- Type: Private school
- Motto: Latin: Magna est veritas et prævalet (Great is the truth and it prevails)
- Established: 1887; 139 years ago
- Head of school: Thomas M. Kelly
- Teaching staff: 210.0 (FTE) (2015–16)
- Grades: PK–12
- Enrollment: 1,793 (2021–22)
- Student to teacher ratio: 8.1 (2015–16)
- Campus type: Urban
- Colors: Maroon; White
- Athletics conference: Ivy Preparatory School League; NYSAISAA
- Mascot: The Lion
- Nickname: Lions
- Newspaper: The Record
- Yearbook: The Mannikin
- Affiliations: New York Interschool
- Website: www.horacemann.org

Horace Mann School (also known as Horace Mann or HM) is an American private, independent college-preparatory school in the Bronx, founded in 1887. Horace Mann is a member of the Ivy Preparatory School League, educating students from the New York metropolitan area from nursery school to the twelfth grade. The Upper, Middle, and Lower Divisions are located in Riverdale, a neighborhood of the Bronx, while the Nursery School is located in Manhattan. The John Dorr Nature Laboratory, a 275-acre (111 ha) campus in Washington Depot, Connecticut, serves as the school's outdoor and community education center. Certain grades go during the year to learn outdoor and away-from-home skills.

== History ==
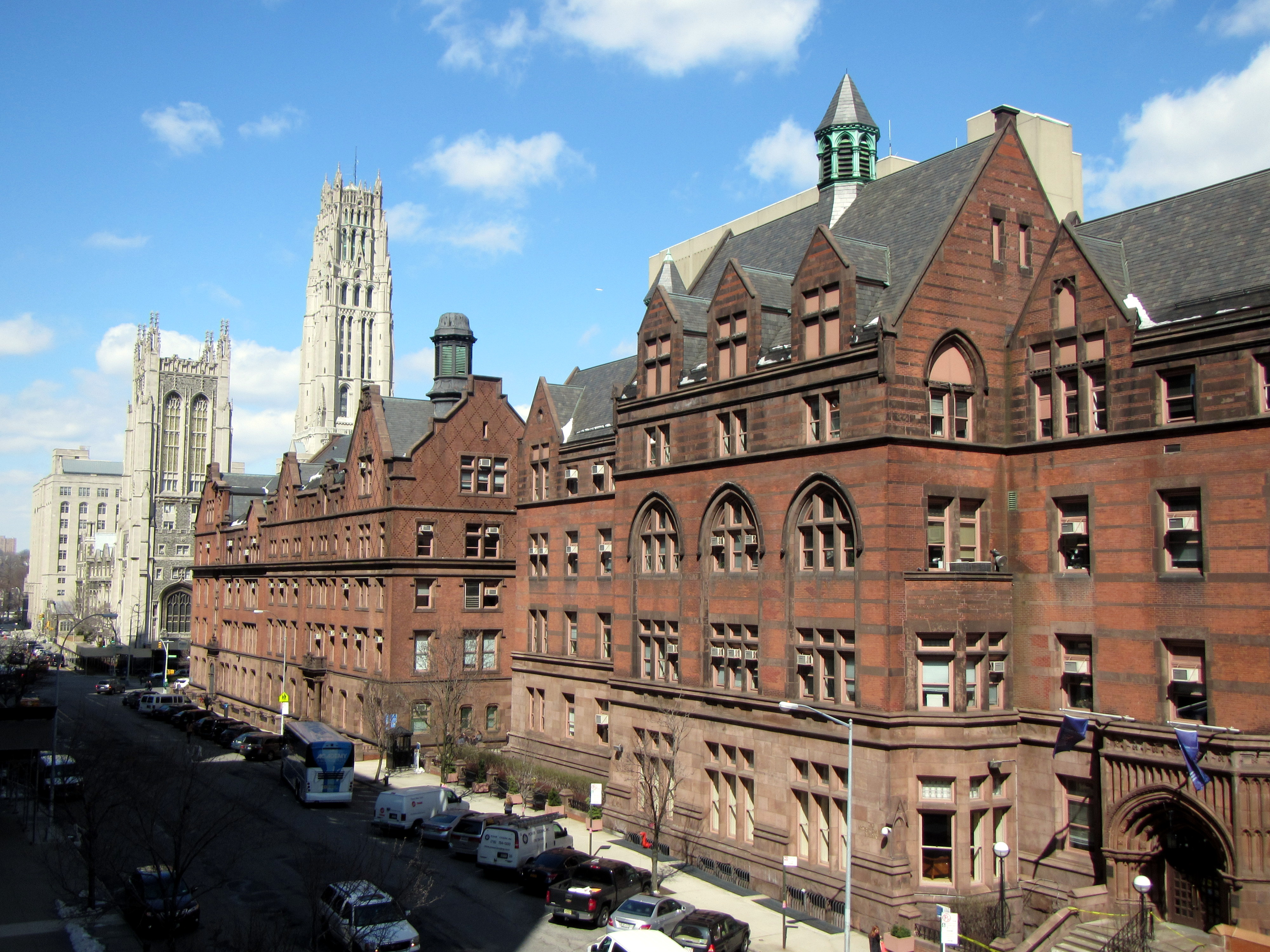
Teachers College, Columbia University

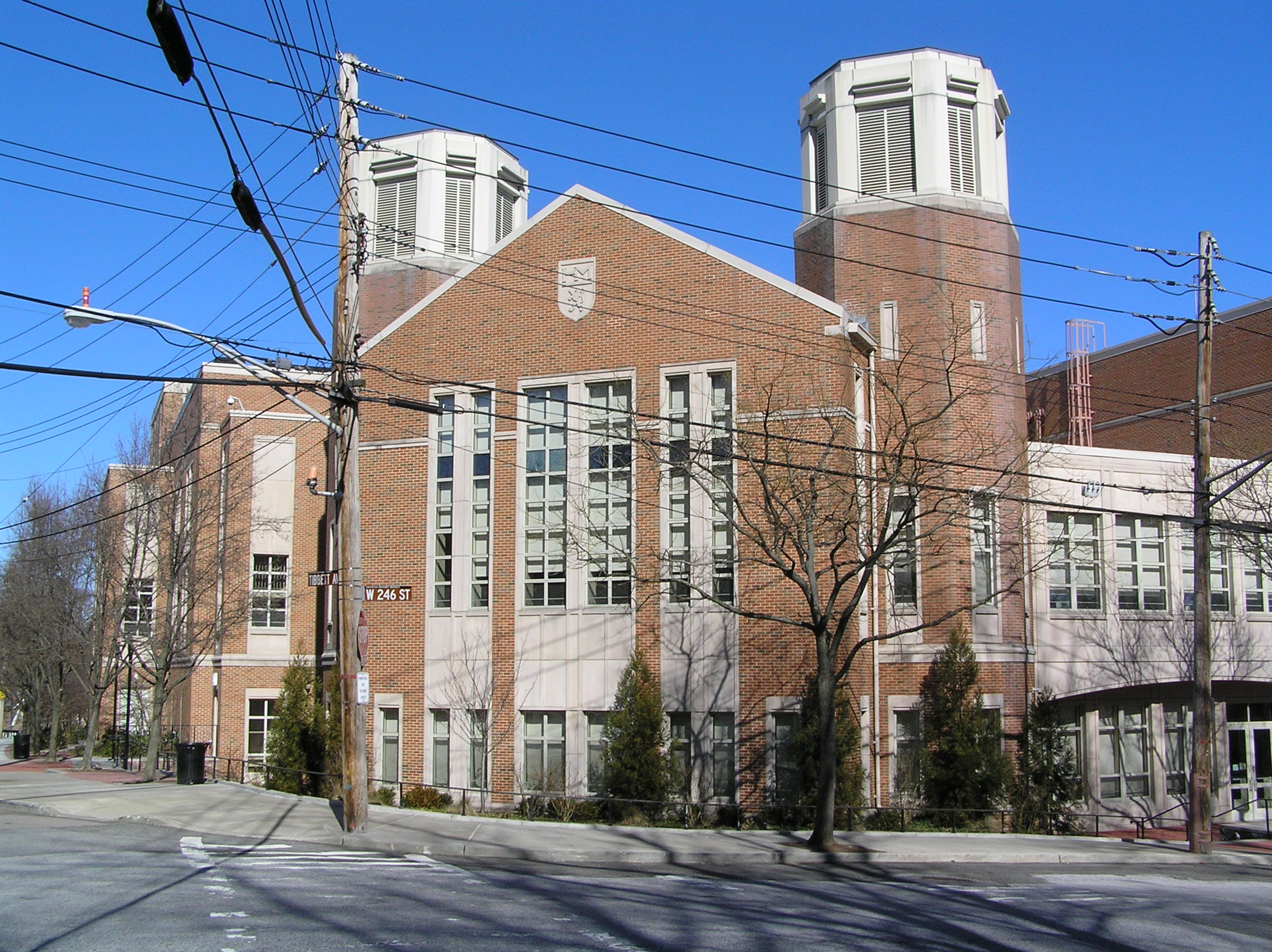
Olshan Lobby, Main entrance

=== 19th century ===
The Horace Mann School was founded in 1887 by Nicholas Murray Butler as a co-educational experimental and developmental unit of Teachers College at Columbia University. The school was named after Horace Mann, a lawyer who served in the Massachusetts State Legislature, the first secretary of the Massachusetts Board of Education from 1837 and 1848, a member of the U.S. House of Representatives, and the first president of Antioch College. He used each of his positions to proclaim that every person, regardless of their background, should receive a public education based on the principles and practices of a free society. Mann played a leading role in establishing the U.S. elementary school system. The school's first location was 9 University Place in Manhattan's Greenwich Village.

=== 20th century ===
Horace Mann moved in 1901 to 120th Street in Morningside Heights. The school split into separate all-male and all-female schools and in 1914, the Boys' School moved to 246th Street in Riverdale, Bronx, and during the 1940s it severed formal ties with Columbia University and became Horace Mann School. The Horace Mann School for Girls remained at Teachers College, and then merged with the Lincoln School in 1940, and finally closed in 1946.

The New York School for Nursery Years (founded in 1954 on 90th Street in Manhattan) became the Horace Mann School for Nursery Years in 1968 and was co-ed. In 1972, Horace Mann merged with the Barnard School for Boys, next door in Riverdale, to form the Horace Mann-Barnard Lower School for kindergarten through grade six, located on the former Barnard School campus. At that point, only the lower school was mixed. In 1975, the Horace Mann School returned to its roots as a co-educational learning environment and began admitting girls to the Upper School. The Class of 1976 is Horace Mann School's last all-male class. In 1999, the sixth grade moved from the Horace Mann-Barnard campus to the main 246th Street campus and formed a distinct Middle Division along with the seventh and eighth grades.

== Institution ==
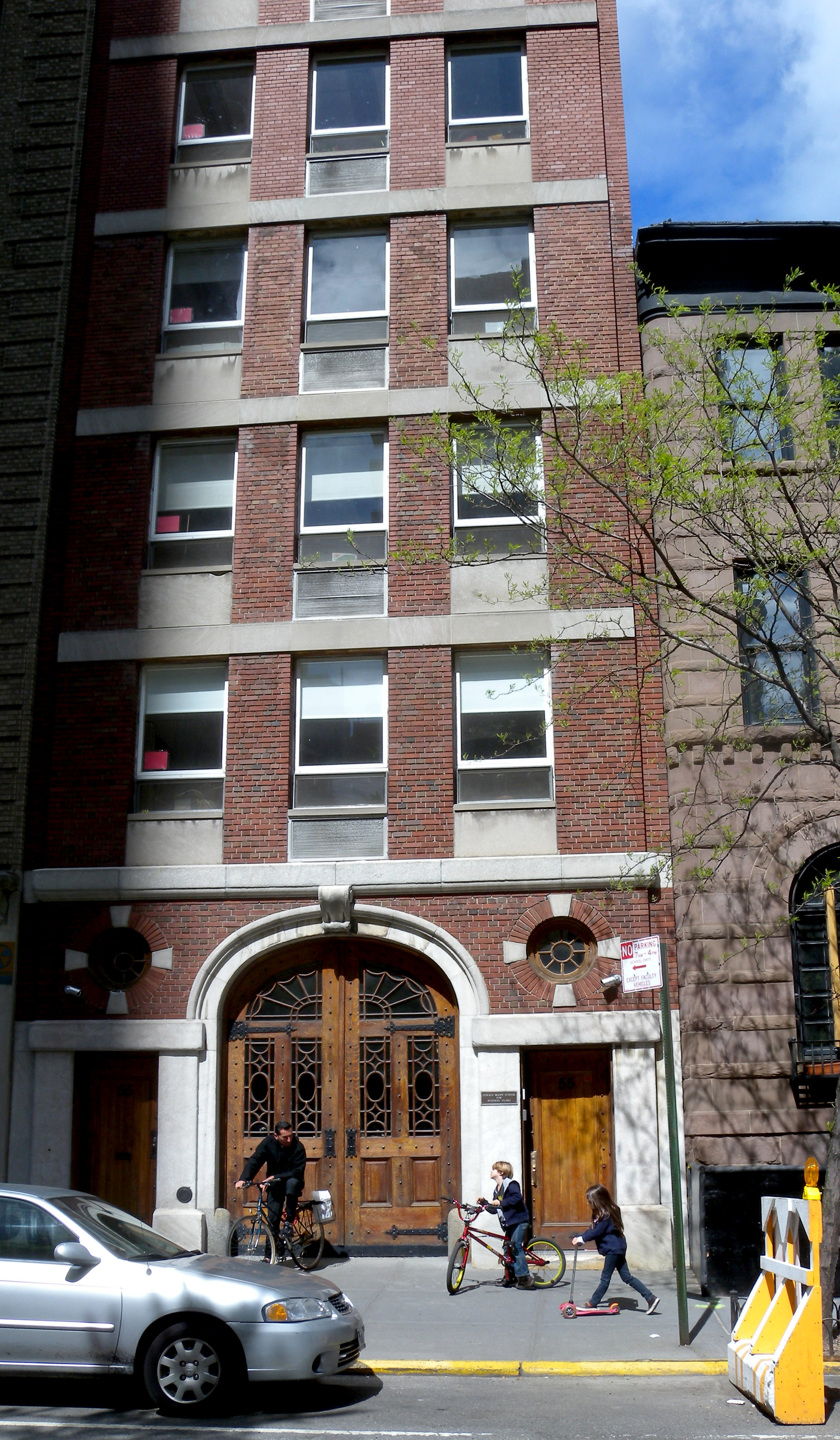
Horace Mann Nursery school

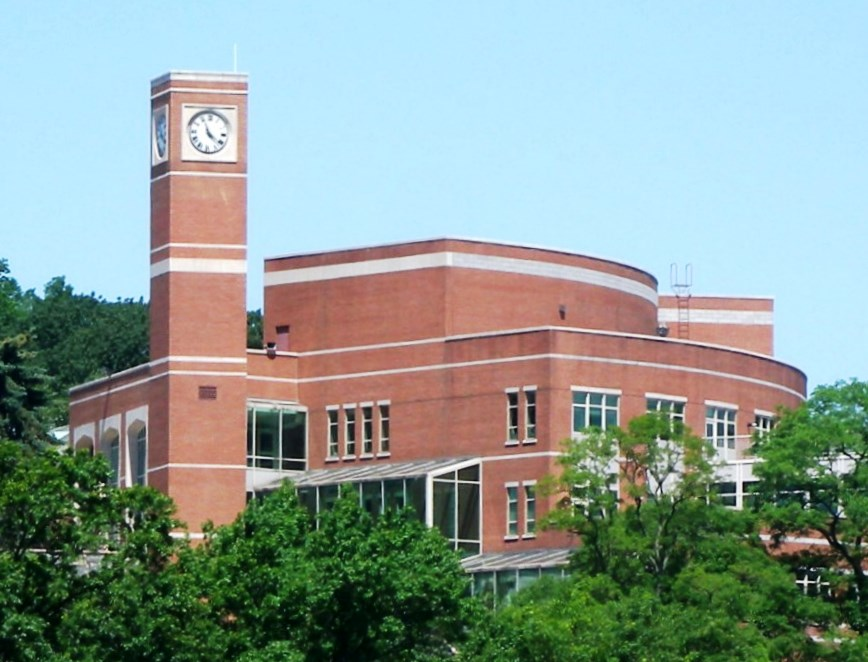
Fisher Hall, a building containing the school's main cafeteria and departments of visual arts and music.

The school is a private "nonprofit organization under the Education Law of New York State and holds a charter from the New York State Board of Regents [and is] a 501(c) 3 [tax-exempt] organization authorized by the Internal Revenue Service".

=== Divisions ===
There are four divisions of Horace Mann, all co-educational: a Nursery Division (three-year-olds through kindergarten) located on 90th Street in Manhattan, a Lower Division (kindergarten through fifth grades) on the Horace Mann campus on Tibbett Avenue in Riverdale, a Middle Division (sixth through eighth grades) on the 246th Street campus in Riverdale, and an Upper Division (ninth through twelfth grades) also on the 246th Street campus. There is also the John Dorr Nature Laboratory, located on 275 acres (111 ha) of land in Washington Depot, Connecticut, used for extended field trips for classes of students starting in second grade and an orientation program for new students entering the Middle or Upper Divisions. The Dorr facility was recently renovated and is currently LEED-certified by the U.S. Green Building Council.

In 2024 tuition for students in the Lower Division through the Upper Division is $61,900 a year.

=== Rankings ===
In 2017, Niche ranked HM as the best private K -12 school in the United States. Three years later, in 2020, Niche ranked HM the third-best K–12 private school in the country and the 12th-best private high school in the country. In 2024, the Niche survey ranked Horace Mann the fifth-best private high school in the country.

== Sexual abuse scandal ==
=== Initial reports ===
On June 6, 2012, The New York Times Magazine published an article by a former student who investigated instances of sexual abuse of students by teachers at the school. The incidents occurred during the 1970s, 1980s, and 1990s. The article also addressed how school administrators dealt with the incidents over time, both within the school community and, in the case of one teacher, in a post-employment reference. The victims were identified by partial name or letter. Several of the central figures had died by the time of publication, at least two by suicide—one of the accused and one of the students. One individual mentioned in the article, music teacher Johannes Somary, died in 2011. On June 23, 2012, The New York Times reported that Tek Young Lin, Horace Mann's former chaplain who also served as an English teacher and track coach, admitted that he had had sexual relations with several male students.

=== Hilltop Cares Foundation ===
As a result of the sexual abuse and resulting controversy, the Hilltop Cares Foundation was formed in the summer of 2012 by members of the Horace Mann community, including alumni, purposed to help victims from the school and to promote healing. The organization helps alumni with their therapy costs and addresses related issues in the broader community. It is a nonprofit and independent of the school's administration and board of trustees. The Chair for Hilltop Cares said they strive to bring healing to the Horace Mann community.

=== Negotiations ===
In March 2013, the school was reportedly in negotiation with more than thirty students for compensation related to the abuse claims. Eighteen different faculty members had been accused, and events spanning the four decades prior to 2000 identified. In March 2013, The New Yorker published an article discussing sexual abuse allegations against former Horace Mann English teacher Robert Berman. In April, The New York Times reported the school had settled with about 27 of the 37 students identified as having been abused. The school formally apologized to the community on May 24 for the events that had occurred and published the actions the school has taken and protocols that were put in place to protect current and future students.

== See also ==
- Education in New York City
- List of high schools in New York City
