= The Town School =

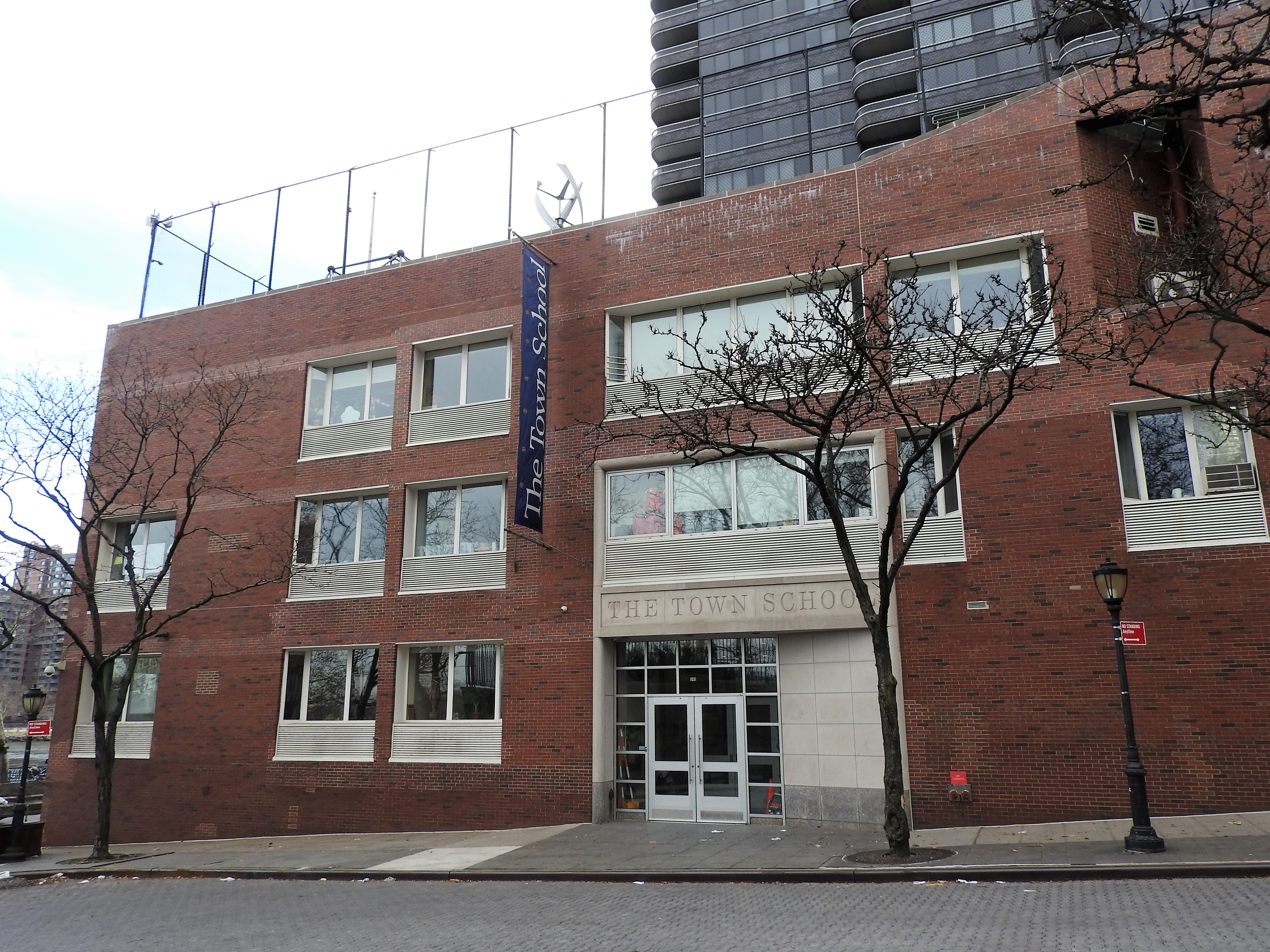

Location
- 540 East 76th Street; New York City, New York; United States; 40.768267°N 73.94979°W

Information
- Type: Independent, Coeducational
- Motto: Gaudeant Discentes “Let there be joy in learning”
- Established: 1913
- Founder: Hazel Hyde
- Oversight: Board of Trustees
- Headmaster: Douglas Brophy
- Faculty: approx. 68
- Grades: N–8
- Enrollment: 400
- Campus: Urban
- Colors: Blue and White
- Mascot: Timberwolves
- Accreditation: New York State Association of Independent Schools (NYSAIS)
- Affiliation: National Association of Independent Schools (NAIS); New York State Association of Independent Schools (NYSAIS); New York Interschool (Associated); Green School Alliance
- Endowment: $40 million
- Website: Official website

The Town School is an independent, nonsectarian, coeducational elementary school located at 540 East 76th Street on the Upper East Side of Manhattan in New York City.

Founded in 1913, the school currently has approximately 400 students enrolled from Nursery 3 through eighth grade.

== Specifics ==
Since 1963, the school has been located on a cul-de-sac at the end of East 76th Street (at the FDR Drive), overlooking the East River and John Jay Park (on the same block as the Lycée français de New York). Today the school is housed in three connected buildings. Facilities include a library, technology center, science labs, a full-size indoor gymnasium, two large play terraces, a large auditorium, solar panels, wind turbine, and Innovation Lab.

The student-to-teacher ratio is approximately 6:1 overall with class size ranging from 18–22 and with two teachers in early grades.

The Town School comprises three divisions:

- Nursery/Kindergarten – Pre-school for three- and four-year-olds and Kindergarten
- Lower School – Grades 1 – 4
- Upper School – Grades 5 – 8

Tuition at The Town School for the 2022 – 2023 school year ranges, based on age, from $35,950 per year for the Nursery 3 class to $55,700 per year for the Upper School.

== History ==
The Town School was founded in 1913 by Hazel Hyde as Miss Hyde’s School, a nursery school on East 81st Street. After a dozen years, the school moved to 114 East 76th Street, where it remained for nearly four decades. Following the resignation of Hazel Hyde in 1936, the school was renamed The Town School under the leadership of Harriette Young, Margaret Crane and Lois Wright.

In 1945, following the end of World War II, The Town School purchased its location on East 76th Street and later acquired two adjoining brownstones in 1950 and 1959.

In 1963, The Town School moved into the former East Side Settlement House at 540 East 76th Street, the location where the school remains today, and construction soon began on a new building to supplement the earlier structure. In 1978, Town acquired an adjoining two-story factory building and continued to increase the school's space through the mid-1980s. Building renovations have included a new library and technology center (1999), auditorium renovation (2008), solar panels installation (2009), the first wind turbine installed at a New York City school (2012), and Innovation Lab (2012).

By 2000, enrollment at Town reached more than 375 students from Nursery 3 through the Eighth grade, and as of the 2012–2013 school year enrollment stood at 400 students with 68 faculty members.

== Breakthrough program ==
The Town School hosts Breakthrough New York, a Breakthrough Collaborative affiliate location that aims to place high-potential, low-income middle school students who attend New York public schools into four-year colleges. Breakthrough New York was founded as Summerbridge at The Town School in 1999 by Sam Marks, a former Summerbridge Providence teacher and Town teacher at the time. In 2009, Breakthrough New York became an independent not-for-profit organization. However it continues to operate programming at The Town School.

== Accreditation ==
The Town School is accredited by the New York State Association of Independent Schools (NYSAIS), which is recognized by the Accreditation Commission of the National Association of Independent Schools (NAIS).
