= PowerToFly =

Diversity recruitment and retention platform

PowerToFly is a diversity recruiting and retention platform. Its founders, Milena Berry and Katharine Zaleski, were among Fast Company’s Most Creative People in Business in 2015. More than 1,000 companies have posted job listings on PowerToFly including Hearst, BuzzFeed and The Washington Post.

== Leadership ==
Katharine Zaleski was the sixth employee at The Huffington Post and Senior News Editor, former Executive Director of Digital at The Washington Post, and founding Managing Editor at NowThis News. Milena Berry is the former chief technology officer of Avaaz.org. PowerToFly was launched in August 2014. Katharine Zaleski’s essay, “I’m sorry to all the mothers I worked with” was Fortune’s most popular story of 2015 and sparked a massive debate about how women are treated at work. The story was shared widely around the world across social media as well as more traditional media outlets.

Advisors include Licy Do Canto (Managing Director for the Washington, DC Office at APCO Worldwide), Dionna Smith (Global Head of Diversity, Equity & Inclusion at Thumbtack), LaFawn Davis (Vice President of Diversity, Inclusion & Belonging at Indeed), and Vijay Ravindran (CEO at Floreo).

Angel investors include Jonah Peretti (Founder and CEO at BuzzFeed) and Shaiza Rizavi (Money Manager, Gilder Gagnon Howe & Co).

The company has about 100 employees based around the world.
