= Francis A. Todhunter =

American commercial artist and landscape painter

Francis Augustus Todhunter
- Born: 1884; San Francisco, California, U.S.
- Died: 1963 (aged 78–79); San Francisco, California, U.S.
- Education: California School of Design
- Occupation: Painter
- Spouse: Alice Serella Todhunter
- Children: 1 son

Francis A. Todhunter (1884–1963) was an American commercial artist and landscape painter.

Todhunter was born in 1884 in San Francisco, California. He graduated from the California School of Design, later known as the San Francisco Art Institute.

Todhunter began his career as a commercial artist at the San Francisco Chronicle alongside Rube Goldberg and Bud Fisher. He worked for the advertising firm McCann-Erickson until 1949.

Todhunter was also a watercolor and oil painter, and he exhibited his work at the Oakland Art Gallery in 1942. Although he used Impressionist features, he was "not a true impressionist" because of the use of lines in his paintings. Todhunter devoted his time to painting the landscapes of Marin County until his death.

Todhunter resided in Mill Valley, California with his wife, Alice Serella, and their son, Norman; they were both painters. He died in 1963 in San Francisco. His widow died in 1969. His artwork can be seen at the Fine Arts Museums of San Francisco.
