= John A. Todhunter =

American government official

- Born: October 9, 1949; Cali, Colombia

John A. Todhunter (born October 9, 1949, in Cali, Colombia) was an official in the Environmental Protection Agency. He was nominated by Ronald Reagan for the position of Assistant Administrator for Pesticides and Toxic Substances and occupied the post beginning November 13, 1981. He resigned March 25, 1983, one of a group of 20 officials forced out with EPA Administrator Anne Gorsuch over the agency's management of toxic waste cleanup under Superfund.

Prior to his appointment, Todhunter was an assistant professor of biology at The Catholic University of America, where he chaired the biochemistry program. He had previously worked for Hoffmann-La Roche after earning a Ph.D. from the University of California, Berkeley in 1976.

Todhunter's tenure and its aftermath were marked by criticism for delays in recognizing chemicals as carcinogens. He concluded that despite evidence of formaldehyde causing cancer in mice, there was no evidence of significant risk to humans, so the agency declined to regulate its use at the time.

After his departure, Todhunter was called to testify in congressional hearings over a delay in banning ethylene dibromide, then in use by the citrus industry as a pesticide to combat fruit flies. He was criticized for dismissing studies showing the chemical caused an increased risk of cancer to agricultural workers. In several meetings, in the context of an August 1981 fruit fly outbreak in California, and while being lobbied by Florida's congressional delegation on behalf of the industry, Todhunter resisted a ban, which was not approved until he left office.

He currently works for SRS International as a biopesticide consultant to the EPA.
