= Winifred Todhunter =

Founder of the Todhunter School for girls

Winifred Ada Todhunter (1877, London – September 11, 1961, Ladner, British Columbia) was an educator, translator and founder of the Todhunter School for girls in New York City.

Educated at Cheltenham Ladies' College and London Day Training College, she was awarded a Gilchrist travelling studentship by the University of London for distinction in her B.A. degree in 1904. Said to be a graduate of the University of Oxford, she translated Voltaire's historical novel about Charles XII of Sweden in 1908. After lecturing in history at Stockwell Training College, she succeeded Canon Rowe as Principal of Lincoln Training College for Mistresses in 1912.

In 1921 Todhunter purchased and renamed a private school for girls in Manhattan. The Todhunter School became known for being more than just a finishing school, providing courses in the arts and a solid preparation for college. When Eleanor Roosevelt learned in 1927 that Todhunter wished to retire to England and needed a buyer for the school, Mrs. Roosevelt proposed a partnership with Marion Dickerman, who was then the school's vice-principal, and Nancy Cook. The school eventually in 1939 became part of The Dalton School.

== Works ==
- (transl.) Voltaire's History of Charles XII, King of Sweden, London: JM Dent, New York: EP Dutton, 1908
