= Katharine Zaleski =

Co-founder and president of PowerToFly

- Occupation: Businesswoman
- Known for: Co-founder and president of PowerToFly

Katharine Zaleski is the co-founder and president of PowerToFly, the platform connecting women, non-binary and gender nonconforming people with companies that care. She co-founded PowerToFly with Milena Berry in August 2014, after the birth of her first daughter. She was named one of the most creative people in the business community in 2015 by Fast Company. Her essay, "I’m Sorry To All The Moms I Worked With" was Fortune’s most popular story of 2015 and sparked debate across social, as well as more traditional media outlets.

== Media presence ==
She is a frequent writer and commentator around how businesses can retain more women, especially in tech. Zaleski has appeared as a commentator on Fox Business, The Today Show, CBS News, CNN, Bloomberg, Business Insider and Forbes. In addition to Fortune, her writing has appeared in The Washington Post, Quartz, The Huffington Post, the front-page of the digital edition of The New York Times and Elle.

Zaleski appeared alongside Valerie Jarrett at the 2015 Women In The World Summit. She has also spoken at Internet Week New York and Lesbians Who Tech Summit

== Career ==
Zaleski worked for CNN after graduating from Dartmouth college in 2003. After college she was hired as one of the first editors of The Huffington Post in 2005, the same month the site launched. She was eventually promoted to Senior News Editor.

In November 2009, she became the Executive Producer and Head of Digital News Products at The Washington Post. She returned to the startup world as founding Managing Editor of NowThis News, a network that makes videos for millennials who get their news on Snapchat, Instagram and Facebook.
