= Ivy Preparatory School League =

High school sports conference in New York City

The Ivy Preparatory School League is a high school athletic conference of preparatory schools in New York City and its suburbs. The Ivy Preparatory School League has no affiliation with the Ivy League universities.

== Members ==
The league comprises the following schools:

- Collegiate School in Manhattan
- Dalton School in Manhattan
- Hackley School in Tarrytown, Westchester County
- Ethical Culture Fieldston School in Riverdale, Bronx
- Horace Mann School in Riverdale, Bronx
- Poly Prep in Brooklyn, New York
- Riverdale Country School in Riverdale, Bronx
- Trinity School in Manhattan

== Former members ==
- Adelphi Academy in Brooklyn
- New York Military Academy in Cornwall, Orange County
- St. Paul's School in Garden City, Nassau County, now closed
- The Stony Brook School in Brookhaven, Suffolk County

== Sports offered ==
The league offers competition in the following sports:

Fall sports

- Cross country (boys)
- Cross country (girls)
- Field hockey (girls)
- Soccer (boys)
- Soccer (girls)
- Tennis (girls)
- Volleyball (girls)
- Water Polo(coed)

Winter sports

- Basketball (boys)
- Basketball (girls)
- Indoor track (boys)
- Indoor track (girls)
- Squash
- Swimming (boys)
- Swimming (girls)
- Wrestling (coed)
- Ping pong (coed)

Spring sports

- Baseball (boys)
- Golf (boys)
- Golf (girls)
- Lacrosse (boys)
- Lacrosse (girls)
- Outdoor track (boys)
- Outdoor track (girls)
- Softball (girls)
- Tennis (boys)
- Ultimate Frisbee (boys)
- Ultimate Frisbee (girls)
- Volleyball (boys)

Not all member schools compete in all sports. Collegiate School is an all-boys school.

== Notable athlete alumni ==
High school graduation year is in parentheses.

Collegiate

- Ian McGinnis (1997), basketball, NCAA-leading rebounder at Dartmouth

Hackley

- Danya Abrams (1993), basketball, three-time All-Big East first-team at Boston College

Horace Mann

- Pedro Álvarez (2005), baseball, Pittsburgh Pirates and others
- Harrison Bader (2012), baseball, New York Yankees and others
- Bethany Donaphin (1998), basketball, New York Liberty

Poly Prep

- Joakim Noah (2004, from Lawrenceville School), basketball, Chicago Bulls and others
- Brian Flores (1999), football, Boston College, Head Coach for Miami Dolphins
- Isaiah Wilson (2017), football Tennessee Titans, Offensive Lineman

Riverdale

- Calvin Hill (1965), football, Dallas Cowboys and others
- Tim Morehouse (1996), fencing, United States Fencing Team, 2 time team olympian, team silver medalist in Beijing 2008

Trinity

- John McEnroe (1977), tennis
- Patrick McEnroe (1984), tennis
