= Lists of Catholic schools =

This links to lists of Catholic schools.

== By country ==
- Australia
  - List of Catholic schools in New South Wales
- Canada
  - List of schools of the Ottawa Catholic School Board
  - List of schools in the Toronto Catholic District School Board
- List of Catholic schools in Hong Kong
- List of Catholic schools in Ireland by religious order
  - List of Jesuit schools in Ireland
- List of Catholic schools in New Zealand
- List of Catholic universities and colleges in the Philippines

=== United States ===
By state

- List of Catholic schools in New York

By archdiocese or diocese

- List of schools in the Roman Catholic Archdiocese of Atlanta
- List of schools in the Roman Catholic Archdiocese of Baltimore
- List of schools in the Roman Catholic Diocese of Baton Rouge
- List of schools in the Roman Catholic Archdiocese of Boston
- List of schools in the Roman Catholic Diocese of Brooklyn
- List of schools of the Roman Catholic Archdiocese of Chicago
- List of schools of the Roman Catholic Diocese of Des Moines
- List of schools in the Roman Catholic Archdiocese of Detroit
- List of schools in the Roman Catholic Archdiocese of Dubuque
- List of schools in the Roman Catholic Diocese of Fall River
- List of schools of the Roman Catholic Diocese of Gallup
- List of schools in the Roman Catholic Diocese of Green Bay
- List of schools in the Roman Catholic Archdiocese of Hartford
- List of schools in the Roman Catholic Diocese of Jackson
- List of schools in the Roman Catholic Archdiocese of Los Angeles
- List of schools of the Roman Catholic Archdiocese of Louisville
- List of schools in the Roman Catholic Archdiocese of Miami
- List of schools in the Roman Catholic Archdiocese of Milwaukee
- List of schools in the Roman Catholic Archdiocese of New Orleans
- List of schools in the Roman Catholic Archdiocese of New York
  - List of closed schools in the Roman Catholic Archdiocese of New York
- List of schools in the Archdiocese of Philadelphia
- List of schools in the Roman Catholic Diocese of Providence
- List of schools in the Roman Catholic Diocese of Rockville Centre
- List of schools in the Roman Catholic Archdiocese of Washington
- List of schools in the Roman Catholic Archdiocese of San Francisco

By type

- List of independent Catholic schools in the United States

== By order ==
- List of Christian Brothers schools
- List of Jesuit educational institutions
- Lasallian educational institutions
- List of Marist Brothers schools
- List of Schools of the Sacred Heart

== By name ==
- List of schools named after Francis Xavier
