= List of New York state high school league conferences =

A list of the high school conferences in New York state:

== Conference Name: #-C ==
Conferences in the State of New York
Conference name	Years active	Schools included	Sports^{[1]}
Catholic High School Athletic Association-Brooklyn-Queens Section	1927–present	Bishop Ford Central Catholic High School; Bishop Kearney High School; Bishop Loughlin Memorial High School; Cathedral Preparatory Seminary; Catherine McAuley High School; Christ the King High School; Fontbonne Hall Academy; Holy Cross High School; The Mary Louis Academy; Archbishop Molloy High School; Monsignor McClancy Memorial High School; Nazareth Regional High School	All sports
Catholic High School Athletic Association-Nassau-Suffolk Section	1927–present	Chaminade High School; Holy Trinity High School; Kellenberg Memorial High School; Our Lady of Mercy Academy; Sacred Heart Academy; St. Anthony's High School; St. Dominic High School; St. John the Baptist High School; St. Mary's High School	All sports
Catholic High School Athletic Association-New York Section	1927–present	All Hallows High School; Blessed Sacrament-St. Gabriel High School; Cardinal Hayes High School; Cardinal Spellman High School; Fordham Preparatory School; Iona Prep; La Salle Academy; Maria Regina High School; Monsignor Farrell; Monsignor Scanlan; Moore Catholic High School; Mount Saint Michael Academy; Notre Dame Academy; Regis High School; Rice Academy High School; Sacred Heart High School (Yonkers, New York); Salesian High School (New Rochelle, New York); Archbishop Stepinac High School; St. Agnes Boys High School; St. John Villa Academy; St. Joseph by the Sea High School; St. Peter's Boys High School; St. Peter's High School for Girls; St. Raymond High School for Boys; The Ursuline School; Xavier High School	All sports

== O-R ==
^{[1]}

probably not comprehensive, but a good start
AAIS
Catholic A Central
Catholic A North
Catholic A South
Catholic Bklyn/Queens
Catholic New York
Catholic B
Catholic Nassau/Suffolk
Catholic Staten Island
Harvard Cup
 
Monsignor Martin - Class A
Monsignor Martin - Class AA
Section 1 Conference 1A
Section 1 Conference 1B
Section 1 Conference 1C
Section 1 Conference 1D
Section 1 Conference 2A
Section 1 Conference 2B
Section 1 Conference 2C
Section 1 Conference 2D
Section 1 Conference 2E
Section 1 Conference 3A
Section 1 Conference 3B
Section 1 Conference 3C
Section 1 Conference 3D
Section 1 Conference 4A
Section 1 Conference 4B
Section 1 Conference 4C
Section 1 Conference 4D
Section 2 Adirondack - East
Section 2 Adirondack - West
Section 2 Big Ten
Section 2 Central Hudson Valley
Section 2 Colonial
Section 2 Foothills
Section 2 Freelance
Section 2 Patroon
Section 2 Suburban - Blue
Section 2 Suburban - Gold
Section 2 Suburban - White
Section 2 Wasaren
Section 2 Western - Northern
Section 2 Western - Southern
Section 3 Center State I
Section 3 Center State II
Section 3 Center State III
Section 3 Center State IV
Section 3 Central Counties
Section 3 Colonial
Section 3 Freedom
Section 3 Freelance
Section 3 Frontier A
Section 3 Frontier B
Section 3 Frontier D
Section 3 Liberty
Section 3 Patriot
Section 3 Tri-Valley
Section 4 Delaware County - Delaware Mountain
Section 4 Delaware County - Upper Delaware
Section 4 Freelance
Section 4 Interscholastic - North Large
Section 4 Interscholastic - North Small
Section 4 Interscholastic - South Large
Section 4 Interscholastic - South Small
Section 4 Midstate
Section 4 NY-Penn Christian
Section 4 Southern Tier - Central
Section 4 Southern Tier - East
Section 4 Southern Tier - Metro
Section 4 Southern Tier - West
Section 4 Tri-Valley - East
Section 4 Tri-Valley - West
Section 5 Allegany County Division 1
Section 5 Allegany County Division 2
Section 5 Finger Lakes - East
Section 5 Finger Lakes - West
Section 5 Freelance
Section 5 Genesee County
Section 5 Livingston County I
Section 5 Livingston County II
Section 5 Livingston County III
Section 5 Monroe County I - East
Section 5 Monroe County I - West
Section 5 Monroe County II - East
Section 5 Monroe County II - West
Section 5 Private Parochial
Section 5 Rochester City Catholic
Section 5 Steuben County
Section 5 Wayne County
Section 6 Buffalo I
Section 6 Buffalo II
Section 6 Chautauqua-Cattaraugus Athletic Association 1 East
Section 6 Chautauqua-Cattaraugus Athletic Association 1 West
Section 6 Chautauqua-Cattaraugus Athletic Association 2 East
Section 6 Chautauqua-Cattaraugus Athletic Association 2 West
Section 6 Erie County I
Section 6 Erie County II
Section 6 Erie County III
Section 6 Erie County IV
Section 6 Freelance
Section 6 Niagara - Frontier
Section 6 Niagara - Orleans
Section 7 Champlain Valley I
Section 7 Champlain Valley II
Section 7 Freelance
Section 7 Mountain Valley
Section 8 AA-1
Section 8 AA-2
Section 8 AA-3
Section 8 ABC-1
Section 8 ABC-2
Section 8 ABC-3
Section 8 ABC-4
Section 8 BC
Section 8 Charter
Section 8 Freelance
Section 9 Freelance
Section 9 Mid Hudson I
Section 9 Mid Hudson II
Section 9 Mid Hudson III
Section 9 Mid Hudson IV
Section 9 Orange County I
Section 9 Orange County II
Section 9 Orange County III
Section 9 Orange County IV
Section 9 Orange County V
Section 9 Orange County VI
Section 10 Central
Section 10 East 
Section 10 North
Section 10 West
Section 11 AA-1
Section 11 AA-2
Section 11 AA-3
Section 11 AA-4
Section 11 AA/A-5
Section 11 A-6
Section 11 B/C-7
Section 11 C/D-8
Section 11 Freelance
PSAL Area Freelance
PSAL Area Independent Private Parochial
PSAL Area Independent Schools I
PSAL Area Independent Schools II
Ivy Prep League
PSAL Area Metro
PSAL Area Private School
PSAL Bronx A East
PSAL Bronx A West
PSAL Bronx AA
PSAL Bronx B West
PSAL Bronx B1 East
PSAL Bronx B2 East
PSAL Brooklyn A East
PSAL Brooklyn A South
PSAL Brooklyn A West
PSAL Brooklyn AA
PSAL Brooklyn B East
PSAL Brooklyn B West
PSAL Manhattan A East
PSAL Manhattan A Northwest
PSAL Manhattan A Southwest
PSAL Manhattan AA
PSAL Manhattan B-1
PSAL Manhattan B-2
PSAL Manhattan B-3
PSAL Queens A East
PSAL Queens A West
PSAL Queens AA
PSAL Queens B East
PSAL Queens B West
PSAL Staten Island A
Independent
Independent I
Independent II
Unassigned

== See also ==
- New York state high school boys basketball championships
- Catholic High School Athletic Association
