= Catholic High School Athletic Association =

Athletic league in New York State

The Catholic High School Athletic Association or CHSAA is a high school athletic association made up of Catholic high schools based in New York City, Long Island, Westchester and Buffalo. It is the largest Catholic high school athletic league in the United States. For schools with football programs the 3 downstate sections compete in the Catholic High School Football League. Their champion plays the MMAA (Buffalo) champion for the Catholic State Championship.

== History ==
The organization was formed in March 1927 with the name New York State Catholic Schools League. The Catholic schools in New York City from approximately 1908 to 1922 competed along with their grammar school counterparts in baseball and track, but no larger organization arose from the competition. The Catholic secondary schools of the city remained largely unorganized, while their counterparts in such cities as Chicago and Philadelphia had been organized into leagues for years. Finally, in 1927, the Southern Branch of the New York Catholic High Schools’ Athletic Association organized league competition with an outdoor track meet held at Fordham University on May 26, 1927. The charter members of the league were Fordham Prep, All Hallows, LaSalle Academy, Regis, St. Ann's, and Xavier High, all in Manhattan; and Brooklyn Prep, Bishop Loughlin, Brooklyn Cathedral, St. John's Prep, and St. Francis Prep; all in Brooklyn.

In 1928, the CHSAA introduced indoor track, basketball, and baseball to the program, and in 1929 added cross country and ice hockey. In 1930, swimming was added to the program. The basketball winner would compete with the three other sectional winners in the state for the right to compete in the Loyola National Catholic Basketball tournament in Chicago. A.G. Spalding & Co. contributed two silver loving cups for the baseball and football competition. The first team winning the league title in baseball or football three times would receive permanent possession of the cup.

== Members ==
The New York CHSAA is divided into four sections according to diocese: New York, Brooklyn-Queens, Nassau-Suffolk (Long Island) and Buffalo.

Catholic schools outside the CHSAA's territory compete in their local sections of the New York State Public High School Athletic Association. This includes Hudson Valley schools beyond Westchester County (although those are within the Archdiocese), as well as the state's other four dioceses (Albany, Ogdensburg, Rochester, and Syracuse).

=== New York Section ===
The New York Section consists of schools in Westchester, the Bronx, Manhattan, and Staten Island, corresponding to the Archdiocese of New York.

School	Colors	Team name	Location	Founded
All Hallows High School		Gaels	Bronx	1909
Cardinal Hayes High School		Cardinals	Bronx	1941
Cardinal Spellman High School		Pilots	Bronx	1959
Fordham Preparatory School		Rams	Bronx	1841
Iona Preparatory School		Gaels	New Rochelle	1916
Kennedy Catholic High School		Gaels	Somers	1966
La Salle Academy		Cardinals	Manhattan	1848
Maria Regina High School		Tigers	Hartsdale	1957
Monsignor Farrell High School		Lions	Staten Island	1961
Monsignor Scanlan High School		Crusaders	Bronx	1949
Moore Catholic High School		Mavericks	Staten Island	1962
Mount Saint Michael Academy		Mountaineers	Bronx	1926
Notre Dame Academy		Gators	Staten Island	1903
Regis High School		Raiders	Manhattan	1914
Sacred Heart High School		Irish	Yonkers	1923
Salesian High School		Eagles	New Rochelle	1920
Archbishop Stepinac High School		Crusaders	White Plains	1948
St. Joseph Hill Academy		Hilltoppers	Staten Island	1919
St. Joseph by-the-Sea High School		Vikings	Staten Island	1963
St. Peter's Boys High School		Eagles	Staten Island	1917
St. Raymond High School for Boys		Ravens	Bronx	1960
The Ursuline School		Koalas	New Rochelle	1897
Xavier High School		Knights	Manhattan	1847

=== Brooklyn-Queens Section ===
The Brooklyn-Queens Section consists of schools in Brooklyn and Queens, corresponding to the Diocese of Brooklyn.

School	Colors	Team name	Location	Founded
Archbishop Molloy High School		Stanners	Queens	1957
Bishop Kearney High School		Tigers	Brooklyn	1961
Bishop Loughlin Memorial High School		Lions	Brooklyn	1851
Cathedral Preparatory School and Seminary		Crusaders	Queens	1914
Christ the King Regional High School		Royals	Queens	1963
Cristo Rey Brooklyn High School		Panthers	Brooklyn	2008
Fontbonne Hall Academy		Bonnies	Brooklyn	1937
Holy Cross High School		Knights	Queens	1955
The Mary Louis Academy		Hilltoppers	Queens	1936
Monsignor McClancy Memorial High School		Crusaders	Queens	1956
Nazareth Regional High School		Kingsmen	Brooklyn	1962
St. Edmund Preparatory High School		Eagles	Brooklyn	1932
St. Francis Preparatory School		Terriers	Queens	1858
St. John's Preparatory School		Red Storm	Queens	1980
St. Saviour High School		Pandas	Brooklyn	1917
Xaverian High School		Clippers	Brooklyn	1957

=== Nassau-Suffolk (Long Island) Section ===
The Nassau-Suffolk Section, also known as the Long Island section, consists of schools in Nassau and Suffolk counties, corresponding to the Diocese of Rockville Centre.

School	Colors	Team name	Location	Founded
Chaminade High School		Flyers	Mineola	1930
Holy Trinity High School		Titans	Hicksville	1966
Kellenberg Memorial High School		Firebirds	Uniondale	1987
Our Lady of Mercy Academy		Lady Mustangs	Syosset	1928
Sacred Heart Academy		Lady Spartans	Hempstead	1949
St. Anthony's High School		Friars	South Huntington	1933
St. Dominic High School		Bayhawks	Oyster Bay	1928
St. John the Baptist Diocesan High School		Cougars	West Islip	1966
St. Mary's High School		Gaels	Manhasset	1949

=== Buffalo Section ===
The Buffalo Section consists of schools in Buffalo area corresponding to the Diocese of Buffalo, and is also referred to as the Monsignor Martin Athletic Association. Unlike the other sections, membership is open to non-Catholic schools.

School	Colors	Team name	Location	Founded
Bishop Timon - St. Jude High School		Tigers	Buffalo	1946
Canisius High School		Crusaders	Buffalo	1870
Cardinal O'Hara High School		Hawks	Tonawanda	1961
Christian Central Academy		Crusaders	Williamsville	1949
Nichols School		Vikings	North Buffalo	1892
St. Francis High School		Red Raiders	Athol Springs	1927
St. Joseph's Collegiate Institute		Marauders	Kenmore	1861
St. Mary’s High School		Lancers	Lancaster	1904

=== Former members ===
School	Colors	Team name	Location	Founded	Closed
Academy of Saint Joseph		Dragons	Brentwood	1856	2009
Bishop Dubois High School		Lions	Manhattan	1946	1976
Bishop Ford Central Catholic High School		Falcons	Brooklyn	1962	2014
Blessed Sacrament-St. Gabriel High School		Cardinals	New Rochelle	1985	2013
Brooklyn Preparatory School		Eagles	Brooklyn	1908	1972
Catherine McAuley High School		Panthers	Brooklyn	1942	2013
De La Salle Institute			Manhattan	Late 1800s	1960
Holy Family High School		Chargers	South Huntington	1966	1984
Manhattan College High School		Jaspers	Manhattan	1854	1971
Power Memorial Academy		Panthers	Manhattan	1931	1984
Rice High School		Raiders	Manhattan	1938	2011
Seton Hall High School		Eagles	Patchogue	1937	1974
St. Agnes Boys High School		Stags	Manhattan	1914	2013
St. John Villa Academy		Bears	Staten Island	1922	2018
St. Nicholas of Tolentine High School		Wildcats	Bronx	1927	1991
St. Peter's High School for Girls		Eagles	Staten Island	1926	2011
St. Pius X Preparatory Seminary		Deacons	Uniondale	1961	1984

== See also ==
- New York state high school boys basketball championships
- List of New York state high school league conferences
