= List of schools in the Roman Catholic Diocese of Rockville Centre =

List of schools of the Roman Catholic Diocese of Rockville Centre.

As of 2019, there were nine Catholic schools on Long Island with high school divisions.

== 6-12 schools ==
- Private
- Kellenberg Memorial High School, Uniondale

== High schools ==
- Diocesan
- Holy Trinity Diocesan High School, Hicksville
- St. John the Baptist Diocesan High School, West Islip
  Private
- Chaminade High School, Mineola
- Our Lady of Mercy Academy, Syosset
- Sacred Heart Academy, Hempstead
- St. Anthony's High School, South Huntington
- St. Dominic High School, Oyster Bay
- St. Mary's High School, Manhasset

== Elementary and junior high schools ==
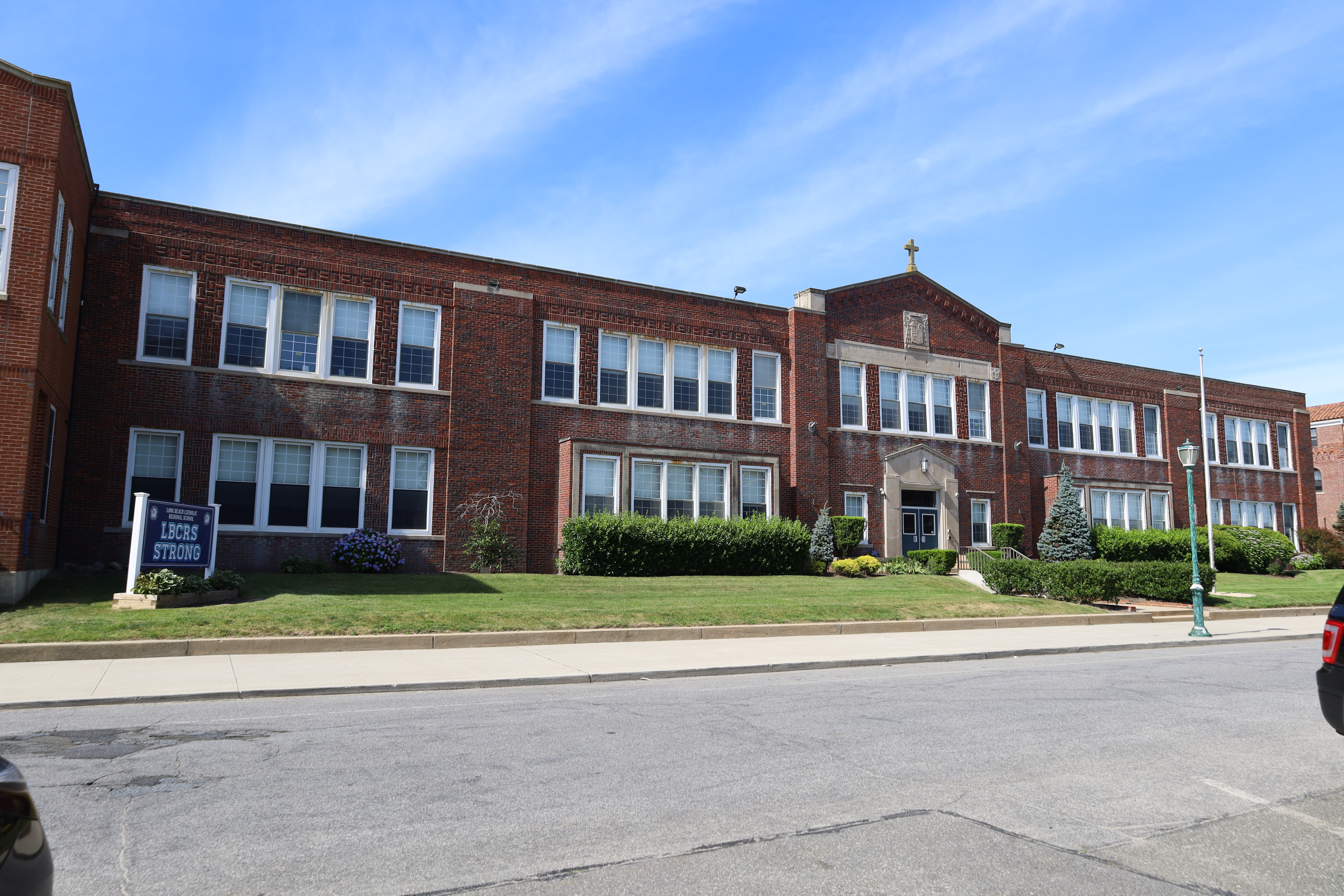
Long Beach Catholic Regional School

Diocesan

- Nassau County
- Holy Family School (Hicksville)
- Holy Name of Mary Catholic School (Valley Stream)
- Long Beach Catholic Regional School (Long Beach)
- Maria Regina School (Seaford)
- Notre Dame Catholic School (New Hyde Park)
- Our Lady of Lourdes School (Malverne)
- Our Lady of Peace School (Lynbrook)
- Our Lady of Victory Elementary School (Floral Park)
- St. Agnes Cathedral School (Rockville Centre)
- St. Aidan Catholic School (Williston Park)
- St. Anne's School (Garden City)
- St. Brigid/Our Lady of Hope Regional School (Westbury)
- St. Christopher Catholic School (Baldwin)
- St. Edward the Confessor School (Syosset)
- St. Elizabeth Ann Seton Regional (Bellmore)
- St. Joseph School (Garden City)
- St. Mary's Elementary School (Manhasset)
- St. Raymond Catholic School (East Rockaway)
- St. Rose of Lima Catholic School (Massapequa)
- St. Thomas the Apostle School (West Hempstead)
- St. William the Abbot School (Seaford)
  Suffolk County
- Holy Angels Regional School (Patchogue)
- Our Lady of Providence Regional School (Central Islip)
- Our Lady of the Hamptons (Southampton)
- Our Lady, Queen of the Apostles Regional Catholic School (Center Moriches)
- Ss Cyril and Methodius School (Deer Park)
- St. John Paul II Regional School (Riverhead)
- St. Martin of Tours Catholic School (Amityville)
- St. Mary School (East Islip)
- St. Patrick School, Bay Shore (Bay Shore)
- St. Patrick School, Huntington (Huntington)
- St. Patrick School, Smithtown (Smithtown)
- Sts. Philip and James School (St James)
- Trinity Regional School (East Northport)

Private (non-diocesan)

- Holy Child Academy (Old Westbury)
- The De La Salle School (Freeport)
- Our Lady of Grace Montessori School (Manhasset)
- St. Martin de Porres Marianist School (Uniondale)

== Former schools ==
In the 2000-2001 school year the archdiocese had 28,709 students at the elementary level. By the 2010-2011 school year this was 19,261, a decline of 34%. Six Catholic elementary schools closed in 2012, with 47 remaining. Both seminaries located in the Diocese of Rockville Centre, have been closed down mainly due to the declining numbers of priestly vocations. The Diocese of Rockville Centre currently has no active seminaries within its territory and currently uses the seminary facilities of the Diocese of Brooklyn and the Archdiocese of New York for its seminarians.

=== Seminaries ===
Nassau County

- St. Pius X Preparatory Seminary (Uniondale)- college/minor seminary of the Diocese that operated from 1961 to 1984

Suffolk County

- Seminary of the Immaculate Conception (Huntington)- operated from 1926 to 2012. The territory of Rockville Centre was part of the Diocese of Brooklyn until 1957, so the seminary was under Brooklyn's jurisdiction until 1957 and served as Brooklyn's major seminary. After the establishment of the Rockville Centre Diocese in 1957, the seminary fell under the jurisdiction of the newly established diocese since it was located in its territory. The Brooklyn Diocese continued to use the seminary as their major seminary along with Rockville Centre until 2012, when the seminary program was shut down and was transferred to St. Joseph's Seminary in Yonkers, NY. The seminary facility continues to be open today, serving mostly as a retreat center.

=== Closed K-12 schools ===
High schools

- Diocesan
- St. Pius X Preparatory Seminary (Uniondale)- High School Seminary that operated from 1961 to 1984
- Bishop McGann-Mercy Diocesan High School, Riverhead (closed in June 2018)
  Private
- Academy of Saint Joseph, Brentwood (Closed June 2009)

Elementary schools

- Blessed Sacrament School (Valley Stream) - Closed in June 2011
- Holy Family Regional School (Commack) - Four churches managed the school. Previously known as the Christ the King School, it is on the property of Christ the King Church. If all of the students, including nursery/preschool, are counted, enrollment from 2014 to 2020 declined by 38%, while if nursery/preschool students are excluded, enrollment declined by 43%. In 2020 it had 162 students total, with 23 in nursery/preschool. In the 2019–2020 school year about 30% of the institution's revenue, or over $400,000, came from the four churches. It closed in 2020 due to financial issues resulting from the COVID-19 pandemic)
- Our Lady of Mercy School (Hicksville) - Closing in 2020, with announcement made prior to the COVID-19 pandemic
- Our Lady of Perpetual Help School (Lindenhurst) - Closed in 2012
- Our Lady of Wisdom Regional Catholic School (Port Jefferson) - In 1938 it opened its doors, and four churches managed the school. If all of the students, including nursery/preschool, are counted, enrollment from 2014 to 2020 declined by 31%, while if nursery/preschool students are excluded, enrollment declined by 37%. In 2020 it had 79 students total, with 13 in nursery/preschool. In the 2019–2020 school year about 45% of the institution's revenue, or over $475,000, came from the four churches. It closed in 2020 due to financial issues resulting from the COVID-19 pandemic.
- Prince of Peace Regional School (Sayville) - Closed in 2012
- Sacred Heart Elementary School (North Merrick) - Closed in 2012
- St. Aloysius Elementary School (Great Neck) - Closed in 1990
- St. Boniface School (Elmont) - It was Long Island's first Roman Catholic school. The school was predominately German American on its founding and was heavily White American until the 1950s; after that point, more ethnic minorities became prominent in the student body. It closed in June 2004.
- St. Catherine of Sienna School (Franklin Square) - Closed in 2012
- St. Ignatius Loyola School (Hicksville) - Closed in 2012
- St. John Baptist De LaSalle Regional School (Farmingdale) - Closed in 2012
- Saint Peter of Alcantara Catholic Elementary School (Port Washington) - In 1925 it opened its doors. If all of the students, including nursery/preschool, are counted, enrollment from 2014 to 2020 declined by 36%, while if nursery/preschool students are excluded, enrollment declined by 52%. In 2020 it had 176 students total, with 77 in nursery/preschool. The diocese and the congregation spent $220,000 to keep the school open in the 2018–2019 school year. It closed in 2020 due to financial issues resulting from the COVID-19 pandemic.
- St. Vincent de Paul School (Elmont) - Closed in 1994
