= List of schools in the Roman Catholic Diocese of Brooklyn =

This is a list of schools in the Roman Catholic Diocese of Brooklyn.

== High schools ==
There are three diocesan and/or parish high schools under the auspices of the Diocese of Brooklyn and Queens. While the Catholic high schools below may geographically lie within the diocese, most are run independently of it.

Brooklyn

- Bishop Loughlin Memorial High School (Fort Greene)
- Cristo Rey Brooklyn High School (East Flatbush)
- Fontbonne Hall Academy (Fort Hamilton)
- Nazareth Regional High School (East Flatbush)
- St. Edmund Preparatory High School (Homecrest)
- Saint Saviour High School of Brooklyn (Park Slope)
- Xaverian High School (Bay Ridge)

Queens

- Archbishop Molloy High School (Briarwood)
- Cathedral Preparatory Seminary (Elmhurst)
- Christ the King Regional High School (Middle Village)
- Holy Cross High School (Murray Hill, Flushing)
- Monsignor McClancy Memorial High School (East Elmhurst)
- St. Francis Preparatory School (Fresh Meadows)
- St. John's Preparatory School (Ditmars-Steinway, Astoria)
- The Mary Louis Academy (Jamaica Estates)

== Elementary schools ==
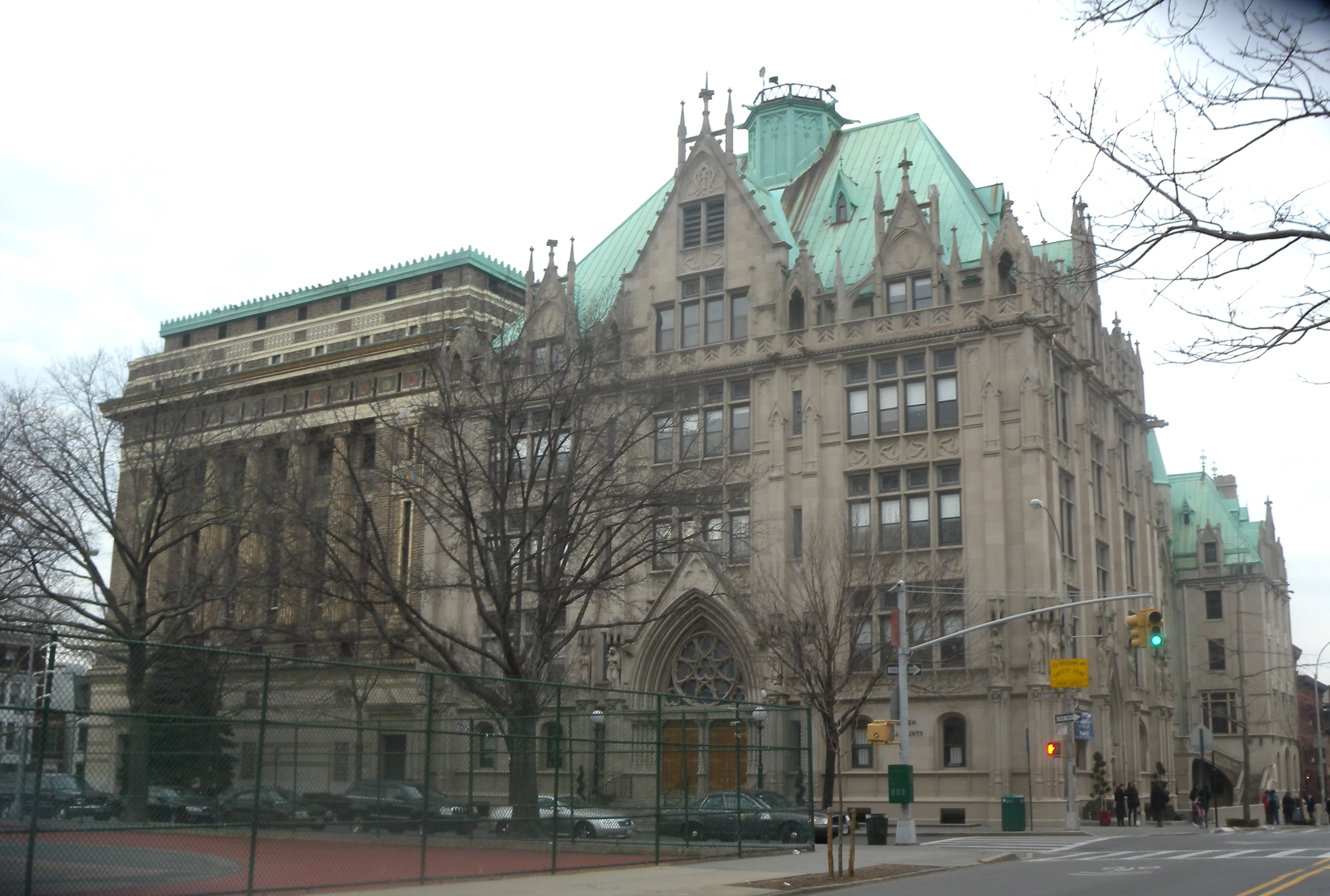
Queen of All Saints School, Fort Greene

There were 116 diocesan and parish elementary schools in the Diocese of Brooklyn and Queens including Saint Patrick Catholic Academy located at 9707 4th Ave New York. In March 2009. In the fall of 2009, a new free tuition school called the Pope John Paul II Family Academy opened at St. Barbara's School in Bushwick, Brooklyn.http://s3.amazonaws.com/vspot_prod_images/uploads/group/image/70349/77009186205980060.png In 2019 two Diocese of Brooklyn elementary schools– Our Lady of Guadalupe Catholic Academy in Bensonhurst, and Mary Queen of Heaven Catholic Academy in Mill Basin - permanently closed, and two Bushwick schools, St Brigid and St. Frances Cabrini, merged.

Brooklyn

- Bay Ridge Catholic Academy
- Blessed Sacrament Catholic Academy
- Brooklyn Jesuit Prep
- Good Shepherd Catholic Academy
- Holy Angels Catholic Academy
- Holy Rosary Catholic School, Bedford-Stuyvesant, Brooklyn
- Midwood Catholic Academy (Midwood)
- Our Lady of Grace Catholic Academy
- Our Lady of Perpetual Help Catholic Academy of Brooklyn
- Our Lady of Trust Catholic Academy
- Our Lady of Victory Catholic School, Bedford Stuyvesant, Brooklyn
- St. Anselm Catholic Academy
- St. Athanasius Catholic Academy
- St. Bernadette Catholic Academy
- St. Bernard Catholic Academy
- St. Brigid-St. Frances Cabrini Catholic Academy (Bushwick) - It formed from the 2019 merger of the St. Brigid and St. Frances Cabrini schools, with students at St. Brigid. In 2019 it had about 100 students.
- St. Catherine of Genoa ~ St. Therese of Lisieux Catholic Academy
- St. Edmund School
- St. Ephrem Catholic Academy
- St. Francis of Assisi Catholic Academy
- St. Francis Xavier Catholic Academy – Early Childhood
- St. Gregory the Great Catholic Academy
- St. Joseph the Worker Catholic Academy
- St. Mark Catholic Academy
- St. Patrick Catholic Academy
- St. Peter Catholic Academy
- St. Saviour Catholic Academy
- St. Stanislaus Kostka Catholic Academy
- Salve Regina Catholic Academy
- Visitation Catholic Academy

Queens

- Divine Wisdom Catholic Academy (Douglaston)
- Holy Child Jesus Catholic Academy (Richmond Hill)
- Holy Family Catholic Academy (Flushing)
- Immaculate Conception Catholic Academy (Astoria)
- Immaculate Conception Catholic Academy (Jamaica)
- Incarnation Catholic Academy (Queens Village)
- Notre Dame Catholic Academy of Ridgewood (Ridgewood)
- Our Lady of Fatima School (East Elmhurst)
- Our Lady of Grace Catholic Academy (Howard Beach)
- Our Lady of Hope Catholic Academy (Middle Village)
- Our Lady of Mercy Catholic Academy (Forest Hills)
- Our Lady of Perpetual Help Catholic Academy (South Ozone Park)
- Our Lady of Sorrows Catholic Academy (Corona)
- Our Lady of the Blessed Sacrament Catholic Academy (Bayside)
- Our Lady of the Snows Catholic Academy (Floral Park)
- Our Lady Queen of Martyrs Catholic Academy (Forest Hills)
- Resurrection-Ascension Catholic Academy (Rego Park)
- Sacred Heart Catholic Academy (Cambria Heights)
- Sacred Heart Catholic Academy of Bayside (Bayside)
- Sacred Heart Catholic Academy of Glendale (Glendale)
- St. Adalbert Catholic Academy (Elmhurst)
- St. Andrew Avellino Catholic Academy (Flushing)
- St. Bartholomew Catholic Academy (Elmhurst)
- St. Clare Catholic Academy (Rosedale)
- St. Elizabeth Catholic Academy (Ozone Park)
- St. Francis de Sales Catholic Academy (Belle Harbor)
- St. Francis of Assisi Catholic Academy (Astoria)
- St Gregory the Great Catholic Academy (Bellerose)
- St. Helen Catholic Academy (Howard Beach)
- St. Joan of Arc School (Jackson Heights)
- St. Joseph Catholic Academy (Long Island City)
- St. Kevin Catholic Academy (Flushing)
- St. Leo Catholic Academy (Corona)
- St. Luke School (Whitestone)
- St. Margaret Catholic Academy (Middle Village)
- St. Mary Gate of Heaven Catholic Academy (Ozone Park)
- St. Matthias Catholic Academy (Ridgewood)
- St. Mel's Catholic Academy (Flushing)
- St. Michael's Catholic Academy (Flushing)
- St. Nicholas of Tolentine Catholic Academy (Jamaica)
- St. Rose of Lima Catholic Academy (Rockaway Beach)
- St. Sebastian Catholic Academy (Woodside)
- St. Stanislaus Kostka Catholic Academy of Queens (Maspeth)
- St. Thomas the Apostle Catholic Academy (Woodhaven)
- Saints Joachim and Anne School (Queens Village)

== Former schools ==
In the 1980s the diocese had about 102 schools. From the mid-2000s to 2019 the diocese had closed 45 schools. By 2019 36 remained. Three grade schools were scheduled to close in 2019, and that year another two grade schools were to merge. Another six schools were scheduled to close in 2020, with the six collectively being owed $600,000 in tuition.

=== Seminaries ===
Brooklyn

- Cathedral College (Clinton Hill)- operated from 1914 to 1967. Served as the minor seminary for the Diocese of Brooklyn. The college moved to Douglaston, Queens in 1967 and the high school seminary moved to Elmhurst, Queens in 1964

Queens

- Cathedral College and Seminary House of Formation(Douglaston)- operated from 1967 to 2023. Served as the minor seminary for the Diocese of Brooklyn, the Archdiocese of New York and the Diocese of Rockville Centre. Seminary program closed in 2023.

Outside of the Diocese (Suffolk County)

- Seminary of the Immaculate Conception (Huntington)- operated from 1926 to 2012. Served as the major seminary for Diocese of Brooklyn. The seminary was under the jurisdiction of the Diocese of Brooklyn from 1926 to 1957, the seminary fell under the jurisdiction of Diocese of Rockville Centre in 1957, when the Diocese was established. Brooklyn seminarians studied alongside seminarians from Rockville Centre from 1957 till 2012, when the Seminary ended its program for seminarians.

=== High schools ===
Brooklyn

- Bishop McDonnell Memorial High School for Girls - closed in 1973
- Bishop Kearney High School (Bensonhurst, Brooklyn)- closed in 2019, staffed by the Sisters of St. Joseph Brentwood
- St. Joseph High School- closed in 2020, staffed by the Sisters of St. Joseph
- Bishop Ford Central Catholic High School(Windsor Terrace)- closed in 2014, operated and staffed by the Franciscan Brothers of Brooklyn

==== Queens ====
- St. Agnes High School (College Point) - closed in 2021 due to financial constraints.

=== Grade schools ===
Brooklyn

- Mary Queen of Heaven Catholic Academy (Mill Basin) - From circa 2014 to 2019 the enrollment declined by 60%, and in 2019 the school had $300,000 in debt. The school closed in 2019. Post-closure the school administration suggested students apply to other schools, naming Midwood Catholic Academy and St. Bernard Catholic Academy as possibilities. The Canarsie Courier stated that St. Bernard was the closest remaining Catholic school.
- Our Lady of Guadalupe School (Bensonhurst) - It was nicknamed "OLG" in the neighborhood. In 2012 the school had 217 students, but by 2019 enrollment was 120. That year its fund balance was $559,633 and its deficit was $215,377. It closed in 2019.
- Queen of the Rosary Catholic Academy (East Williamsburg) Closed in 2020 Parents held a march asking the diocese to keep the school open.
- St Brigid School (Bushwick)
- St. Frances Cabrini (Bushwick)
- St. Gregory the Great School (Crown Heights and Flatbush) - Closed in 2020

Queens

- Corpus Christi School (Woodside) - Closed in 2012.
- Holy Trinity Catholic Academy (Whitestone) - Closed in 2020
- La Salle School, formerly known as St. Gabriel's School until 2008 (East Elmhurst) - Closed in 2011 due to financial constraints.
- Our Lady's Catholic Academy (South Ozone Park) - Includes the Rockaway Campus and the 128th Street Campus - Closed in 2020
- St. Camillus Catholic Academy (Rockaway Park) - From 2014 to 2019 enrollment declined by about 25%. The school was scheduled to close in 2019.
