= CHSAA =

CHSAA may refer to:

- Catholic High School Athletic Association, an athletic association in New York
- Colorado High School Activities Association, the high school activities governing body in Colorado
