= BKHS =

BKHS may refer to:

- Bishop Kearney High School (Irondequoit, New York), United States
- Bishop Kearney High School (New York City), United States
- Bishop Kelley High School, Tulsa, Oklahoma, United States
- Bishop Kelly High School, Boise, Idaho, United States
- Bishop Kenny High School, Jacksonville, Florida, United States
