= St. Joseph's University, New York =

Private college in Brooklyn and Long Island

Coordinates: 40°41′27″N 73°58′05″W

St. Joseph's University
- Former names: St. Joseph's College for Women (1916–1970); St. Joseph's College (1970–2022)
- Motto: Esse non videri
- Motto in English: To be, not to seem
- Type: Private university
- Established: 1916; 110 years ago
- Religious affiliation: Catholic (Sisters of St. Joseph)
- President: Donald R. Boomgaarden
- Provost: Heather Barry
- Faculty: Full-time: 159 (2023); Part-time: 481
- Students: 3,899 (fall 2024)
- Undergraduates: 3,173 (fall 2024)
- Postgraduates: 726 (fall 2024)
- Location: Brooklyn and Patchogue, New York, United States
- Campus: Brooklyn - Urban Long Island - Suburban
- Colors: Blue and Gold
- Nicknames: St. Joe's Brooklyn - Bears; St. Joe's Long Island - Golden Eagles
- Sporting affiliations: NCAA Division III; Skyline, ECAC
- Mascots: Brooklyn - Vandy; Long Island - Hot Wyngz
- Website: sjny.edu
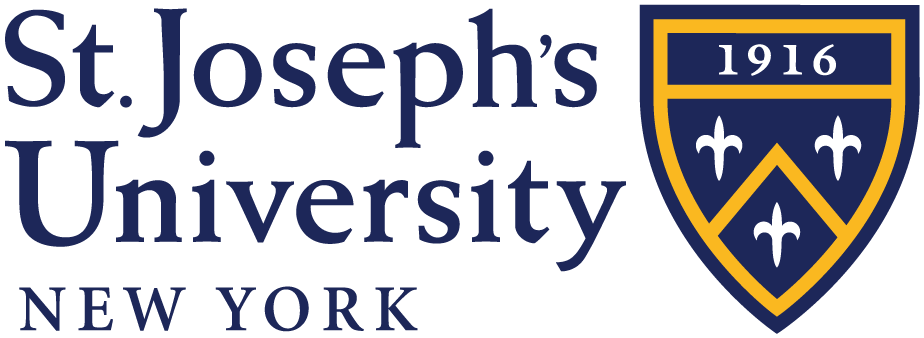

St. Joseph's University, New York (SJNY, SJU or St. Joe's) is a private Catholic university in New York State, United States, with campuses in Brooklyn and Long Island. The university provides education at the undergraduate and graduate levels, offering degrees in more than 54 majors and other programs.

== History ==
Originally named "St. Joseph's College for Women", the college was founded by the Sisters of St. Joseph of Brentwood under the leaders of their superior Mother Mary Louis in response to the need for a day college for young women. It is the only historical women's college in the New York City borough of Brooklyn. SJC received its provisional charter from the Regents of the University of the State of New York in 1916.

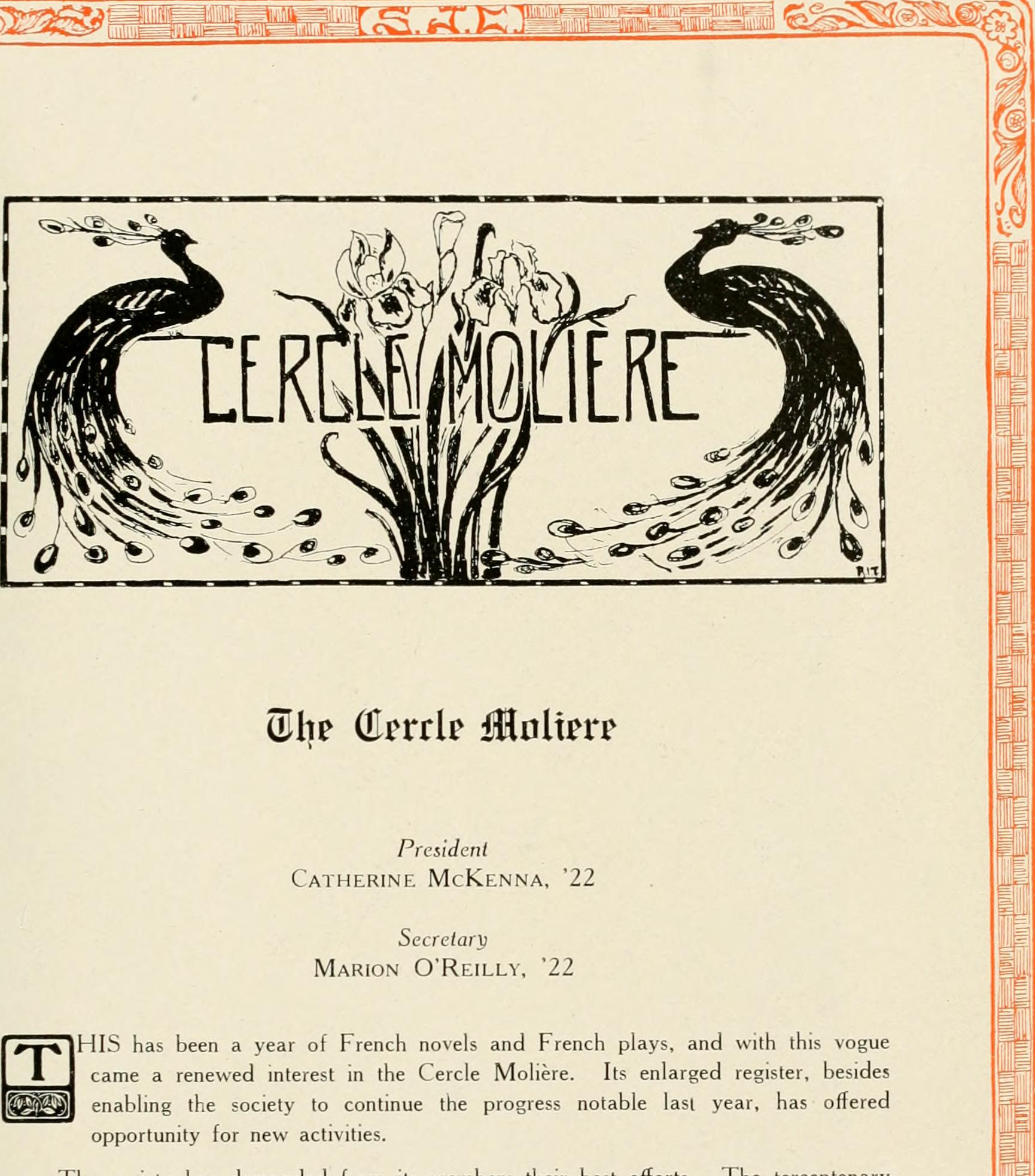
St. Joseph's College 1922 students yearbook

After the college outgrew its original Brooklyn facilities at 286 Washington Avenue, it moved to its present site at 245 Clinton Avenue in 1918. The college's first baccalaureate degrees were conferred on fourteen graduates in 1920 and the first valedictorian was Beverly Stubbenhouser. The college was accredited in 1928 by a predecessor to the institution's current institutional accreditor, the Middle States Commission on Higher Education. The regents granted St. Joseph's College an absolute charter in 1929. St. Joseph's opened a laboratory preschool, the Dillon Child Study Center, in 1934 following several years of research in the field of child development. McEntegart Hall, a multi-functional building housing the library and classrooms, opened in 1965.

In 1970, a charter amendment changed the name to "St. Joseph's College" and enabled the college to admit the first male students to full matriculation. On February 2, 1971, St. Joseph's inaugurated an extension program in the collegiate center formerly known as Brentwood College and moved to develop a degree program in Brentwood oriented to the third and fourth years of college. This Upper Division baccalaureate program opened in September 1972 and the Board of Regents of the University of the State of New York authorized St. Joseph's College to join Long Island University C.W. Post Campus in a Coordinate Campus program, the first such pattern adopted in the state. In 1976, this Suffolk County operation was authorized by the regents to operate as a branch campus. In 1978, St. Joseph's College expanded its operation at the Suffolk Branch Campus to a full four-year program and in 1979 moved to a 25-acre campus in Patchogue, that was previously home to Seton Hall High School.

Since then, the Long Island Campus has expanded to include the Clare Rose Playhouse, the Callahan Library, the John A. Danzi Athletic Center, the 33,000-square-foot Business Technology Center, and most recently, the 24.8 acre, outdoor athletic facility. The Brooklyn Campus has expanded with the purchase of a five-story brownstone for staff and faculty office space and St. Angela Hall Academy for additional classrooms.

In April 2022, the Board of Regents of the University of the State of New York approved the name change from St. Joseph's College to St. Joseph's University.

== Academics ==
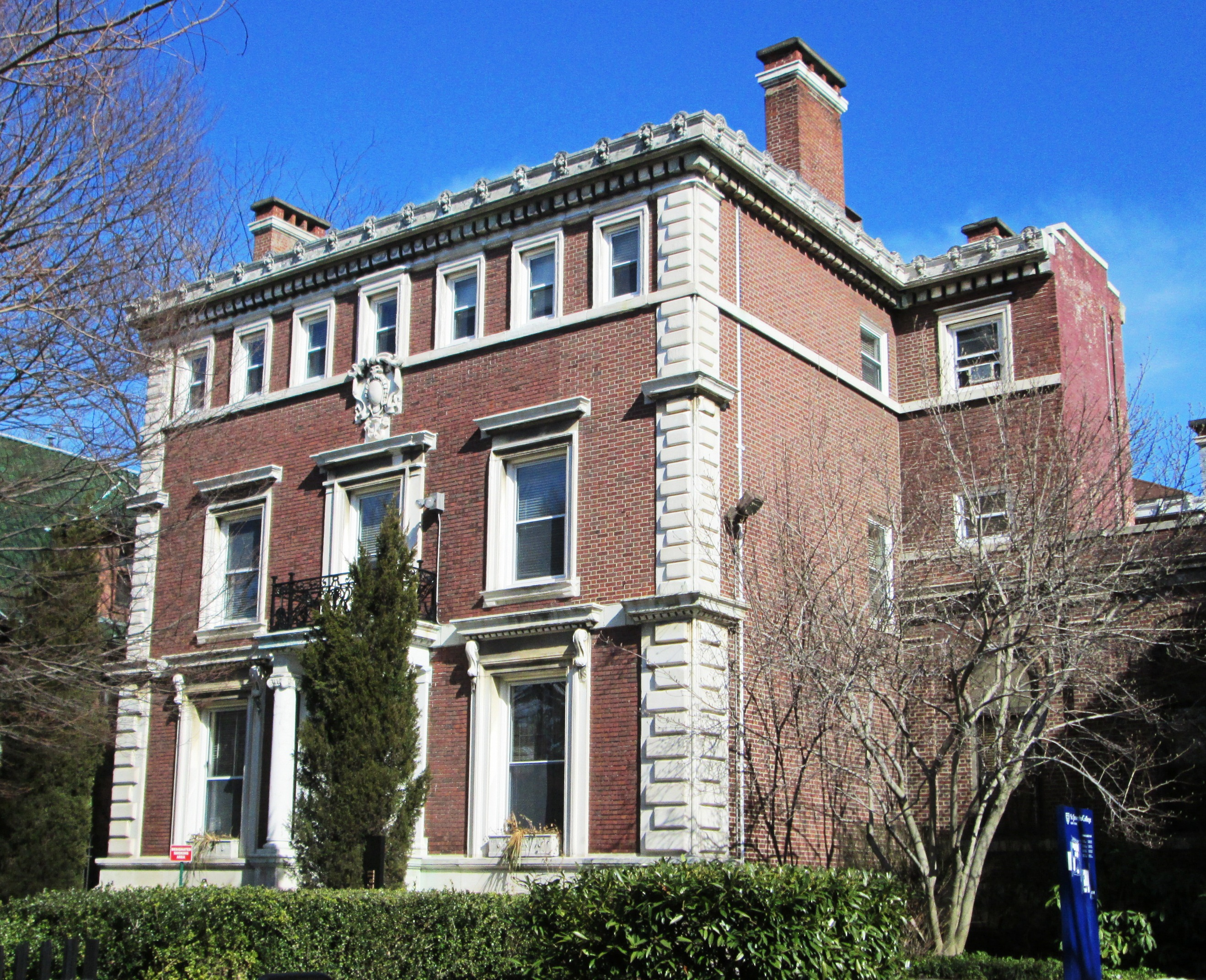
Burns Hall

St. Joseph's University offers degrees in over 50 majors, special course offerings and certificates, affiliated and pre-professional programs through its School of Arts and Sciences and its School of Professional and Graduate Studies, as well as 21 graduate degrees. The university has 3,774 undergraduate students and 913 graduate students as of Fall 2021. SJU has seen 9% enrollment declines since 2019. Only 25% of faculty are full-time, while the average for institutions offering master's and bachelor's degrees is 50%.

=== Admission ===
Approximately 71% of applicants were admitted in 2020. The SAT average is 1100, placing the student body at the 59th percentile of examinees. The enrollment yield is 20.2%, indicating that 20.2% of students admitted actually choose to attend SJU.

=== Rankings ===
SJU is not nationally ranked by Times Higher Education. Within US News regional rankings, as of 2023, SJU ranks 48th out of 175 total schools.

SJU Online is ranked by US News 168th for online bachelor's degrees out of 383 total schools, and offers 27 bachelor, master, and certificate programs online. SJU Online is ranked 14th of 22 total NY schools in the online rankings.

=== Tuition ===
SJUs tuition for Fall 2021 was $31,760 per year, substantially higher than the NY state average for in-state students of $7,186.

== Athletics ==
=== St. Joseph's Bears ===
The St. Joseph's–Brooklyn athletic teams are called the Bears. The campus is a member of the Division III ranks of the National Collegiate Athletic Association (NCAA), primarily competing in the Skyline Conference since the 2015–16 academic year.

Prior joining to the NCAA, they were previously a member of the United States Collegiate Athletic Association (USCAA), and competed in the following athletic conferences: the Hudson Valley Men's Athletic Conference (HVMAC) for men's sports; and the Hudson Valley Women's Athletic Conference (HVWAC) for women's sports.

St. Joseph's–Brooklyn competes in 13 intercollegiate varsity sports: Men's sports include baseball, basketball, cross country, soccer, tennis & volleyball; while women's sports include basketball, cross country, soccer, softball, swimming, tennis & volleyball.

=== St. Joseph's Golden Eagles ===
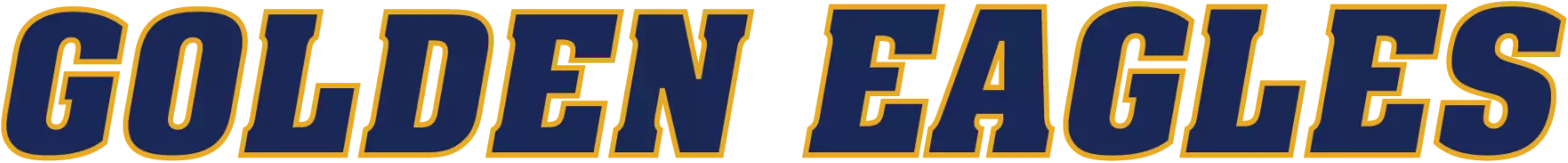
St. Joseph's (Long Island) athletics wordmark

The St. Joseph's–Long Island athletic teams are called the Golden Eagles. The campus is a member of the Division III ranks of the National Collegiate Athletic Association (NCAA), primarily competing in the Skyline Conference since the 1999–2000 academic year.

St. Joseph's–Long Island competes in 16 intercollegiate varsity sports: Men's sports include baseball, basketball, cross country, golf, lacrosse, soccer, tennis & volleyball; while women's sports include basketball, cross country, golf, lacrosse, men's and women's soccer, softball, tennis & volleyball.

The Long Island Campus of St. Joseph's University has a 24.8 acre, outdoor sports facility, which are now home to their baseball, softball, lacrosse, soccer, and tennis teams.
