= Tom Junod =

American journalist

- Junod at the 2026 Texas Book Festival
- Born: Thomas Christopher Junod; April 9, 1958 (age 68); Wantagh, New York, U.S.
- Education: University at Albany, SUNY (BA)
- Occupation: Journalist
- Spouse: Janet Folk
- Children: 1

Thomas Christopher Junod (born April 9, 1958) is an American journalist who is currently a senior writer for ESPN.com. He is the recipient of two National Magazine Awards from the American Society of Magazine Editors.

== Early life ==
Thomas Christopher Junod was born as the youngest child of Lou and Fran Junod. His family was of French, German, and Swiss ancestry. His father Lou often traveled for his job selling handbags. Junod has written about Lou's secret affairs in his 2026 memoir, In the Days of My Youth I Was Told What It Means To Be a Man.

Junod attended Holy Trinity Diocesan High School, graduating in 1976. In 1980, Junod graduated with a Bachelor of Arts degree in English from the State University of New York at Albany.

== Career ==
Junod worked as a writer for Esquire magazine beginning in 1997, after following editor David Granger to the magazine from GQ. He also worked for Atlanta magazine, Life, and Sports Illustrated. Junod has published award-winning pieces for several magazines. Among his notable works are The Abortionist, The Rapist Says He's Sorry, The Falling Man and a controversial 2001 piece on R.E.M. lead singer Michael Stipe, in which he satirically fabricated information for an interview that never happened. As of November 2019, he is a writer for ESPN.com. In 2022, Junod and Paula Lavigne published a story that uncovered the crimes of Penn State football player Todd Hodne in the 1970s.

Junod is also noted for his Esquire profile of Fred Rogers. Junod has stated that his encounter with Rogers changed his perspective on life. The event is the premise of the 2019 feature film A Beautiful Day in the Neighborhood. Junod also appeared in the critically acclaimed 2018 documentary Won't You Be My Neighbor?.

Among his controversial articles, Junod came to regret the tone of his 1997 profile of Kevin Spacey for Esquire that "more or less outed the actor". At the time Spacey described the profile as "mean-spirited" and "homophobic" and called for a boycott of both the author and publication. "That story had the reek of bad faith to it, to be quite honest with you," Junod admitted when interviewed by Atlanta Magazine in 2019, noting that the negative response to his Kevin Spacey profile had stalled his career prior to his 1998 Fred Rogers assignment.

== Private life ==
Junod is married to Janet (née Folk) Junod. The couple met in university.

== Awards ==
Junod is the recipient of two National Magazine Awards from the American Society of Magazine Editors; one for a profile of John Britton, an abortion doctor, and one for a profile of a rapist undergoing therapy while enduring what is known as "civil commitment." Two other pieces by him were finalists for the same award.

In 2011, Junod won the James Beard Award for his essay "My Mom Couldn't Cook", published in Esquire in September 2010.

== Bibliography ==
- Junod, Tom (2026). In the Days of My Youth I Was Told What It Means to Be a Man. Doubleday. ISBN 9780375400391.
