= Jay Hernandez (basketball) =

American basketball player and coach

Brooklyn Nets
- Title: Assistant coach
- League: NBA

Personal information
- Born: Long Island, New York, U.S.
- Listed height: 6 ft 0 in (1.83 m)
- Listed weight: 190 lb (86 kg)

Career information
- High school: St. Dominic (Oyster Bay, New York)
- College: New Hampshire (1996–1997); Hofstra (1998–2001)
- NBA draft: 2001: undrafted
- Position: Point guard
- Coaching career: 2014–present

Career history

Coaching
- 2014–2016: Orlando Magic (player development coach)
- 2016–2018: Orlando Magic (assistant)
- 2018–2023: Charlotte Hornets (assistant)
- 2023–present: Brooklyn Nets (assistant)

Jason Hernandez is an American professional basketball coach and former player who is an assistant coach for the Brooklyn Nets of the National Basketball Association (NBA).

== High school career ==
Hernandez attended St. Dominic High School in Oyster Bay, New York.

== College career ==
Hernandez was first recruited by New Hampshire, where he played college basketball for one season in 1996–1997.

After his lone season with New Hampshire, Hernandez transferred to Hofstra. He played three seasons with the Pride from 1998 to 2001 and was a starter during all three seasons. In 2000 and 2001, Hernandez helped Hofstra to back-to-back NCAA tournament appearances.

== Professional career ==
While in college, Hernandez spent his offseasons away from school playing professional basketball in Puerto Rico. Hernandez played three seasons professionally for the Guaynabo Mets, Aibonito Polluelos, and Cayey Toritos in the Baloncesto Superior Nacional league in Puerto Rico.

== Coaching career ==
=== Orlando Magic (2014-2018) ===
In 2014, Hernandez was named as a player development coach for the Orlando Magic.

In 2016, Hernandez was named as an assistant coach for the Magic under new head coach Frank Vogel.

=== Charlotte Hornets (2018-2023) ===
In 2018, Hernandez was hired as an assistant coach with the Charlotte Hornets under head coach James Borrego.

In 2021, Hernandez also coached the Greensboro Swarm, the NBA G-League affiliate of the Hornets.

=== Brooklyn Nets (2023-present) ===
In 2023, Hernandez was named as an assistant coach for the Brooklyn Nets.

== Personal life ==
Hernandez is a native of Long Island, New York. Hernandez graduated from Hofstra University with an MBA in marketing and management. He is married to his wife Allison with whom he has three children, McKayla, Michael, and Morgan.
