= Maria Regina High School =

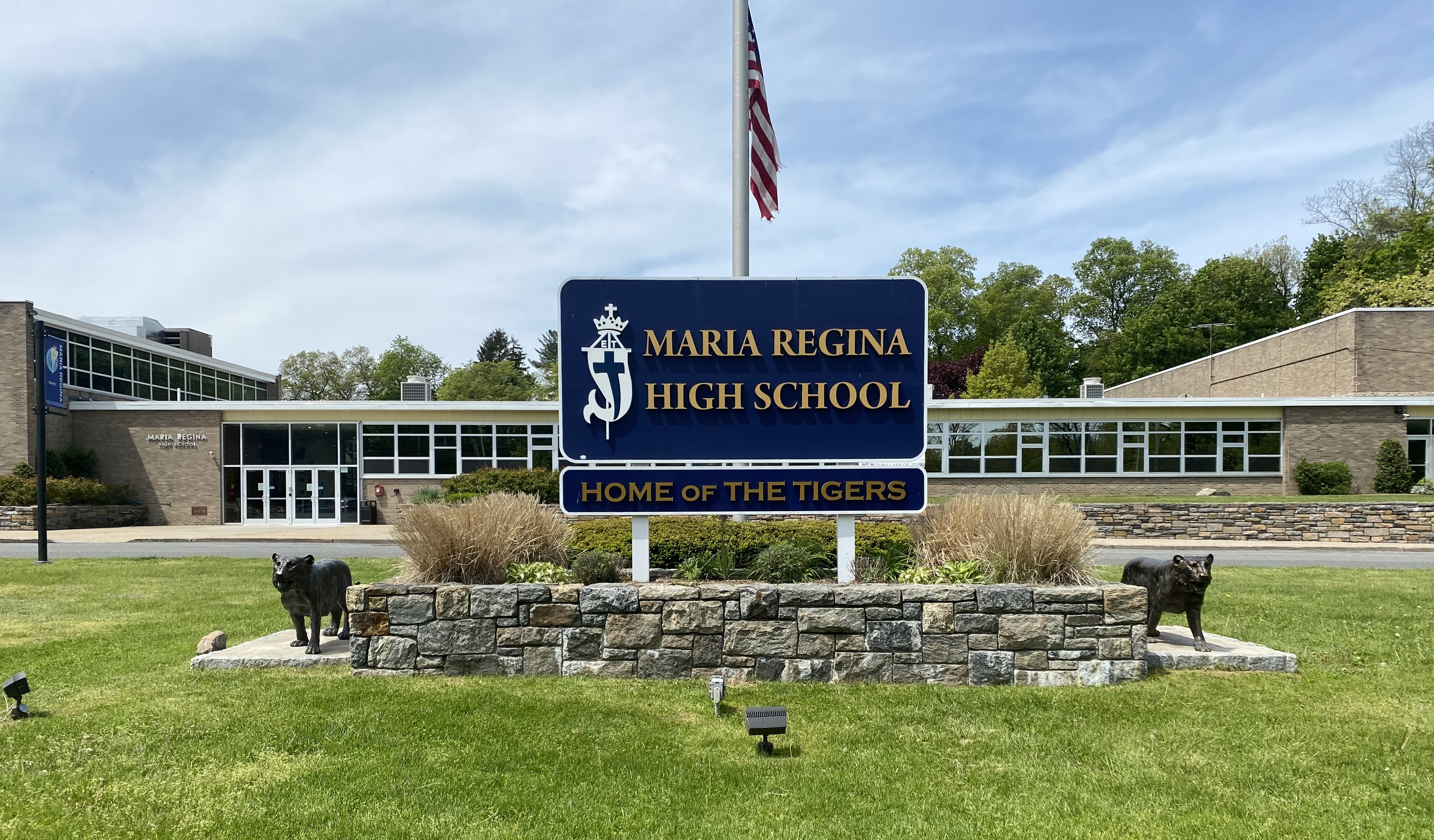

Location
- 500 West Hartsdale Avenue; Hartsdale, Westchester County, New York 10530; United States
- 41°1′59″N 73°48′36″W

Information
- Type: Private, all-female
- Motto: Caritate et Veritate (With Charity and Truth)
- Religious affiliation: Roman Catholic
- Established: 1957 (69 years ago)
- Founder: Sisters of the Resurrection
- CEEB code: 332287
- President: Anna Parra
- Principal: Maria Carozza-McCaffrey
- Faculty: 68
- Teaching staff: 41
- Grades: 9–12
- Enrollment: 500
- Average class size: 24
- Student to teacher ratio: 13:1
- Colors: Royal blue and white
- Athletics: Yes
- Athletics conference: Catholic High School Athletic Association
- Sports: basketball, cheerleading, cross- country running, soccer, softball, tennis, volleyball
- Mascot: Tiger
- Team name: Tigers
- Accreditation: National Catholic Educational Association (NCEA)
- Publication: Tiger Print (online literary magazine)
- Newspaper: Queen's Banner
- Yearbook: Reginian
- Tuition: $13,500
- Website: mariaregina.org

Maria Regina High School, commonly referred to as Maria or MRHS, is an American Catholic, college-preparatory high school (grades 9–12) for girls founded by the Sisters of the Resurrection, located in Hartsdale, New York.

== History ==
In 1957, Maria Regina High School was proposed by Francis Cardinal Spellman and the Sisters of the Resurrection were tasked with founding the first archdiocesan girls’ high school in Westchester County.

On February 2, 1959, Maria Regina's first freshman and sophomore classes entered.

== Admission ==
School admission is determined through the student's results on the TACHS test. The school also looks at the student's academic record for the 6th, 7th, and 8th grades, and results on standardized examinations for the 6th and 7th grades.

=== Scholarships ===
The school offers several partial scholarships and one full scholarship, all of which are awarded based on the results of the TACHS examination. The highest scorers who put Maria Regina as their first choice receive the scholarships. For this scholarship to be renewed every year, the student must have an overall average greater than 90 percent at the end of each academic year. Students who are awarded scholarships tend to be placed in honors classes.

== Academics ==
The school offers a rigorous college preparatory program. Graduation requires successful completion of a four-year course of study. A total of at least 26 credits is required. The Maria Regina program includes four years of mathematics, English, social studies, and theology; three years of science and a foreign language; and one year of art and music, although many students opt to take four years of science and a foreign language, and more than one year of art. Physical education and health are requirements for graduation. Honors classes are available in all disciplines, except theology, and AP classes are offered in classes including biology, chemistry, English literature, American history, and European history. There is a wide variety of electives to choose from for juniors and seniors, such as introduction to Law, 3D Printing, and Criminal Justice.

The school sponsors the College Link Program, in which college courses offered at Iona College and St. Thomas Aquinas College can be taken by Maria Regina students. Students enrolled in this program have the opportunity to earn college credits that can be transferred to their colleges of choice.

== Athletics ==
Maria Regina High School is an active member in the Catholic High School Athletic Association. Other member high schools include Cardinal Spellman, Mt. St. Ursula, Preston, and Sacred Heart.

All Maria Regina teams compete in non-conference tournaments, games, and matches so that the schedules are highly competitive. Athletes are required to successfully complete and maintain the same courseload as other students. Over one-fourth of the student body participates in interscholastic after-school athletics programs.

- cheerleading – varsity and gameday
- cross country – varsity
- soccer – varsity
- tennis – varsity
- volleyball – junior varsity and varsity

Winter:

- basketball – freshman, junior varsity, and varsity
- cheerleading – junior varsity and varsity

Spring:

- softball – junior varsity and varsity
- track and field
- flag football

== Notable alumni ==
- Mary Calvi, television journalist
- Patricia Canzoneri-Fitzpatrick, attorney and member of the New York State Senate
