= Todd Hodne =

American football player and criminal (1959–2020)

Todd Steven Hodne (April 23, 1959 – April 29, 2020) was a convicted rapist and murderer from Wantagh, Long Island, New York.

Hodne gained notoriety for a series of sexual assaults he committed while attending Penn State University, as well as in his hometown afterward; he committed at least twelve rapes and sexual assault attacks in 1978 and 1979. In 1987 Hodne killed a taxi driver during a robbery and was convicted of murder, spending the remainder of his life in prison. A lengthy ESPN.com article by Tom Junod and Paula Lavigne in 2022 led to national interest in Hodne's crimes and their connection to Penn State football, which had already been through another sexual assault controversy several years earlier involving former assistant coach Jerry Sandusky (who, coincidentally, was on the Penn State staff at the time of Hodne's assaults).

== Background ==
Hodne played linebacker on the football team at St. Dominic High School in Oyster Bay, New York. He was recruited to Penn State where, as a freshman, he played in at least seven games, including the 1977 Fiesta Bowl. In the summer before his sophomore year, he along with two friends from Long Island broke into and robbed a record store; after being arrested on burglary charges, he was suspended from the team for the season, though coach Joe Paterno said he could return to the team "if he has a good academic year and if he proves to us that [the robbery] was a mistake."

== Rape conviction ==
It later emerged that Hodne had sexually assaulted at least two Penn State students while attending the university. He was brought up on trial in the matter of the second case and was convicted. He was expelled from Penn State in December. Instead of being remanded to custody before sentencing, Hodne was allowed bail and returned home, where he resumed his predatory behavior. He was arrested in May 1979 on four counts of first-degree rape, among other charges. Hodne entered a plea agreement in September of that year, where he pled guilty to two of the rape counts as well as two counts of sexual abuse and one of attempted second-degree robbery. He was sentenced to a minimum of seven years and a maximum of twenty-one years, which were to be served consecutively with his term for his Pennsylvania conviction.

== Parole ==
In 1986, Hodne came up for parole. Despite the objections of the Nassau County prosecutor who tried the case, who wrote a letter to the parole board of Eastern New York Correctional Facility, where he had been serving his sentence, detailing Hodne's rape spree once he returned to Wantagh from Pennsylvania, the parole board voted unanimously to release Hodne. He once again returned to Wantagh, where he got a job working for his family's home improvement company, and began seeing a therapist regularly.

However, Hodne repeatedly violated the terms of his parole. He became addicted to crack cocaine, lost his job, and stopped attending his therapy sessions. He was evicted from his girlfriend's apartment in nearby Bethpage after the woman's landlord discovered he was living there, then left a rehabilitation center after a week.

== Murder ==
On August 11, 1987, Hodne called for a taxi to pick him up at a White Castle restaurant in Huntington, New York. Hodne attempted to rob the driver with a knife, then strangled him.

Tracked down by a police dog, Hodne said he and the driver had been attempting to find drugs to buy. He was released, but after the driver died, he was charged with murder. He was convicted and given a sentence of 25 years to life in prison. He later recanted his self-defense claim at his one and only parole hearing on the murder conviction.

== Death ==
Hodne died on April 29, 2020, from cancer.
