= Greensboro Swarm =

American professional basketball team of the NBA G League

- Conference: Eastern
- League: NBA G League
- Founded: 2016
- History: Greensboro Swarm; 2016–present
- Arena: Greensboro Coliseum Complex
- Location: Greensboro, North Carolina
- Team colors: Dark purple, teal, cool gray, white
- President: Steve Swetoha
- General manager: Mike Pires
- Head coach: Zach Peterson
- Ownership: Charlotte Hornets
- Affiliation: Charlotte Hornets
- Championships: 1 (2026)
- Conference titles: 1 (2026)
- Website: greensboro.gleague.nba.com

The Greensboro Swarm are an American professional basketball team of the NBA G League based in Greensboro, North Carolina. They are affiliated with the Charlotte Hornets, and play their home games at the Greensboro Coliseum Complex. The team became the eleventh Development League team to be owned by an NBA team when it was announced in 2015.

== History ==
In May 2015, the Charlotte Hornets announced that they planned to bring an NBA D-League team to the Carolinas in 2016. After considering several cities and arenas, the Hornets settled on Greensboro, North Carolina, with its home to be at the Pavilion at the Greensboro Coliseum Complex. On December 29, the name and logo of the Swarm was unveiled during an intermission between the women's and men's championship games of the 40th anniversary of HAECO Invitational presented by NewBridge Bank at the Greensboro Coliseum Complex Special Events Center and featured Charlotte Hornets players and executives, Hugo the Hornet, the Honey Bees (cheerleading for the Hornets), Swarm Squad, and special guests.

On July 25, 2016, the Charlotte Hornets hired Denver Nuggets assistant Noel Gillespie to be the head coach of the Swarm. After two seasons and no appearances in the playoffs, Gillespie's contract was not renewed and he was replaced by Joe Wolf. Hornets assistant coach Jay Hernandez was named the head coach of the Swarm for the abbreviated 2020–21 bubble season in Orlando. Hornets head video coordinator Jordan Surenkamp was then named the head coach for the 2021–22 season.

On August 3, 2023, Michael Jordan sold the majority stake in Hornets Sports & Entertainment (HSE) to a group led by Rick Schnall and Gabe Plotkin. HSE ownership includes the Charlotte Hornets and the Greensboro Swarm, as well as Hornets Venom GT (NBA 2K League) and managing/operating Spectrum Center.

Following Jordan Surenkamp's departure, Milwaukee Bucks assistant coach D.J. Bakker was hired as head coach of the Swarm on August 27, 2024. Bakker led the team to their first playoff appearance in 2025 and first championship in 2026. Following this success, Bakker accepted a position with the Orlando Magic in July 2026.

Zach Peterson was named head coach of the Swarm on September 1, 2026.

=== 2024–2025 season ===
The 2024-25 season was the most successful for the Swarm to date. Led by new head coach D.J. Bakker, the team recorded a 20-14 regular season record and finished 5th in the Eastern conference. On April 1, 2025 the Swarm lost to the Indiana Mad Ants in the first round of the playoffs with a final score of 110-120. This would mark the Greensboro Swarm's first winning season and first postseason appearance in franchise history.

Jaylen Sims became the Swarm's all-time leading scorer during the 2024–25 season with 2,216 points.

=== 2025–2026: First NBA G-League title ===
The Swarm posted a 10-4 record in the Tip-Off Tournament and clinched a berth in the Showcase Cup playoffs for the first time. They lost to the Grand Rapids Gold in the first round.On February 6, 2026, the Hornets waived KJ Simpson and signed Tosan Evbuomwan the same day. Tosan would go on to become the G league finals MVP later in the season.

They finished second in the Eastern conference for the 2025-26 season and recorded the best regular season record in franchise history with 24 wins and 12 losses. The Swarm went undefeated in the postseason and secured the G League championship on April 10, 2026, defeating the Stockton Kings in two games.

== Season-by-season results ==
Season	Division	Regular Season				Postseason	
Season	Division	Finish	Wins	Losses	Win %	Result	Score
Greensboro Swarm
2016–17	Atlantic	4th	19	31	.380	Did not qualify	
2017–18	Southeast	3rd	16	34	.320	Did not qualify	
2018–19	Southeast	3rd	24	26	.480	Did not qualify	
2019–20	Southeast	5th	9	34	.209	Season cancelled by COVID-19 pandemic	
2020–21	—	15th	5	10	.333	Did not qualify	
2021–22	Eastern	13th	9	24	.273	Did not qualify	
2022–23	Eastern	12th	11	21	.344	Did not qualify	
2023–24	Eastern	12th	15	19	.441	Did not qualify	
2024–25	Eastern	5th	20	14	.588	Lost First Round (Indiana)	110-120
2025–26	Eastern	2nd	24	12	.667	Won First Round (Maine)	112-90
2025–26	Eastern	2nd	24	12	.667	Won Semifinal (Capital City)	118-108
2025–26	Eastern	2nd	24	12	.667	Won Eastern Conference Finals (Osceola)	134-121
2025–26	Eastern	2nd	24	12	.667	Won Championship Finals (Stockton)	111-107
2025–26	Eastern	2nd	24	12	.667	Won Championship Finals (Stockton)	119-104
Regular season record			152	225	.403	2016-present	
Playoff record			5	1	.833	2016-present	

== Tip-Off Tournament ==
Season	Division	Finish	Wins	Losses	Win%	Showcase Cup Playoffs	
Season	Division	Finish	Wins	Losses	Win%	Result	Score
Greensboro Swarm
2021	South	8th	4	10	.286	Did not qualify	
2022	East	7th	7	11	.389	Did not qualify	
2023	East	7th	4	12	.250	Did not qualify	
2024	East	3rd	11	5	.688	Did not qualify	
2025	East	2nd	10	4	.714	Lost quarterfinal (Grand Rapids)	106-119
Tip-Off Tournament			36	42	.462	2021-present	
Showcase Cup playoffs			0	1	.000	2021-present	
Totals			36	43	.456	2021-present	

== Current roster ==
Greensboro Swarm roster
Players

Pos.	No.	Player	Height	Weight	DOB	From
C	5	PJ Hall (TW)	6 ft 8 in (2.03 m)	245 lb (111 kg)	2002-02-21	Clemson
G	10	DJ Rodman	6 ft 6 in (1.98 m)	215 lb (98 kg)	2001-04-25	USC
SG	13	Dereon Seabron	6 ft 5 in (1.96 m)	180 lb (82 kg)	2000-05-26	NC State
F	–	Michael Ajayi (TW)	6 ft 7 in (2.01 m)	235 lb (107 kg)	2003-05-23	Butler
G	–	Kylan Boswell (TW)	6 ft 2 in (1.88 m)	200 lb (91 kg)	2005-04-28	Illinois

Coaches
Head coach
- D.J. Bakker
Assistant(s)
- David Noel
- Nathan Peavy
- Alex Ruoff

Legend
- (DP) Unsigned draft pick
- (FA) Free agent
- (S) Suspended
- (P) Prospects
- (NBA) On assignment from NBA affiliate
- (TW) Two-way affiliate player
- Injured

Roster
Updated: March 4, 2026

== Head coaches ==
#	Head coach	Term	Regular season				Playoffs				Achievements
#	Head coach	Term	G	W	L	Win%	G	W	L	Win%	Achievements
1	Noel Gillespie	2016-2018	100	35	65	.350	—	—	—	—	
2	Joe Wolf	2018-2020	93	33	60	.355	—	—	—	—	
3	Jay Hernandez	2021	15	5	10	.333	—	—	—	—	
3	Jordan Surenkamp	2021-2024	99	35	64	.354	—	—	—	—	
4	D.J. Bakker	2024-2026	70	44	26	.629	6	5	1	.833	Eastern Conference Title (2026) NBA G League Championship (2026)
1	Zach Peterson	2026-present	0	0	0	–	—	—	—	—	

== NBA affiliates ==
- Charlotte Hornets (2016–present)
