= List of schools in the Roman Catholic Diocese of Jackson =

This is a list of schools in the Roman Catholic Diocese of Jackson.

== K-12 schools ==
- Cathedral School (Natchez)
- St. Joseph Catholic School (Greenville)
- Vicksburg Catholic School (including St. Francis Elementary School and St. Aloysius Middle/High School) (Vicksburg)

== 7-12 schools ==
- St. Joseph Catholic School (Madison)

== K-8 schools ==
- Annunciation Catholic Elementary School (Columbus)
- Holy Family Elementary School (Holly Springs)
- Sacred Heart Elementary School (Southaven)

Private:

- Sacred Heart Elementary School (Walls) (K-8) - Was previously listed as a school of the archdiocese.

== K-7 schools ==
- St. Patrick Elementary School (Meridian)

== Elementary schools ==
- Holy Child Jesus Elementary School (Canton)
- St. Alphonsus Elementary School (McComb)
- St. Anthony Elementary School (Madison)
- St. Elizabeth Elementary School (Clarksdale)
- St. Francis of Assisi Elementary School (Greenwood)
- St. Richard Catholic School (Jackson)
- St. Therese Elementary School (Jackson)
- Sister Thea Bowman Catholic School (Jackson)

== Early childhood schools ==
- St. Paul Early Learning Center (Flowood, formerly Brandon)
- St. Francis of Assisi Early Learning Center (Madison)
- Holy Family Early Learning Center (Natchez)

== Former schools ==
Former K-12 schools

- St. Gabriel Mission School (Mound Bayou) - Opened as a K-8 school on September 7, 1954. High school opened in 1958. In 1961 the high school closed. Its non-preschool grades ended in 1994.

Former elementary schools

- Our Lady of Lourdes Elementary School (Greenville) - Merged into St. Joseph in 2016
- Sacred Heart Elementary School (Camden)
- St. Mary Elementary School (Jackson) - Merged into Thea Bowman Elementary
- Holy Family Elementary School (Natchez)

Former preschools

- Christ the King Pre-School and Montessori (Jackson) - Merged into Bowman
- Immaculate Conception Early Childhood Center (Clarksdale)
- Saint Gabriel Early Childhood Center (Mound Bayou) - A building it used was converted to St. Gabriel Mercy Center in 1999. The early childhood center closed in 2001.

== See also ==
- Roman Catholic Diocese of Memphis, which operates the nearest high schools to portions of Mississippi that are suburbs of Memphis
