= Mother Mary Louis =

Mother Mary Louis Crummey
- Born: Mary Ann Crummey; 17 May 1848; Flushing, New York
- Died: 22 May 1932 (aged 84); St. Joseph's Convent Brentwood, NY
- Occupation(s): General Superior, Congregation of the Sisters of St. Joseph of Brentwood, NY

Mother Mary Louis, CSJ born Mary Ann Crummey (March 12, 1848 – May 22, 1932) was general superior of the Congregation of the Sisters of St. Joseph of Brentwood, New York, from 1892 to 1932. She was a driving force for education and healthcare in the City of New York as well as the counties of Long Island. She founded 32 elementary and secondary schools, two colleges, and two hospitals.

== Early life ==
Mary Ann Crummey was born in 1848 in the Village of Flushing in Queens County, New York. Upon the death of her mother in 1860, Mary Ann, along with her younger sister, Ellie, was entrusted to the care of the Congregation of the Sisters of St. Joseph at St. Joseph's Convent on Main Street and Kissena Blvd in Flushing. Mary Ann went on to attend the Academy of St. Joseph, the Sisters of St. Joseph's private boarding school then located on the grounds of their motherhouse in Flushing.

In 1867, at the age of 19, Mary Ann entered the Congregation of the Sisters of St. Joseph and was given the religious name of Sister Mary Louis. She was a gifted musician, singer and organist and served as the Congregation’s Directress of Music at the motherhouse. During her early years in the Congregation, she developed a deep and abiding passion for education, most especially the mission of providing young women with education like that she received when entrusted to the Congregation by her father.

== Leadership of her order ==
Sister Mary Louis was elected Superior General of her congregation in 1892. She was repeatedly re-elected to this position and served in this capacity for forty years.

She was a highly regarded woman of her time and worked closely with the male leaders of the Roman Catholic Diocese of Brooklyn and the Roman Catholic Archdiocese of New York including Bishop McDonnell, Archbishop Thomas Molloy and Cardinal Francis Spellman.

During her tenure as superior, the Sisters of St. Joseph enjoyed tremendous growth and achievement. When she took over the leadership of the Congregation in 1892, the number of sisters was at 300. At the time of her death forty years later, the Congregation had nearly quadrupled to more than 1,100.

In addition to increasing the number of vocations to her Congregation, Mother Mary Louis was directly responsible for the purchase and establishment of the Sisters of St. Joseph's Motherhouse in Brentwood, New York, in 1901. At this time, when women did not yet have the right to vote, it was unheard of for any female to transact any type of real estate deal, yet Mother Mary Louis personally surveyed, selected and negotiated the purchase of hundreds of acres of land in the Town of Brentwood. She also oversaw the development of the land as Motherhouse, College, Novitiate and Boarding School for Girls, while maintaining the existing Convent of St. Joseph in Flushing, Queens, which was now a part of the City of New York.

Under her direction, her order opened two hospitals in Queens: St. John's Hospital in Elmhurst and St. Joseph's Hospital in Rockaway Park, both staffed by the Sisters of St. Joseph. The sisters also staffed some 32 new elementary and secondary schools across four counties: Kings (Brooklyn), Queens, Nassau and Suffolk. She also established two colleges, St. Joseph's College for Women in Brooklyn in 1916 (Note: Renamed St. Joseph's College in 1970 and St. Joseph's University in 2022.) and Brentwood College in Suffolk County. (Note: Closed 1971, when its facilities became the Long Island campus of St. Joseph's College.)

== Death and legacy ==
Mother Mary Louis was felled by sudden illness in early April 1932, dying a month later on May 22, 1932, in the motherhouse she had established. She was interred in Calvary Cemetery in Brentwood, New York, the private cemetery she had established for the members of her order. The New York Times obituary of May 24, 1932, called her work "phenomenal".

In 1934 the Sisters of St. Joseph took up the project left unrealized when she died to build an academy for girls in Queens. At the urging of Archbishop Molloy, the Congregation named this new school The Mary Louis Academy. It held its first classes in a convent adjacent to the school construction site in September 1936 and the school building opened its doors for classes in October 1938.

In 2009, stretch of road lies in front of the Academy, Wexford Terrace between Edgerton Boulevard and Dalny Road in Jamaica Estates, Queens, was renamed Mother Mary Louis Way.
