= List of Catholic schools in Hong Kong =

This is a list of Catholic schools in Hong Kong, ordered by the operator. Some are operated by the Roman Catholic Diocese of Hong Kong. Others are operated by other religious orders or by Caritas.

== Diocesan ==
=== Diocesan secondary ===
- Cheung Sha Wan Catholic Secondary School
- Choi Hung Estate Catholic Secondary School
- Kwok Tak Seng Catholic Secondary School
- Kwun Tong Maryknoll College
- Lai King Catholic Secondary School
- Leung Shek Chee College
- Nam Wah Catholic Secondary School
- Newman Catholic College
- Ng Wah Catholic Secondary School
- Pui Shing Catholic Secondary School
- Raimondi College
- Shek Lei Catholic Secondary School
- Shun Lee Catholic Secondary School
- Shung Tak Catholic English College
- St Antonius Girls' College (聖安當女書院)
- St. Francis of Assisi's College
- St. Joan of Arc Secondary School
- St. Joseph's Anglo-Chinese School
- St. Peter's Secondary School
- St. Teresa Secondary School
- Sai Kung Sung Tsun Catholic School (Secondary Section) (西貢崇真天主教學校(中學部))
- Tuen Mun Catholic Secondary School
- Tung Chung Catholic School
- Valtorta College
- Yu Chun Keung Memorial College
- Yu Chun Keung Memorial College No. 2 (余振強紀念第二中學)
- Yuen Long Catholic Secondary School

=== Diocesan primary ===
- Aberdeen St. Peter’s Catholic Primary School
- Bishop Ford Memorial School
- Bishop Walsh Primary School
- Castle Peak Catholic Primary School
- Catholic Mission School
- Chai Wan Kok Catholic Primary School
- Cheung Chau Sacred Heart School
- Cho Yiu Catholic Primary School
- Choi Wan St. Joseph’s Primary School
- Father Cucchiara Memorial School
- Good Counsel Catholic Primary School
- Holy Family School
- Jordan Valley St. Joseph’s Catholic Primary School
- Kowloon Bay St. John The Baptist Catholic Primary School
- Kowloon Tong Bishop Walsh Catholic School
- Laichikok Catholic Primary School
- Lei Muk Shue Catholic Primary School
- Ling To Catholic Primary School
- The Little Flower’s Catholic Primary School
- Lok Wah Catholic Primary School
- Mary of Providence Primary School
- Meng Tak Catholic School
- Ng Wah Catholic Primary School
- Our Lady of China Catholic Primary School
- Pak Tin Catholic Primary School
- Ping Shek Estate Catholic Primary School
- Price Memorial Catholic Primary School
- Raimondi College Primary Section (Private)
- Sacred Heart of Mary Catholic Primary School
- Sai Kung Sung Tsun Catholic School (Primary Section)
- St. Andrew’s Catholic Primary School
- St. Charles School
- St. Edward’s Catholic Primary School
- St. Francis of Assisi’s Caritas School
- St. Francis of Assisi’s English Primary School (Private)
- St. John the Baptist Catholic Primary School
- St. Joseph’s Anglo-Chinese Primary School (Private)
- St. Patrick’s School
- St. Patrick’s Catholic Primary School (Po Kong Village Road)
- St. Peter’s Catholic Primary School
- Sau Mau Ping Catholic Primary School
- Shak Chung Shan Memorial Catholic Primary School
- Sham Tseng Catholic Primary School
- Shek Lei Catholic Primary School
- Shek Lei St. John’s Catholic Primary School
- Tai Kok Tsui Catholic Primary School
- Tai Kok Tsui Catholic Primary School (Hoi Fan Road)
- Tin Shui Wai Catholic Primary School
- Tsuen Wan Catholic Primary School
- Tsz Wan Shan Catholic Primary School
- Tung Chung Catholic School
- Wong Tai Sin Catholic Primary School
- Yan Tak Catholic Primary School
- Yaumati Catholic Primary School
- Yaumati Catholic Primary School (Hoi Wang Road)

=== Diocesan kindergartens ===
- Annunciation Catholic Kindergarten (天主教領報幼稚園)
- Cheung Chau Sacred Heart Kindergarten (長洲聖心幼稚園)
- Our Lady of Lourdes Catholic Kindergarten (天主教露德聖母幼稚園)
- Raimondi College Kindergarten Section (高主教書院幼稚園部)
- Star of the Sea Catholic Kindergarten & Star of the Sea Catholic Nursery (天主教海星幼稚園．幼兒園)
- St. Andrew’s Catholic Kindergarten (天主教聖安德肋幼稚園)
- St. James Catholic Kindergarten (天主教聖雅各伯幼稚園)
- St. Jerome’s Catholic Kindergarten (天主教聖葉理諾幼稚園)
- St. Margaret Mary’s Catholic Kindergarten (天主教聖瑪加利大幼稚園)
- St. Peter’s Catholic Kindergarten (天主教聖伯多祿幼稚園)
- St. Stephen’s Catholic Kindergarten (聖斯德望天主教幼稚園)
- St. Teresa’s Kindergarten (聖德蘭幼稚園)
- St. Thomas’ Catholic Kindergarten (天主教聖多默幼稚園)
- Tai Po Catholic Kindergarten (天主教大埔幼稚園)
- Tsuen Wan Our Lady Kindergarten (荃灣聖母幼稚園)
