= List of schools in the Roman Catholic Archdiocese of Atlanta =

This is a list of schools in the Roman Catholic Archdiocese of Atlanta.

== K-12 schools ==
- Holy Spirit Preparatory School, (Atlanta and Sandy Springs), Independent
- Notre Dame Academy, Duluth, Independent
- Pinecrest Academy, Cumming, Independent

== Secondary schools ==
7-12

- Donovan Catholic School, Athens, Independent
- Marist School, Brookhaven, Independent

High schools

- Blessed Trinity Catholic High School, Roswell
- Cristo Rey Atlanta Jesuit High School, Atlanta, Independent
- Our Lady of Mercy Catholic High School, Fayetteville
- St. Pius X Catholic High School, DeKalb County

== Elementary schools ==
- Christ the King School, Buckhead, Atlanta, Independent
- Holy Redeemer School, Johns Creek. The school's address may be stated as being in Alpharetta, but the school is outside of the Alpharetta city limits. The school opened in 1999.
- Immaculate Heart of Mary School, (North Druid Hills CDP. The school's address may be stated as being in Atlanta, but the school is outside of the Atlanta city limits. The school opened in 1958 with 238 students in grades 1-7, and a Middle School wing for grades 6-8 was built in 1969.
- Our Lady of the Assumption School, Brookhaven. The school's address may be stated as being in Atlanta, but the school is outside of the Atlanta city limits. The school opened in 1952 with 176 students, and current enrollment is approximately 580.
- Queen of Angels School, Roswell. The school opened in 1999.
- St. Catherine of Siena School, Kennesaw. The school opened in 2002, serving up to grade three, and opened one grade each subsequent year until grade eight in 2007.
- St. John Neumann Regional School, Lilburn. The school has a Lilburn address, but is outside the Lilburn city limits. It opened in 1986 with 160 students, and current enrollment is about 350 students.
- St. John the Evangelist School, Hapeville. The school opened in 1954.
- St. Joseph School, Athens. The school opened in 1949.
- St. Joseph School, Marietta. The school opened in 1953.
- St. Jude the Apostle School, Sandy Springs. The school's address may be stated as being in Atlanta, but the school is outside of the Atlanta city limits. The school opened in 1962.
- St. Mary School, Rome. The school opened in 1945, and the current building opened in 2001.
- St. Peter Claver Regional School, (Candler-McAfee CDP unincorporated DeKalb County, near Decatur). The school opened in 1961 and became a regional school in 2001.
- St. Thomas More School, Decatur. The school opened in 1950.

== Former schools ==
High schools

- Sacred Heart High School, Atlanta. The school merged into St. Pius X in 1958.
- Sophia Academy, Chamblee. The school was founded in 1999 and merged into Notre Dame Academy in 2017.

Grade schools

- Our Lady Of Lourdes School, Atlanta. The school was open from 1912 to 2001.
- Our Lady of Victory School, Tyrone. The school was open from 1999 to 2022.
- Sacred Heart Grammar School, Atlanta Established in 1909.
- Saint Anthony of Padua School, West End, Atlanta. The school was open from 1912 to 2001.
- Sacred Heart School in Griffin, Ga. Grades 1-8. Opened from October 1946-1973. Source.
