= List of schools in the Roman Catholic Diocese of Providence =

This is a list of schools in the Roman Catholic Diocese of Providence.

== PreK-12 schools ==
- St. Mary Academy – Bay View, East Providence - Girls only

== 6-12 schools ==
- Mount Saint Charles Academy, Woonsocket
- Overbrook Academy (Greenville) - Grades 6–11, only for girls

== High schools ==
- Bishop Hendricken High School, Warwick
- Chesterton Academy of Our Lady of Hope, Warwick
- La Salle Academy, Providence
- Portsmouth Abbey School, Portsmouth
- Prout School, South Kingstown
- St. Patrick Academy, Providence
- St. Raphael Academy, Pawtucket

== Grade schools ==
Grades are Pre-Kindergarten through 8 unless otherwise specified.

- All Saints STEAM Academy (Middletown)
- Bishop McVinney Regional School (Providence)
- Blessed Sacrament School (Providence)
- Fr. John V. Doyle School (Coventry)
- Greater Woonsocket Catholic Regional School System (Woonsocket)
  - Good Shepherd Catholic Regional School - Grades 3-8
  - Msgr. Gadoury Primary Regional School
  - The system was established in 1972, incorporating Holy Family Junior High School, Monsignor Gadoury Elementary School, Our Lady of Victories Elementary School, Sacred Heart Elementary School, St. Ann Elementary School, and St. Joseph Elementary School. At some point the system closed the Holy Family, Sacred Heart, and St. Ann campuses. The system was renamed Northwest Catholic Regional School in 1977 after four parishes joined the school system. In 1993 Fr. Holland Elementary School became a part of the system. The Holland building closed in 2008. In November 2019 the Good Shepherd and Monsignor Gadoury schools are to combine into a single building, meaning that one building will remain in the system.
- Immaculate Conception Catholic Regional School (Cranston)
- DeLaSalle Middle School (Providence) - Grades 6-8
- Mercymount Country Day School, (Cumberland)
- Msgr. Matthew F. Clarke Catholic Reg. School (Wakefield)
- Our Lady of Mercy Regional School (East Greenwich)
- Our Lady of Mt. Carmel School (Bristol)
- Sacred Heart School (East Providence) - K-8
- St. Augustine School (Providence)
- St. Cecilia School (Pawtucket)
- St. Joseph School (West Warwick)
- St. Kevin School (Warwick)
- St. Luke School (Barrington)
- St. Margaret School (East Providence) - PreKindergarten through grade 5
- St. Mary School (Cranston)
- St. Paul School (Cranston)
- St. Peter Tri-Parish School (Warwick)
- St. Philip School (Smithfield)
- St. Philomena School (Portsmouth)
- St. Pius V School (Providence) - PreK3-8
- St. Rocco School (Johnston)
- St. Rose of Lima School (Warwick)
- St. Teresa School (Pawtucket)
- St. Thomas Regional STEAM Academy (Providence)

== Former schools ==
- Bishop Keough Regional High School (closed) - Girls only
- St. Joseph of Cluny School was formerly located in Newport, on property given by the estate of Arthur Curtiss James to the Roman Catholic Diocese of Providence in 1941. Military families from Fort Adams requested a Catholic school; Cluny opened in September 1957 as a kindergarten and added grades until 1965, when the first eighth grade graduation was held. Since the period, the overall population of Newport declined and the concentration of the middle class declined; much of the housing became too expensive for families with young children, and there were relatively few houses being sold in Newport to new residents. In addition many families previously going to Cluny instead sent their children to the Portsmouth School Department. From circa 2014 to 2017 the enrollment decreased by one fourth; the school administration stated that this decline and the general competition among private schools in the Newport area caused the operation of the school to be no longer viable. It closed in 2017. Betsy Sherman Walker of Newport This Week described the closure as a "curveball" unexpected by the community.
