= List of schools in the Roman Catholic Archdiocese of Hartford =

This is a list of schools in the Roman Catholic Archdiocese of Hartford.

== High schools ==
High schools

- Academy of Our Lady of Mercy, Lauralton Hall, Milford
- Canterbury School, New Milford
- East Catholic High School, Manchester
- Holy Cross High School, Waterbury
- Northwest Catholic High School, West Hartford
- Notre Dame High School, West Haven
- Sacred Heart Academy, Hamden
- Sacred Heart High School, Waterbury
- St. Paul Catholic High School, Bristol

== Elementary schools ==
The following is a list of the currently functioning elementary and middle schools run by the Archdiocese of Hartford. All information was gathered from the records of the Archdiocese's Office of Catholic Schools.

Valerie Mara, Superintendent of Catholic Schools

Name	Town
St. Aedan-St. Brendan School	New Haven
Assumption School	Ansonia
Assumption School	Manchester
St. Bernadette School	New Haven
St. Bernard School	Enfield
Blessed Sacrament Catholic Day School	Waterbury
St. Bridget School	Cheshire
St. Bridget School	Manchester
St. Christopher School	East Hartford
Corpus Christi School	Wethersfield
St. Dominic School	Southington
Enfield Montessori School	Enfield
St. Francis-St. Hedwig School	Naugatuck
St. Francis-St. Rose of Lima School	New Haven
St. Gabriel School	Milford
St. Gabriel School	Windsor
Holy Trinity	Wallingford
St. James School	Manchester
St. John the Evangelist School	Watertown
St. Joseph School	Bristol
St. Joseph School	Meriden
St. Lawrence Elementary School	West Haven
Little Angels Preschool Program	Enfield
St. Martha School	Enfield
St. Martin de Porres Academy	New Haven
St. Mary School	Branford
St. Mary School	Milford
St. Mary School	Newington
St. Mary School	Simsbury
St. Mary School	Waterbury
St. Mary Magdalen School	Oakville (Watertown)
St. Mary-St. Michael School	Derby
St. Matthew School	Forestville (Bristol)
Our Lady of Mercy School	Madison
Our Lady of Mt. Carmel School	Meriden
Our Lady of Mt. Carmel School	Waterbury
Our Lady of Victory School	West Haven
St. Paul School	Kensington (Berlin)
St. John Paul the Great Academy	Torrington
SS. Peter and Paul School	Waterbury
Pope John Paul II School	New Britain
St. Rita School	Hamden
Sacred Heart School	New Britain
St. Stanislaus School	Meriden
St. Stephen School	Hamden
St. Thomas School	Southington
St. Thomas the Apostle School	West Hartford
St. Timothy Middle School	West Hartford

== Former schools ==
St. Gabriel's School in Milford opened in 1965; at the time clergy were the primary teachers. By the 2010s there were fewer clergy teachers, and lay teachers were more expensive; in addition fewer parishioners gave money to the church. By 2016 the school's budget was $111,709 in deficit. In 2008-2009 it had a peak enrollment of 219. In 2014 there was concern expressed about the school's survival expressed in the community, and in 2016 enrollment was down to 139, with 22 being in special education. The school directors chose to close the school in June 2016; the archdiocese did not order the closure.

St. Anthony School in Bristol closed in 2016.

St. Vincent de Paul School in East Haven closed in 2016. That year enrollment was 89.

St. Anthony School was in Winsted, Winchester. It opened in 1865. Circa 2008 it had about 200 students. By 2020 this figure declined to 90. It closed in 2020. At the time it was the oldest school continually operated by the archdiocese.

Sts. Cyril and Methodius School in Hartford closed in 2014. St. Augustine School in Hartford closed in 2016 and merged into a partnership school St. Brigid-St. Augustine. However, that partnership school closed in 2020.
