= Sacred Heart Academy (Hempstead, New York) =

Location
- 47 Cathedral Avenue; Hempstead; Hempstead, (Nassau County), New York 11550; United States
- 40°42′26″N 73°38′3″W

Information
- Type: Private All-Female
- Motto: "Lead with Heart" (having compassion and empathy for the people you lead)
- Religious affiliations: Roman Catholic; Sisters of St. Joseph
- Patron saint: Sparta
- Established: 1949
- Principal: Maria Hecht
- Grades: 9-12
- Average class size: 200-250 per year, variable
- Student to teacher ratio: 13:1
- Campus size: Small
- Colors: Red and Gold
- Slogan: "Lead With Heart"
- Athletics conference: CHSAA
- Mascot: Lady Spartan
- Nickname: SHA
- Team name: Lady Spartans
- Rivals: Kellenberg Memorial High School, The Mary Louis Academy, St. Anthony's High School (South Huntington, New York)
- Accreditation: Middle States Association of Colleges and Schools
- Publication: Concordia (literary magazine)(now defunct)
- Newspaper: Cordette
- Yearbook: Ex-Corde
- Website: sacredheartacademyli.org

Sacred Heart Academy is an all-girls preparatory school located on Cathedral Avenue, in Hempstead, New York, United States. It is private and Catholic. Located within the Roman Catholic Diocese of Rockville Centre, it is run by the Sisters of Saint Joseph. Sacred Heart Academy is a single-sex school for girls, grades 9 to 12. The official school colors of Sacred Heart are red and gold.

== History ==
Sacred Heart Academy was established in 1949 by the Sisters of St. Joseph of Brentwood.

== Activities ==
Students can participate in musical theatre, performances of The Nutcracker, band, orchestra, and two types of chorus, as well as dozens of clubs. Most students participate in Red and Gold as well.

== Notable alumnae ==
- Katherine Lapp, 1974, Executive Vice President and Chief Administrative Officer of Harvard University
- Alice McDermott, 1971, Author
