= The Mary Louis Academy =

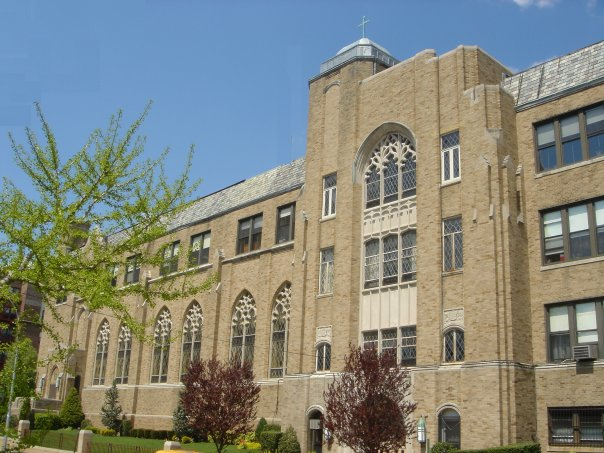

Location
- 176-21 Wexford Terrace; Mother Mary Louis Way; 76-21 Wexford Terrace Mother Mary Louis Way Jamaica Estates, Queens, New York 11432 United States (Jamaica Estates, Queens), New York 11432; United States; 40°42′45″N 73°47′15″W

Information
- Type: Private, Day, College-prep
- Motto: Fidem Servavi (I Have Kept the Faith)
- Religious affiliations: Roman Catholic (Sisters of St. Joseph)
- Patron saints: Louis IX of France; Blessed Mother
- Established: 1936
- Founder: Mother Mary Louis
- School district: Roman Catholic Diocese of Brooklyn
- School code: 016
- CEEB code: 332430
- President: Livia Angiolillo
- Dean: Laura Matelsky Antzoulis; Dean of Freshwomen and Juniors; Sylwia Schober; Dean of Sophomores and Seniors
- Principal: Mrs. Jean Mauro
- Faculty: approx 100
- Grades: 9-12 Middle school launching academic year 2025-2026
- Gender: Girls
- Average class size: 25
- Student to teacher ratio: 12:1
- Education system: New York State Education Department (NYSED) curriculum American education system with a college-preparatory curriculum
- Campus: Butterfly Garden; Marian Shrine; Ecology Garden; Art Cottage
- Campus size: 5 acres (20,000 m^{2})
- Campus type: Suburban
- Colors: Columbia Blue and Gold
- Slogan: TMLA+
- Song: "Crusaders"
- Athletics: Fall Sports: Soccer Tennis Volleyball Cross Country Winter Sports: Basketball Indoor Track & Field Swimming Cheerleading Spring Sports: Softball Lacrosse Outdoor Track & Field Golf
- Athletics conference: CHSAA
- Sports: Basketball Softball Soccer Volleyball Track & Field Cross Country Tennis Lacrosse
- Mascot: Penguin
- Nickname: Mary Louis / TMLA
- Team name: Hilltoppers
- Accreditation: Middle States Association of Colleges and Schools
- National ranking: 104th among Best All-Girls High Schools in America 197th among Best Catholic High Schools in America 605th among Most Diverse Private High Schools in America
- Publication: "Spring" (literary magazine)
- Newspaper: Mariel
- Yearbook: Crusader
- School fees: For new students: $450. For sophomores, juniors, and seniors: $600. Additional graduation fee for seniors: $325.
- Tuition: $11,500
- Affiliation: Sponsorship: TMLA is one of four all-girls high schools sponsored by the Sisters of Saint Joseph, Brentwood. Memberships: The academy holds memberships in the National Catholic Educational Association (NCEA) and other special emphasis associations.
- Alumni: Over 20,000
- Alumnae Magazine: Mariel-After
- CSJ Sister Schools: Sacred Heart Academy (New York); Fontbonne Hall Academy; Academia Maria Reina
- Affiliated colleges: Columbia University; St. John's University (New York); Saint Joseph's College (New York)
- Website: www.tmla.org

The Mary Louis Academy (TMLA) is an all-girls private Catholic college-preparatory academy located in Jamaica Estates, Queens, New York City. TMLA's 5-acre (20,000 m^{2}) campus encompasses eight buildings situated on private grounds at the top of one of the highest hills in Queens, hence TMLA's interscholastic nickname, "The Hilltoppers".

The Mary Louis Academy was founded in 1936 by the Congregation of the Sisters of St. Joseph of Brentwood, New York, fulfilling their late General Superior, Mother Mary Louis', dream to found an academy for young women in Queens. Archbishop Thomas Edmund Molloy had a hand in the birth of TMLA due to his conviction that the girls of the Diocese of Brooklyn deserved an academy of their own.

The Mary Louis Academy is chartered by the University of the State of New York, accredited by the Middle States Association of Colleges and Schools, and sponsored by the Congregation of the Sisters of St. Joseph.

== History ==
=== Construction ===
While traveling on the Long Island Rail Road in early 1932, Mother Mary Louis, the General Superior of the Sisters of St. Joseph, selected the hilltop, the Fox/Adikes estate "Rose Crest," in the countryside of Jamaica Estates as her site for an academy; however, Mother Mary Louis died on May 22, 1932. Later, the hilltop was purchased by the Passionist priests of the neighboring Immaculate Conception Monastery with the intent to build a high school seminary for boys at that location. Archbishop Thomas Molloy intervened and convinced the Passionists to sell the estate to the Josephites for exactly the same price they had paid for it themselves.

In 1935, the Sisters of St. Joseph officially acquired the Rose Crest estate, and the Mediterranean Revival white stucco mansion became the convent for the Sisters. Mother Mary Louis had intended the nascent academy to be named Mother Fontbonne Academy, in memory of Jeanne Fontbonne, the foundress of the Sisters of St. Joseph in Le Puy, France. Archbishop Molloy suggested that the Academy be named in memory of Mother Mary Louis herself. Sister Mary Angelica Clarkin CSJ, Ph.D., the founding principal, applied to the New York Department of Education for the official Academy charter in the name "Mother Mary Louis Academy." When the charter was delivered, it arrived with the first two letters, as well as the last, in the word "Mother," missing; thus, the word "The" was permanently affixed to the name of The Mary Louis Academy.

The architect of the academy's building, Henry Murphy, stated that he wanted to evoke the feel of the private prep schools found in New England. Murphy proceeded to model the building after the Sterling Law Building at Yale University. The building was built over a period of two years and finally opened its doors on October 16, 1938. The Collegiate Gothic, was known as the main building. James Nelson, the builder of TMLA, celebrated the birth of his daughter during the building's construction by naming her for the Academy. Nelson subsequently registered his daughter as TMLA's first prospective student. Mary Louis Nelson went on to graduate from TMLA in 1955.

=== Enrollment ===
The first students were fifteen young women who were greeted by a faculty of eight sisters for the first day of school on September 14, 1936. Classes were held in the parlor of the mansion that presently adjoins the Academy (now known as The Mary Louis Convent), while plans for the permanent Academy building were formulated. During this time, two wings were also added to the mansion, housing a refectory and a Mission style chapel. In 1938, TMLA also opened the doors to The Mary Louis Kindergarten, a one-year preschool program for 5-year-old girls and boys. The kindergarten was housed in a cottage adjacent to the convent and later moved to Immaculata Hall, one of the larger cottages on the academy's campus (the present-day Formation Cottage). Many of the female graduates of The Mary Louis Kindergarten, including Mary Louis Nelson, went on to graduate from TMLA itself.

Mariel, the school newspaper, published its first issue in 1936. The Christmas Pageant, sponsored by the Sodality, became an annual event. Spirit Night also became an annual tradition. In 1940, the first Commencement Exercises of The Mary Louis Academy, with the introduction of the C.L.S. Award, were done.

=== Renovations and expansions ===
In 1955, work began on an extension, initially to be named DeChantal Wing, later known simply as "The Wing." When the wing was opened in 1957, the maximum capacity of the academy was effectively doubled. The original cafeteria, DeChantal Hall, was redesigned into a seven-room music complex; the original locker room became the ten-room guidance complex; the reception parlor became the general office; and a laboratory, a cafeteria, a locker room, and several classrooms were introduced. The construction brought a third wing to the convent.

During the 1960s and 1970s, the academy's building layout and curriculum were overhauled in response to the revision of the secondary school curriculum by the New York Department of Education. Student resource centers were established, an art studio (the Art Cottage) was constructed on the campus, and the library was expanded. In the 1970s, The Mary Louis Kindergarten was closed in deference to the neighboring Immaculate Conception Elementary School opening a kindergarten program of its own. In the 1980s, a computer science class was made available, and a computer room was opened accordingly. The academy applied for and was granted accreditation by the Middle States Association of Colleges and Schools. The boardroom was renovated and consecrated. In the 1990s, two computer laboratories were created, and the school's laboratories were modernized.

In the early 2000s, the auditorium was retooled with restored lighting, a refurbished stage, updated flooring, cushioned seats, and air conditioning. The main staircase, constructed in 1937, underwent a restoration, and the general office was restored to its 1938 floor plan. Home Economics was removed from the New York State Regent's curriculum and, as such, was subsequently removed from the academy's curriculum. The now-defunct Home Economics Complex was repurposed into three additional classrooms. In 2004, TMLA renovated the adjacent wing of the convent. This expansion built new classrooms as well as academic and counseling offices.

In 2011, the number of Sisters residing in The Mary Louis Convent had diminished; as a result, the remaining Sisters relocated to neighboring convents, and the Convent building was turned over to TMLA. In the summer of 2014, TMLA renovated the former Convent Building (the original Rose Crest Mansion). This expansion and renovation added over 12,500 square feet to the academy's facilities, including a student lounge, art solarium, robotics/engineering laboratory, mathematics laboratory, culinary arts center, an 11-bedroom overnight student retreat facility, and a return to the original mission-style chapel.

At the recommendation of the New York City Council, the Office of Mayor Michael Bloomberg approved the naming of Wexford Terrace between Edgerton Boulevard and Dalny Road, Mother Mary Louis Way, in honor of Mother Mary Louis Crummey CSJ, founder and namesake of The Mary Louis Academy. The 18-month-long process culminated with a televised dedication ceremony on May 1, 2009.

== Services ==
Overnight retreats are available to students at St. Joseph's Villa, the CSJ beachfront estate in the Hamptons. Annual full-day retreats for each grade level at St. Joseph's Renewal Center. There are two full Chapels on campus. Mass is offered every day in TMLA's Chapels.

Juniors each contribute 50 hours of volunteer service to a program they select that provides help to individuals in need. There are also Service Homerooms where students volunteer to plan and carry out events and service projects.

== Athletics ==
The Mary Louis Academy TMLA sponsors athletic teams in 13 separate areas of interest, including Badminton, Basketball, Bowling, Cheerleading, Dance, Golf, Lacrosse, Soccer, Softball, Swimming, Tennis, Track, and Volleyball. TMLA has been afforded membership in two athletic conferences: the Brooklyn/Queens CHSAA and the Nassau/Suffolk CHSAA.

== Alumnae ==
- Alice Adams – sculptor, Fulbright Program and Guggenheim Fellowship winner
- Patricia Fili-Krushel – past president, ABC Television Network, Retired Chairman – NBCUniversal Television Group
- Patricia Reilly Giff – children's author, Newbery Medal winner
- Marianne Githens, Ph.D., Distinguished Professor of Political Science – Goucher College
- Mary Gordon, Official New York State Author 2008–2010, McIntosh Professor of English at Barnard College
- Marilyn Hanold Neilson – screen actress, and fashion model, Twentieth Century Fox
- Patricia Hynes – past president, New York City Bar Association
- Lauren LoGiudice – stage and television actress
- Pascale Sablan – architect
- Myra Turley – film and television actress
- Jude Watson (Judy Blundell) – author
