= St. Edmund Preparatory High School =

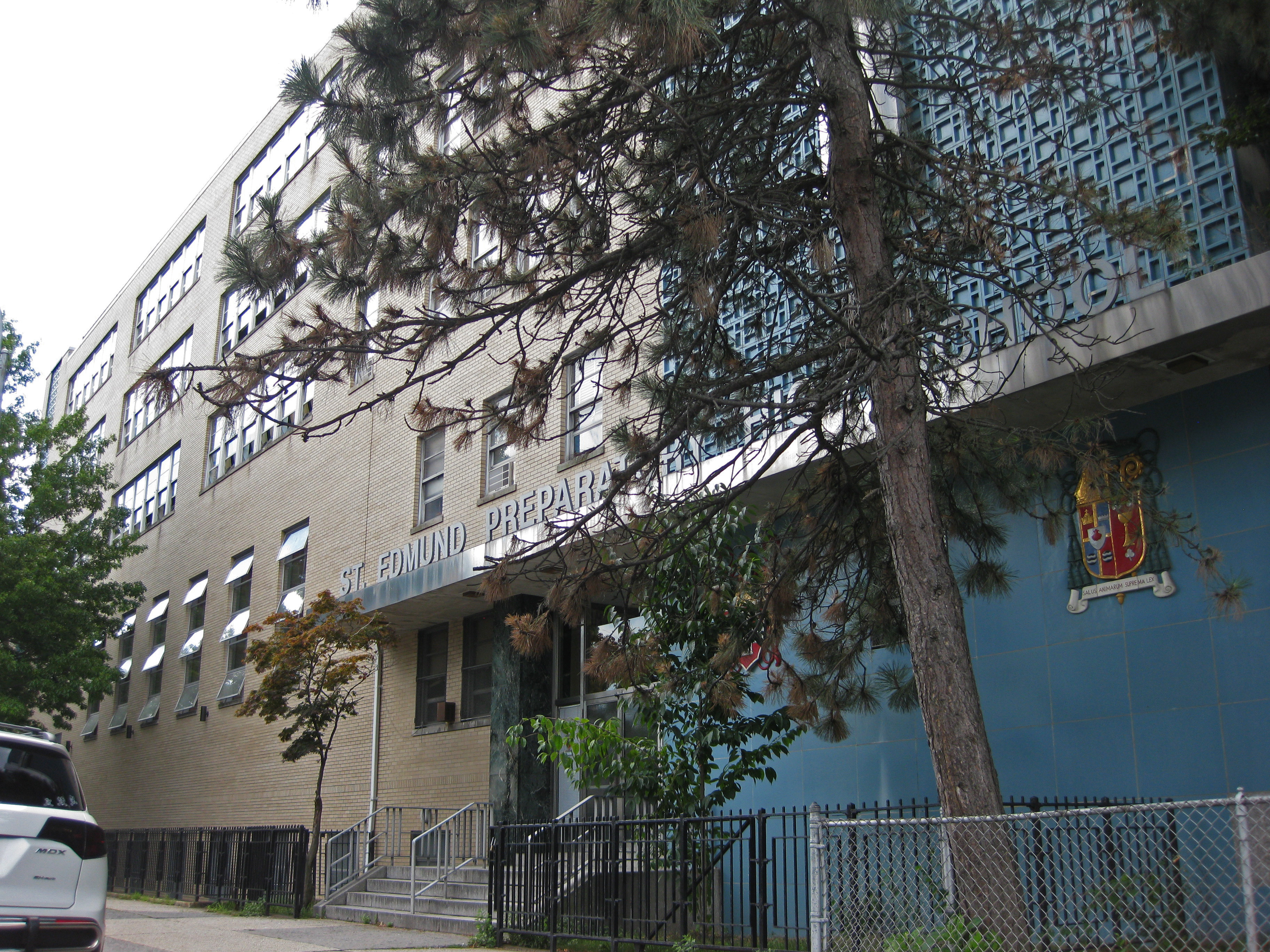

Location
- 2474 Ocean Avenue; Homecrest, Brooklyn; New York City, New York 11229; United States; 40°36′4″N 73°57′7″W

Information
- Former names: St. Edmund Academy (1932–1936); St. Edmund Commercial High School (1936–1962); St. Edmund High School (1962–1994)
- Type: Private, Coeducational
- Religious affiliation: Roman Catholic
- Patron saint: St. Edmund of Canterbury
- Established: 1932; 94 years ago
- School code: 008
- Principal: Allison McGinnis
- Grades: 9-12
- Student to teacher ratio: 17:1
- Colors: Purple and White
- Athletics conference: CHSAA
Sports
Baseball Softball Basketball Volleyball Lacrosse Hockey Soccer	Handball Cheerleading Golf; Swimming Track; Tennis
- Mascot: Eagle
- Team name: Eagles
- Accreditation: Middle States Association of Colleges and Schools
- Publication: The Equinox (Literary Magazine)
- Newspaper: Edmund Eagle
- Yearbook: Canterburian
- School fees: $500 enrollment fee
- Tuition: $10,375/year
- Website: www.stedmundprep.org

St. Edmund Preparatory High School, also referred to by its acronym SEP is commonly known as St. Edmund Prep. It is a private Roman Catholic high school in Brooklyn, New York and it is located within the Roman Catholic Diocese of Brooklyn.

== History ==
St. Edmund Preparatory High School was established in 1932 as a two-year commercial high school. It became a four-year high school in 1962. In 2007, the school was accepted into the International Baccalaureate Organization (IBO) and had begun IB classes as of fall of 2008. The school now also offers AP (Advanced Placement) classes which allows students to potentially earn college credits. Allison McGinnis is currently the principal and Peggy McEvoy is the current Assistant Principal. In 2008 the school added a new wing that includes a media center and performing arts room.

St. Edmund Parish has sponsored a high school since the Great Depression. The school opened on February 2, 1932 as St. Edmund Academy, a two-year high school for girls, with a class of sixty students. In 1936 it became St. Edmund Commercial High School, offering a two-year commercial program. It became a four-year high school in 1962 and was re-titled St. Edmund High School, accredited by Middle States.

From 1932 to 1962, classes were held the building which now houses the grammar school and church. On June 12, 1960 ground was broken for a new high school building and the dedication ceremony for the new high school took place on May 20, 1962. The new school building opened in September 1962 and graduated its first class of 232 graduates in June 1964.

In September 1994 the school was again renamed as St. Edmund Preparatory High School and became an independent entity run by a board of trustees. At this time, the school became a co-educational institution dedicated to preparing boys and girls for entrance to college. Bishop Thomas V. Daily approved the change after consultation with Monsignor Vincent D. Breen, Superintendent of Catholic Education, and Monsignor Thomas F. Noonan, a former pastor of St. Edmund Church. The proposal to enroll boys was made to the Bishop in response to an increasing number of inquiries in recent years from parents who sought a Catholic High School to serve boys from parishes in South Brooklyn.

From its opening in 1932, the administration of the school was in the very capable hands of the Dominican Sisters of the Congregation of Our Lady of the Rosary of Sparkill, New York. However, in 1986, as the number of Dominican teaching faculty decreased, the administration of the school was turned over to the equally capable hands of the Congregation of The Sisters of Saint Joseph. In 1996 John Lorenzetti was named as the first lay principal of St. Edmund's and was assisted by Sr. Barbara Doyle C.S.J. as Assistant Principal.

In September 1999 Sister Barbara was appointed Campus Minister and James Benson was appointed as the first lay Assistant Principal. Due to increasing student population, Tom Maher and Ray Malafronte were appointed Academic Deans. In September 2005, Allison McGinnis was appointed as the school's second lay Assistant Principal.

On February 14, 2007, St. Edmund Prep took a step towards expanding its building with a groundbreaking ceremony for the new Library & Media Center Wing. Bishop Nicholas DiMarzio presided over the ceremony. On January 31, 2008, the final piece of steel was put into place, completing the building's basic shell. A topping-off ceremony was held, where members of the St. Edmund Community signed the beam that would be hoisted into place. Auxiliary Bishop Frank Caggiano presided over the ceremony. The new wing was officially dedicated on the Feast of St. Edmund of Canterbury, November 16, 2008. Bishop Nicholas DiMarzio presided over the Mass of Thanksgiving and Dedication Ceremony.

The school today is largely staffed by lay faculty, with some diocesan deacons and priests and a member of the Oratory of St. Philip Neri.
