= Our Lady of Mercy Academy (New York) =

Location
- Permanently Closed; Syosset, Nassau County, New York 11791; United States; 40°49′22″N 73°29′.38″W

Information
- Type: Independent All-Girl
- Motto: Fides, Mores, Cultura (Fidelity to principle, Moral integrity, Enrichment of life)
- Religious affiliation: Roman Catholic
- Established: 1928
- School district: Syosset School District
- Oversight: Sisters of Mercy of the Americas
- CEEB code: 335440
- NCES School ID: 00930411
- Grades: 9-12
- Enrollment: 200 (September 2023)
- Campus size: 96 acres
- Campus type: Suburban
- Colors: Blue and white
- Athletics: All
- Athletics conference: Nassau/Suffolk Catholic High School Girls Athletic Association
- Mascot: Mustangs
- Team name: Lady Mustangs
- Accreditation: Middle States Association of Colleges and Schools
- Publication: Windows (literary magazine)
- Yearbook: The Tower
- School fees: $650 new entrants
- Tuition: $15,275 (2023-2024)
- Affiliation: Mercy Education Association
- Website: www.olma.org

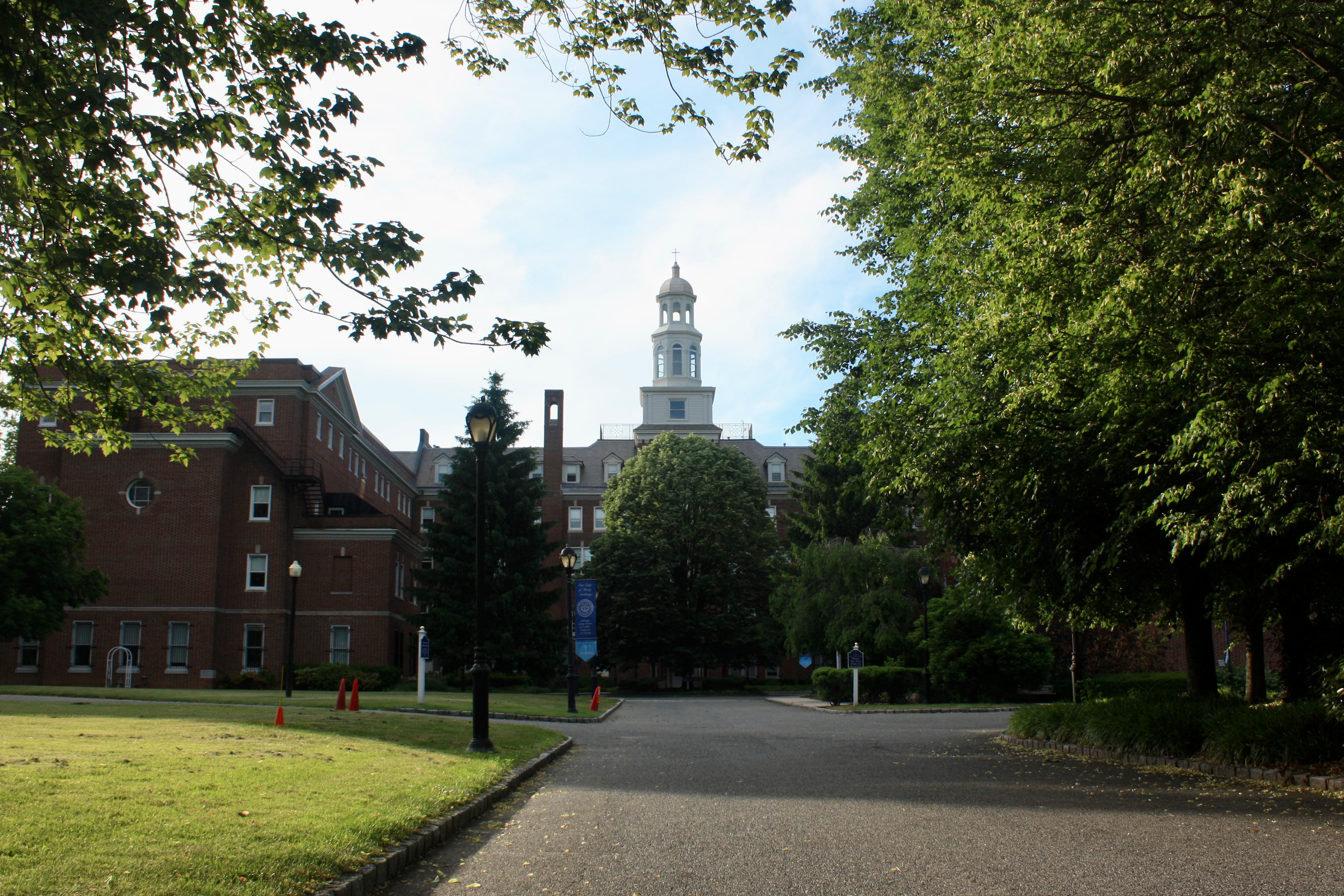
Our Lady of Mercy Academy building featuring the colonial tower, as seen from Convent Road

Our Lady of Mercy Academy, also referred to as OLMA, was a private Catholic College preparatory school for young women, founded in 1928 in Syosset, NY. The academy was governed by a board of directors and it was operated by the Sisters of Mercy. Our Lady of Mercy Academy permanently closed in August 2024.

Our Lady of Mercy Academy is chartered by the Board of Regents of the State of New York, is accredited by the Middle States Association Commissions on Elementary and Secondary Schools and is a member of the Mercy Secondary Education Association and the National Catholic Education Association.

There are over 30 extracurricular activities, including a sports program. There are tennis courts, a soccer field, 2 softball fields, and a gymnasium. In addition to a president and a principal there is an assistant principal, a director of curriculum and supervision, a director of technology, a director of mission effectiveness, and a director of athletics.

== History ==
In the fall of 1928, 11 students were enrolled in Our Lady of Mercy Academy, originally created as a boarding school for young women. By the end of the year, there would be 30 students comprising the 8th and 9th grades. The fourth-floor of the building housed the Sisters of Mercy novitiate, housing young women studying to become nuns.

Although the academy was built as a boarding school, it always made room for day students who were few in those early days. The school started accepting day students in the 1940s.

World War II brought difficult times to the academy. The school was involved in food stamps, rationing, victory gardens, air raid drills, and two hours of weekly instruction in First Aid. A few English students were sent to escape the bombing in Europe. Students could watch the young aviators training from local airfields, since the academy tower was used as a turning point for them, and they thrilled the students by tipping their plane wings in greeting.

The years after the war saw a tremendous growth in curriculum enrichment and parent participation. A PTA was established in 1948. By 1964, with increased population growth on Long Island, it became obvious that there was not so much a need for a boarding school. Dormitories were converted into classrooms, and dining rooms into cafeterias. The parlors still remain for meeting parents and guests, and providing meetings for special events. The school's enrollment peaked in the 1970s with about 525 students. With tremendous support from parents and friends, OLMA was able to build a new gym in 1978.

Curriculum has been enriched in art, dance, music and theatre. Advanced placement courses, college affiliation classes, computer labs, Internet access, on-line databases and a completely automated library media center, all indicate that OLMA has progressed from those early 20th century years with 11 students, 5 faculty and a Regents approved curriculum for the times, to the threshold of the 21st century with 500 students, 69 faculty and staff, and a curriculum providing access to all colleges and professions, and preparing women with a Catholic, value-centered future.

In January 2024, it was announced the school would be closing after the 2023/2024 school year due to low enrollment. The OLMA Preservation Coalition was formed to explore ways through which to save the school. However, a letter to families indicated the decision to close is final and circumstances to change the decision would not be entertained.

== Buildings and grounds ==
In 1927, the Sisters of Mercy of Brooklyn began plans for building a boarding school in Syosset. Its location in the Town of Oyster Bay, the cornerstone of colonial settlement of the north shore, suggested that the building be colonial in structure. In keeping with these early roots, the sisters envisioned a Georgian structure whose main entrance on Syosset-Woodbury Road would be enhanced by a tall-pillared portico with graceful Doric columns. Georgian influence would be seen in paneling, lighting fixtures and windows.

The distinguishing feature of the building is the colonial tower rising 117 feet and patterned after Independence Hall in Philadelphia.

Our Lady of Mercy Academy covers 96 acres including wide, rolling natural spaces. The grounds support the Athletic Department for softball, tennis, soccer, lacrosse, and track. The Science and Art Departments use the grounds for extended classroom instruction and experimentation, including our Arbor Day ceremony of planting memorial trees.

In August 2016, a new gazebo was built as a Troop 71 Eagle Scout service project; the new gazebo replaced one that had become unusable over time.

By 2018, Our Lady of Mercy Academy had undergone $2.5 million in upgrades and additions over four years, including a new technology center, student study center, and improvements to the science labs and softball field.

In July 2021, the Our Lady of Mercy Academy gymnasium floor was named in honor of Karen Andreone, who spent 33 years at the school in roles including athletic director, physical education teacher, and coach for volleyball, badminton, and softball.

== Academics ==
Programs for students are planned to meet and exceed the requirements of the New York State Education Department. New York State Regents diplomas are issued to graduates who fulfill the Academy's graduation requirements, which encompass and surpass the requirement of the State of New York.

- The academic curriculum includes an Honors program and Advanced Placement courses.
- Accredited college courses offered through dual-enrollment programs with St. John's University.
- Advanced Placement courses are offered in accordance with the curriculum and requirements of the College Board.
- All freshmen are required to take half a year of dance and half a year of physical education, as well as music, computer technology, and regular subjects (Intro to Genre, World History, Math, science, and a language).
- The languages offered are Spanish, Italian, and Latin.
- Juniors and Seniors are required to enroll in electives, and are given to opportunity to choose among many: seven arts classes, computer classes, social sciences.
- Online classes offered in Latin (which is a new and developing course that currently only covers the first and second levels of the language) and Economics.

== Uniform ==
The uniform consists of a plaid kilt, white polo shirt, and a sweater. Each grade level wears a different color skirt. The skirt you receive as a freshman is again worn Sophomore year. Junior year a new skirt is worn and again worn senior year. At the end of Sophomore year, the class votes on what kilt pattern they will wear for the next two years (so that Juniors and Seniors end up having different kilts).

== Clubs and activities ==
The school nickname is the Lady Mustangs.

=== Co-curricular activities ===
- National Honor Society
- Art National Honor Society
- Italian National Honor Society
- Math National Honor Society
- Spanish National Honor Society
- Tri-M Music Honor Society

=== Student leadership clubs ===
- Mustangs Leading Mustangs
- Student Council

=== Academic based clubs ===
- Library
- Math
- Varsity Mock Trial Team (Note: In 2013, the Mock Trial Team won the Nassau County Bar Mock Trial Tournament, beating out 46 other high schools) (Note: In 2024, the Mock Trial Team made it to the top 16 in the Nassau County Bar Mock Trial Tournament)
- Windows literary club and magazine
- World Language & Culture

=== Service based clubs ===
- Equality Club
- Pax Christi
- Stangs for Life (Pro Life)

=== Music based clubs ===
- Band
- Mercy Sapphires
- Select Chorus

=== Acting clubs ===
- Mercy Players / Stage Crew
- Reverse Shakespeare

=== Dance based clubs ===
- Mercy Dance Company & Performance Ensemble
- Mercy Danceworks

=== Nature based clubs ===
- Green Team
- Equestrian Club

=== Artistic/creative clubs ===
- Video Club produces the Mercy Morning News
- The Tower yearbook club

=== Other activities ===
- Art
- Badminton
- Basketball
- Bowling (BOWLMA)
- Creative writing
- Crew
- Cross country
- Ecology
- Forensics
- Lacrosse
- Production Club
- Soccer
- Softball
- Sports Night and Spirit Week
- Swimming
- Tennis
- Track and Field
- Volleyball
- 3D Printing

== Traditions ==
Students and alumnae tend to refer to themselves as "Mercy Girls" even well after graduation.

There are several respected traditions. For example, the Senior Stairs (marble steps located in the center of the building) are reserved for use by seniors and staff only. The OLMA seal (a marble mosaic located at the foot of the Senior Stairs) is not stepped on. The student body is divided into two teams, Dots and Stripes, for a school-wide competition during Spirit Week and Sports Night.
