= St. Dominic High School (New York) =

Location
- 110 Anstice Street; Oyster Bay, (Nassau County), New York 11771; United States; 40°52′5″N 73°31′38″W

Information
- Type: Private, Coeducational
- Motto: Nil Sine Numine (Without God, Nothing)
- Religious affiliation: Roman Catholic
- Patron saint: St. Dominic
- Established: 1928
- Status: Open
- School district: Private
- Principal: Nicole Milkowski Interim
- Teaching staff: 35
- Grades: 9-12
- Average class size: 22
- Campus size: 6 acres
- Colors: Navy Blue and White
- Athletics conference: NSCHSAA
- Sports: baseball, basketball, football
- Mascot: Bayhawk
- Nickname: St. Doms
- Team name: Bayhawks
- Rival: Holy Trinity High School
- Accreditation: Middle States Association of Colleges and Schools
- Newspaper: Bayhawk Bulletin
- Endowment: $84,433,000 USD
- Tuition: $14,000 (2022)
- Website: http://hs.stdoms.org/

St. Dominic High School is a private Catholic high school in Oyster Bay, New York. It is located within the Diocese of Rockville Centre.

== Background ==
St. Dominic High School was established on September 10, 1928, by Rev. Charles J. Canivan, following the establishment of St. Dominic Elementary School September 8, 1924.

== Campus ==
The campus consists of four buildings: Canivan and Marian Hall, the New Science building, and a gymnasium complete with three basketball courts. Classrooms are located in Canivan and Marian Hall, while the cafeteria and auditorium are located in Canivan Hall. Outdoor athletic fields with an estimated value of US$23,000,000 were donated by Charles Wang and consist of baseball, softball, lacrosse, and soccer fields, plus tennis courts nearby in Muttontown. The school also shares the street with St. Dominic's Church and a smaller chapel.

== Athletics ==
St. Dominic High School offers the following teams:

BOYS: Basketball, Bowling, Football, Baseball, Tennis, Soccer, Cross Country, Winter and Spring Track, Golf, Lacrosse

GIRLS: Basketball, Softball, Bowling, Soccer, Swimming, Tennis, Lacrosse, Volleyball, Cross Country, Winter and Spring Track, Cheerleading.

- Boys New York State Federation High School Basketball Championships: 1980 (Class C), 1997 (Class B)
- Boys New York State CHSAA Championships: 1996
- Girls New York State Federation High School Basketball Championships: 1989, 1996 (Class B), 2003 (Class D)
- Girls New York State CHSAA Championships: 1994, 1996, 1998, 2003

== Notable alumni ==
- Reiss Knehr, (born 1996), professional baseball pitcher for the San Diego Padres of Major League Baseball (MLB).
- Lt. Joseph Mawad (March 19, 1998 - January 6, 2021.)Texas A&M Football, (Hero of Newburgh)
- Tim Kempton (born 1964), former (NBA) Basketball player.
- Jim Moran (born 1978), professional basketball player
- Todd Hodne (1959–2020), former Penn State Nittany Lions football linebacker and convicted rapist, robber and murderer.
- Rick Pitino (born 1952), Naismith Memorial Basketball Hall of Fame inductee as a coach
- Ralph Willard (born 1946), coached St. Dominic High School Basketball, 1973 to 1985.
- Mike Morgan (born 1978), 2018 & 2019 National Championship head coach at Merrimack College (Lacrosse)
- Jay Hernandez (born 1978), Assistant Coach - NBA Brooklyn Nets
