= Sacred Heart High School (Yonkers, New York) =

Location
- 34 Convent Avenue; Yonkers, (Westchester County), New York 10703; United States; 40°56′57.6″N 73°53′8.1″W

Information
- Type: Private, co-educational
- Religious affiliation: Roman Catholic
- Established: c.1923
- CEEB code: 336070
- President: Rev. Robert Abbatiello OFM, Cap.
- Principal: Kyle O'Donnell
- Director of Institutional Advancement and Alumni Relations: Lily Tucci
- Grades: 9–12
- Enrollment: 253 (2025-2026)
- Average class size: 23
- Hours in school day: 6
- Campus: Urban/Suburban
- Colors: Green and gold
- Slogan: "Catholic Education in an Atmosphere of Community."
- Team name: Sacred Heart Irish
- Accreditation: Middle States Association of Colleges and Schools
- Yearbook: Lance
- Tuition: $10,450 (2025–2026)
- Director of Admissions: Brendan Clark
- Director of Finance: Michele Rota
- Director of Tuition: Maura Friend
- Director of Athletics: Nze Tankeng
- Website: sacredhearths.org

Sacred Heart High School is an American co-educational private, Roman Catholic high school in Yonkers, New York. It is under the jurisdiction of the Roman Catholic Archdiocese of New York. It is the only Catholic high school in Yonkers.

It was founded in 1923 and named after the most holy Sacred Heart of Jesus. At the time of its founding, the Sacred Heart community was predominantly composed of Irish-American immigrants, which has had a large influence on the school's image and culture.

== Academics ==
Sacred Heart has a liberal arts curriculum, in accordance with a course of study prescribed by the University of the State of New York, which focuses on English, history, mathematics, the sciences, modern languages, and religion. Students are given the option to take Regents level, Honors or Advanced Placement classes depending on their individual performance.

All students are required to take four years of English, four years of religion, three years of any foreign language, four years of history, three years of mathematics, three years of science, one year of art, and are required to complete 25 service hours in order to graduate.

Senior students have the choice of taking elective courses in various academic subjects, and with prior approval, undergraduate courses in conjunction with Westchester Community College through its Advanced College Experience Program.

== Athletics ==
Sacred Heart has many athletic teams, most of them being gender specific. These sport teams include: Varsity Boys Soccer, Varsity Girls Soccer, Varsity & Junior Varsity Girls Volleyball, Varsity Bowling (Co-ed), Varsity Boys Basketball, Varsity Girls Basketball, Varsity Cheerleading, Varsity Boys Baseball, Varsity Girls Softball, Varsity Boys Volleyball, Varsity Girls Flag Football, Cross Country, Track, and Field. All the sports, excluding Cross Country, Track and Field are seasonal.

== Clubs ==
Sacred Heart has nearly three dozen clubs, many of these clubs being started by students and moderated by staff at the school. These clubs, as of September 2025, include:

- Ambassadors Club
- Anime Club
- Art Club
- Book Club
- Campus Ministry
- Crocheting Club
- Debate Club
- Film Club
- French Club
- Future Leaders Club
- Guitar Club
- Hearts for Homes
- Junior Prom Committee
- Kiwanis Club
- Literary Magazine
- Med Club
- Mental Health Awareness Committee
- Multicultural Committee
- National Honors Society
- NY Encounter
- Game Club
- Origami for Good
- Puzzle Club
- Sacred Heart Players (Drama Club)
- Underclassman Semiformal Committee
- Senior Prom Committee
- Social Media Club & Sacred Heart News
- Step Club
- Student Council
- The Write Stuff
- Weightlifting Club
- Yearbook Club

== Crest ==
The crest of Sacred Heart includes many symbols that reflect the school's heritage and values. The Fleur-de-lis symbol which can be found on the right side of the central shield represents the purity and light of God. The eighth son heraldry cross symbol which is found on the left side of the central shield, represents the suffering of Christ, the laurel wreath symbol which is on the bottom of the central shield, is meant to represent knowledge and scholarship, and lastly, the oil lamp that is on the top of the crest represents the light of God, originating from 2 Corinthians 4:6

== Notable alumni ==
- Jason Cerbone - actor
- Kristoffer Diaz - playwright
- Mike Spano – mayor, Yonkers; former member, New York State Assembly
- Ice Spice – rapper
