= Bishop Kearney High School (New York City) =

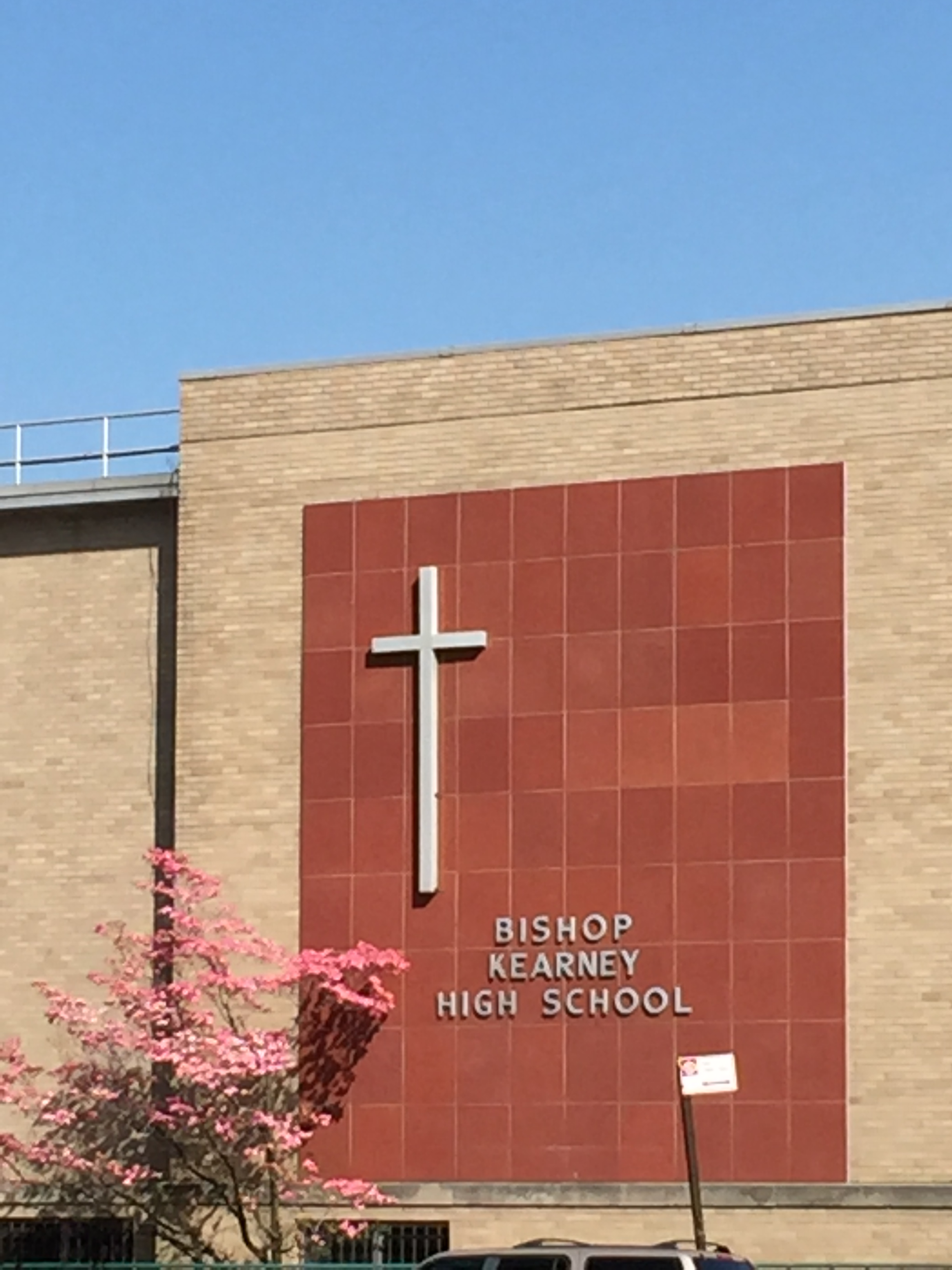
- Bishop Kearney High School

Location
- 2202 60th Street; Brooklyn, New York 11204; United States; 40°36′58″N 73°58′41″W

Information
- Type: Private, All-Female
- Motto: Dilige Justitiam (Work for Justice)
- Religious affiliation: Roman Catholic
- Established: 1961
- Closed: 2019
- Oversight: Sisters of Saint Joseph
- Head of School: Dr. Margaret Minson
- Grades: 9-12
- Average class size: 30
- Campus type: indoor school building
- Colors: Green and Gold
- Slogan: Educating Women Who Shape the Future.
- Song: Kearney Hail to Thee
- Athletics: basketball (v&jv), cheer, golf, soccer, softball (v&jv), step, swimming, tennis, track and volleyball(v&jv)
- Sports: See athletics
- Mascot: Tiger
- Nickname: Kearney
- Team name: Kearney
- Rival: Fontbonne Hall Academy but for sports Saint Edmund
- Accreditation: Middle States Association of Colleges and Schools
- Yearbook: Memorare
- Tuition: $10,200 (plus fees)
- Website: www.bishopkearneyhs.org

Bishop Kearney High School was an all-girls, private, Roman Catholic high school in Bensonhurst, Brooklyn, New York. It was located within the Roman Catholic Diocese of Brooklyn and sponsored by the Sisters of St. Joseph. It operated between 1961 and 2019.

== Background ==
Bishop Raymond A. Kearney High School was founded in 1961 as part of the Diocesan system of schools. It was dedicated by Most Rev. Brian Joseph McEntegart on November 2, 1961, and named in honor of the youngest auxiliary bishop of Brooklyn who had served the diocese from 1935 until his death on October 1, 1956.

The Sisters of Saint Joseph were asked to administer and staff the school. In 1973, the Henry Hald Association, which governed diocesan schools was dissolved and the school was purchased by the Sisters of Saint Joseph. It was incorporated and reopened as Bishop Kearney High School which was to be governed by a board of trustees. In 1994, the board was expanded to include not only the General Government of the Congregation but also parents, alumnae and other laypersons with expertise in education, finance, and plant management.

The administrators of Bishop Kearney High School have been: Sister Letitia Maria Flanagan, CSJ (1961–67) Sister Mary Jogues (Rose Tehan), CSJ (1967–70) Sister John Crucis (Helen Faulds), CSJ (1970–80) Sister Ann McCarthy (John Capistran), CSJ (1980–90) Sister Joan McAvoy (Maria Columba), CSJ (1990–2003) Sister Thomasine Stagnitta, CSJ (2003–2014) Dr. Margaret Minson (2014–2016) Ms. Martinez (2016–2017) Dr. Margaret Lacey-Berman (2017–2018) Dr. Margaret Minson (2018–2019)

Some significant dates in Bishop Kearney's history: Accredited by Middle States Association 1966 Mater Dei, Chapter of National Honor Society est. 1966 Incorporated by NYS Board of Regents 1973 Absolute Charter granted 1979

In his dedication address in 1961, Bishop McEntegart predicted: "In this school, young girls for decades to come will be taught the truths of God's word. They will receive an education second to none." The school is named for Bishop Raymond A. Kearney of the Diocese of Brooklyn.

On May 13, 2019, the school announced that after 58 years of operation, they would close on August 31, 2019.
