= List of 1983 films based on actual events =

This is a list of films and miniseries released in 1983 that are based on actual events. All films on this list are from American production unless indicated otherwise.

== 1983 ==
- Adam (1983) – crime drama television film portraying the story of the kidnapping and murder of Adam Walsh on 27 July 1981, along with the effects of this event on the marriage of John and Revé Walsh
- Adi Shankaracharya (Sanskrit: आदि शंकराचार्य) (1983) – Indian Sanskrit-language biographical drama film depicting the life and times of the Hindu philosopher, Adi Shankaracharya, who consolidated the doctrine of Advaita Vedanta (nondualism) in Hindu philosophy
- The Amorous Dentist (1983) – Australian crime drama television film about Sydney-based dentist Dr Louis Bertrand who fell in love with a patient's wife and killed her husband
- Antarctica (Japanese: 南極物語) (1983) – Japanese adventure drama film centring on the 1958 ill-fated Japanese scientific expedition to the South Pole, its dramatic rescue from the severe weather conditions on the return journey, the relationship between the scientists and their loyal and hard-working Sakhalin huskies, particularly the lead dogs Taro and Jiro, and the fates of the 15 dogs left behind to fend for themselves
- At First Sight (French: Coup de foudre) (1983) – French biographical drama film depicting the story of a Jewish refugee who marries a soldier to escape deportation to Germany; meanwhile a wealthy art student loses her first husband to a stray Resistance bullet
- Barefoot Gen (Japanese: はだしのゲン) (1983) – Japanese animated biographical war film depicting World War II in Japan from a child's point of view revolving around the events surrounding the bombing of Hiroshima
- Bill: On His Own (1983) – biographical drama television film about the life of Bill Sackter
- Choices of the Heart (1983) – drama television film based on the lives of the American Roman Catholic missionaries Jean Donovan, Dorothy Kazel, Maura Clarke, and Ita Ford, all of whom were murdered in El Salvador in 1980 during the Salvadoran Civil War
- The Cleopatras (1983) – British historical drama miniseries set in Ancient Egypt during the latter part of the Ptolemaic Dynasty with an emphasis on the Cleopatras
- Cross Creek (1983) – biographical romantic drama film based on the life of Marjorie Kinnan Rawlings as written in her memoir
- Danton (1983) – French-Polish-West German biographical drama film depicting the last weeks of Georges Danton, one of the leaders of the French Revolution
- The Dean Case (1983) – Australian crime drama television film telling the story of George Dean, a Sydney-based ferry boat master, arrested in 1895 for attempting to poison his wife
- Dempsey (1983) – biographical sport drama television film based on the life of the heavyweight boxer Jack Dempsey
- Edith and Marcel (French: Édith et Marcel) (1983) – French biographical romantic drama film about the love affair between the singer Édith Piaf and the boxer Marcel Cerdan
- Fear (German: Angst) (1983) – Austrian horror film following a psychopath recently released from prison; loosely based on real-life mass murderer Werner Kniesek
- For Those I Loved (French: Au nom de tous les miens) (1983) – French war drama film about a Polish Jewish Holocaust survivor who emigrated to the United States in 1946
- Forbidden Relations (Hungarian: Visszaesők) (1983) – Hungarian romantic drama film based on a true story when a love affair develops between a half brother and half-sister
- Frida Still Life (Spanish: Frida, naturaleza viva) (1983) – Mexican biographical drama film about the life of Frida Kahlo
- Girls of the White Orchid (1983) – crime drama television film based on true events in the life of actor Tom Allard, whose girlfriend answered an advertisement for American singers to entertain in Japan and found herself trapped in a prostitution-slavery ring operated by the yakuza
- Grace Kelly (1983) – biographical drama television film about the actress who became a princess, Grace Kelly
- Heart Like a Wheel (1983) – biographical sport drama film based on the life of drag racing driver Shirley Muldowney
- Hostage (1983) – Australian crime thriller film about an abused wife who learns in horror that her sadistic German-born husband is actually a fanatical neo-Nazi – based on the true story of Christine Maresch
- Kaviratna Kalidasa (Kannada: ಕವಿರತ್ನ ಕಾಳಿದಾಸ) (1983) – Indian Kannada-language historical drama film based on the life of Kālidāsa, a renowned Classical Sanskrit writer of the 4th Century
- Kennedy (1983) – American-British biographical drama miniseries about the 1961–1963 presidency of John F. Kennedy
- Living Proof: The Hank Williams Jr. Story (1983) – biographical drama television film based on Hank Williams Jr.'s life, under his mother's thumb, competing with the ghost of one of the most famous singers in C&W music history, and aspiring to rise above it all
- Martin Luther, Heretic (1983) – American-British biographical drama film depicting Martin Luther's life from 1506 to 1522 – from the beginning of Luther's monastic vocation to his return from exile at the Wartburg in 1522
- Merry Christmas, Mr. Lawrence (Japanese: 戦場のメリークリスマス) (1983) – Japanese war drama film based on the experiences of Sir Laurens van der Post as a prisoner of war in Japan during World War II
- Mother Mary (Russian: Мать Мария) (1983) – Soviet biographical drama film loosely based on real life events of poet Maria Skobtsova
- Murder in Coweta County (1983) – crime drama television film based on actual events of a murder in Coweta County in April 1948 committed in Coweta County in the U.S. state of Georgia
- Never Cry Wolf (1983) – adventure drama film depicting a fictional account of the author's subjective experience observing wolves in subarctic Canada
- Number 10 (1983) – British historical drama miniseries depicting the personal and political lives of seven British Prime Ministers, ranging from the 1780s to the 1920s, during their occupancy of 10 Downing Street
- Phar Lap (1983) – Australian family sport drama film about the racehorse Phar Lap
- Policewoman Centerfold (1983) – drama television film loosely based on the story of police officer Barbara Schantz who posed for Playboy magazine in 1982
- Qiu Jin (Mandarin: 秋瑾) (1983) – Chinese biographical drama film based on the real life of Qiu Jin, focusing on her efforts in the 1900s to overthrow the corruption Qing Empire
- Quarterback Princess (1983) – sport drama television film about Tami Maida who had the courage and determination to fight to play on her high school football team
- Razia Sultan (Hindi: रजिया सुल्तान) (1983) – Indian Hindi-language historical biographical film based on the life of Razia Sultan, the only female Sultan of Delhi and her speculated love affair with the Abyssinian slave, Jamal-ud-Din Yakut
- Red Monarch (1983) – British comedy drama film depicting Soviet politics and the interplay between Stalin and his lieutenants, particularly Beria, during the last years of Stalin's rule
- Reilly, Ace of Spies (1983) – British crime drama miniseries dramatizing the life of Sidney Reilly, a Russian-born adventurer who became one of the greatest spies ever to work for the United Kingdom and the British Empire
- Rembetiko (Greek: Ρεμπέτικο) (1983) – Greek biographical drama film based on the life of rebetiko singer Marika Ninou
- The Right Stuff (1983) – epic historical drama film following the Navy, Marine, and Air Force test pilots who were involved in aeronautical research at Edwards Air Force Base, California, as well as the Mercury Seven, the seven military pilots who were selected to be the astronauts for Project Mercury, the first human spaceflight by the United States
- Rita Hayworth: The Love Goddess (1983) – biographical drama television film dealing with real events in the life of actress Rita Hayworth from 1931 to 1952
- Running Brave (1983) – Canadian biographical sport drama film based on the story of Billy Mills, a member or the Oglala Sioux tribe located in South Dakota
- Sadat (1983) – biographical drama miniseries based on the life and death of the late 3rd President of Egypt, Anwar Sadat
- The Scarlet and the Black (1983) – American-Italian-British historical war drama television film telling the story of Monsignor Hugh O'Flaherty, a real-life Irish Catholic priest who saved thousands of Jews and escaped Allied POWs in Rome
- Semyon Dezhnev (Russian: Семён Дежнёв) (1983) – Soviet adventure film about the Russian traveler Semyon Dezhnev, who discovered new Siberian lands, sailed from the Stone Belt to the east of the Eurasian continent and discovered the strait between Asia and North America
- Silkwood (1983) – biographical drama film detailing the life of Karen Silkwood, a nuclear whistle-blower and a labor union activist who investigated alleged wrongdoing at the Kerr-McGee plutonium plant where she worked
- Spring Symphony (German: Frühlingssinfonie) (1983) – West German historical drama film portraying the life of the pianist Clara Wieck and her relationship with the composer Robert Schumann
- Star 80 (1983) – biographical drama film based on the story of Canadian Playboy model Dorothy Stratten, who was murdered by her husband Paul Snider in 1980
- The Story of Piera (Italian: Storia di Piera) (1983) – Italian biographical drama film about the incestuous relationship of a mother and daughter – based on the autobiography of Italian theater actress Piera Degli Esposti
- Summerspell (1983) – biographical drama film following family celebrations and tensions on Independence Day in Texas 1948
- The Terry Fox Story (1983) – American-Canadian biographical sport drama television film about Canadian amputee and runner Terry Fox
- Uncommon Valor (1983) – action war film about a former U.S. Marine colonel who puts together a rag-tag team to rescue his son, who he believes is among those still held in Laos after the Vietnam War – based on a true story
- Undercover (1983) – Australian historical comedy film about the rise of Berlei, a popular Australian brand of women's lingerie, famous for its bras and girdles
- Wagner (1983) – biographical drama miniseries based on the life of Richard Wagner
- Who Will Love My Children? (1983) – biographical drama television film based on the life of Lucile Fray who was diagnosed with cancer in 1952 and wanted to find suitable homes for her ten children, since she felt her husband could not properly care for them
- Winter 1960 (French: Hiver 60) (1983) – Belgian drama film depicting the huge strike in Belgium in Winter 1960–61 against the government of Gaston Eyskens who wanted to improve the public finances with drastic measures of austerity which meant social regression for the people
- Without a Trace (1983) – mystery drama film partly based on the disappearance of Etan Patz
- Zille and Me (German: Zille und ick) (1983) – East German musical drama film loosely based on the life of famous german social-critical painter Heinrich Zille
