= 1980 =

1980 in various calendars
- Gregorian calendar: 1980; MCMLXXX
- Ab urbe condita: 2733
- Armenian calendar: 1429; ԹՎ ՌՆԻԹ
- Assyrian calendar: 6730
- Baháʼí calendar: 136–137
- Balinese saka calendar: 1901–1902
- Bengali calendar: 1386–1387
- Berber calendar: 2930
- British Regnal year: 28 Eliz. 2 – 29 Eliz. 2
- Buddhist calendar: 2524
- Burmese calendar: 1342
- Byzantine calendar: 7488–7489
- Chinese calendar: 己未年 (Earth Goat); 4677 or 4470 — to — 庚申年 (Metal Monkey); 4678 or 4471
- Coptic calendar: 1696–1697
- Discordian calendar: 3146
- Ethiopian calendar: 1972–1973
- Hebrew calendar: 5740–5741
- Hindu calendars
- Vikram Samvat: 2036–2037
- Shaka Samvat: 1901–1902
- Kali Yuga: 5080–5081
- Holocene calendar: 11980
- Igbo calendar: 980–981
- Iranian calendar: 1358–1359
- Islamic calendar: 1400–1401
- Japanese calendar: Shōwa 55 (昭和５５年)
- Javanese calendar: 1912–1913
- Juche calendar: 69
- Julian calendar: Gregorian minus 13 days
- Korean calendar: 4313
- Minguo calendar: ROC 69 民國69年
- Nanakshahi calendar: 512
- Thai solar calendar: 2523
- Tibetan calendar: ས་མོ་ལུག་ལོ་ (female Earth-Sheep); 2106 or 1725 or 953 — to — ལྕགས་ཕོ་སྤྲེ་ལོ་ (male Iron-Monkey); 2107 or 1726 or 954
- Unix time: 315532800 – 347155199

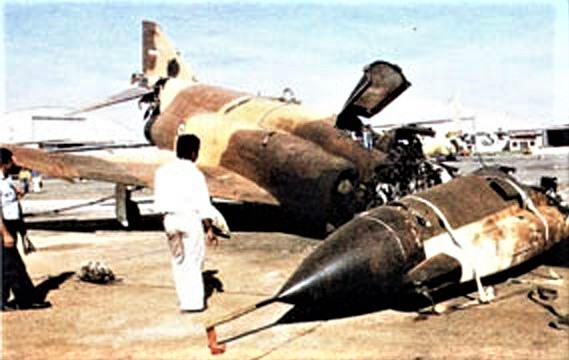
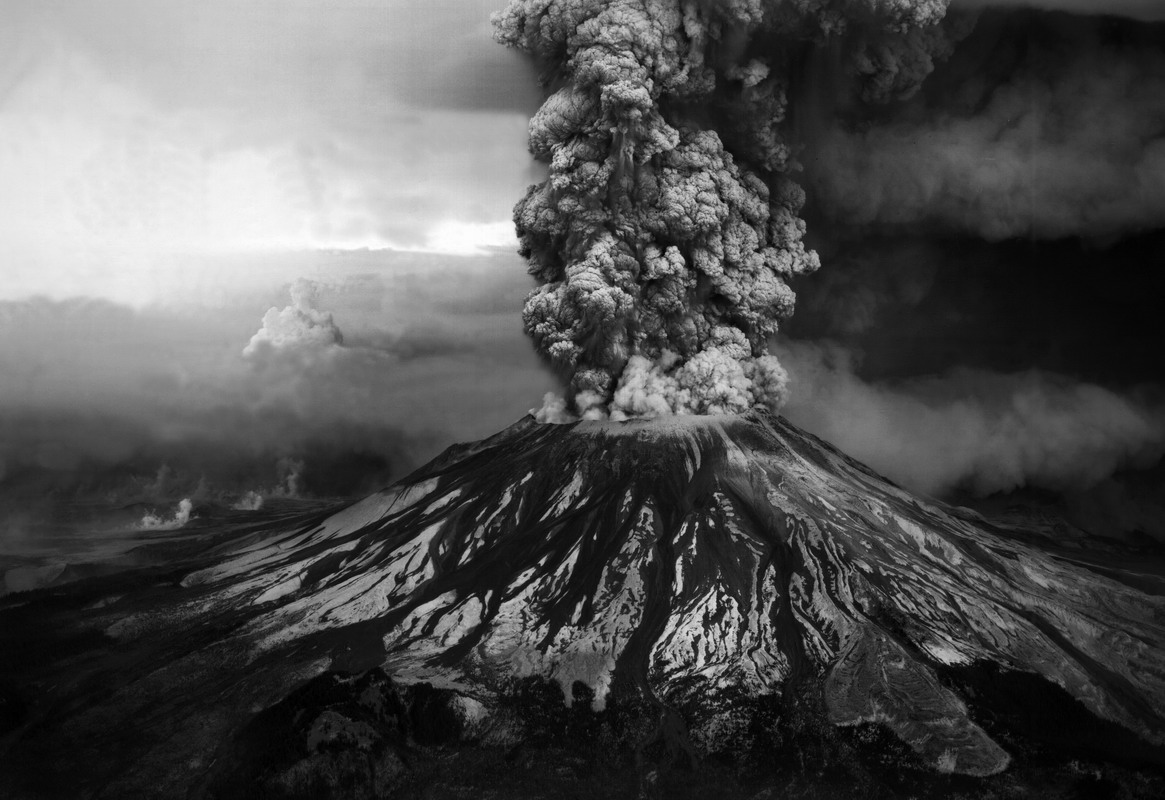
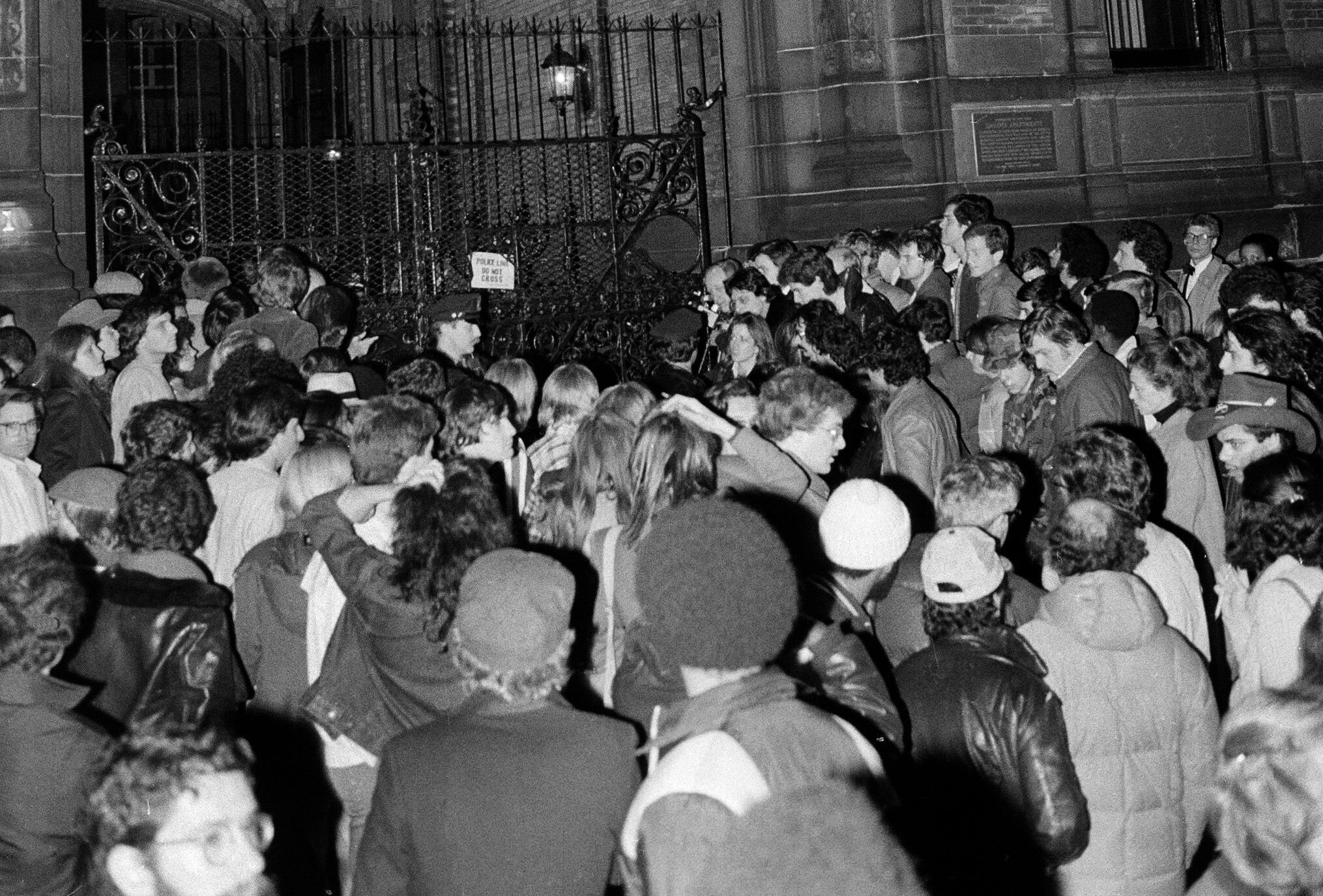
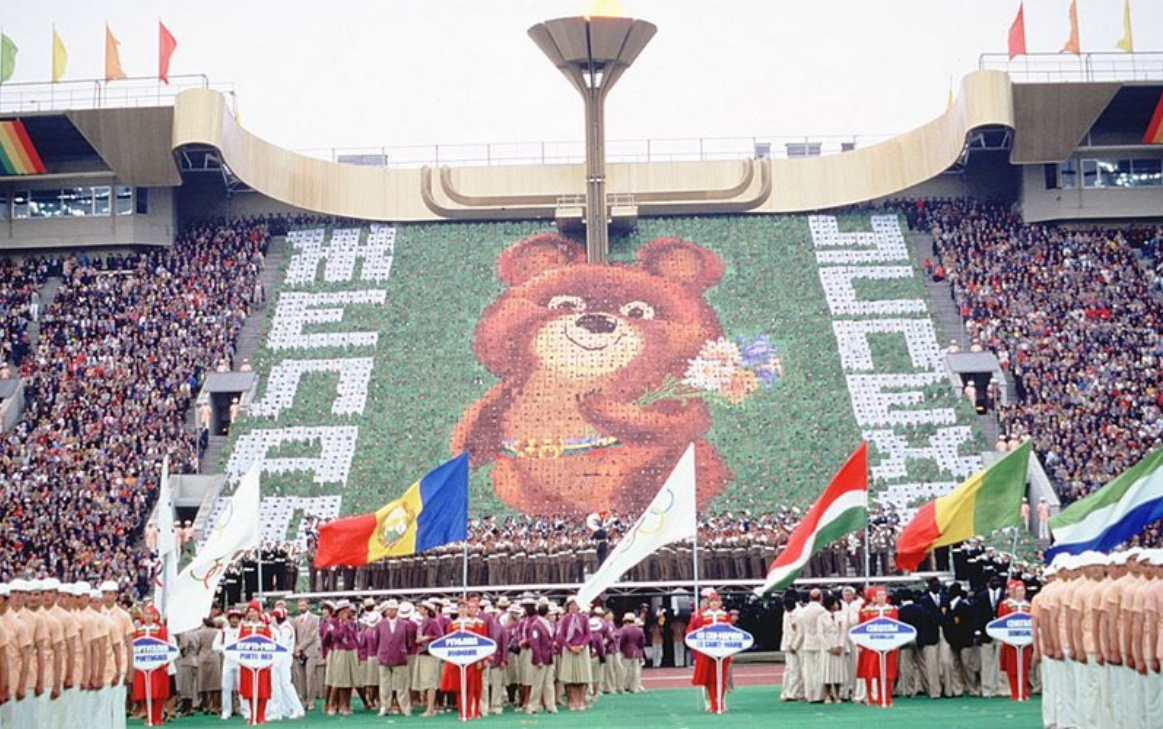
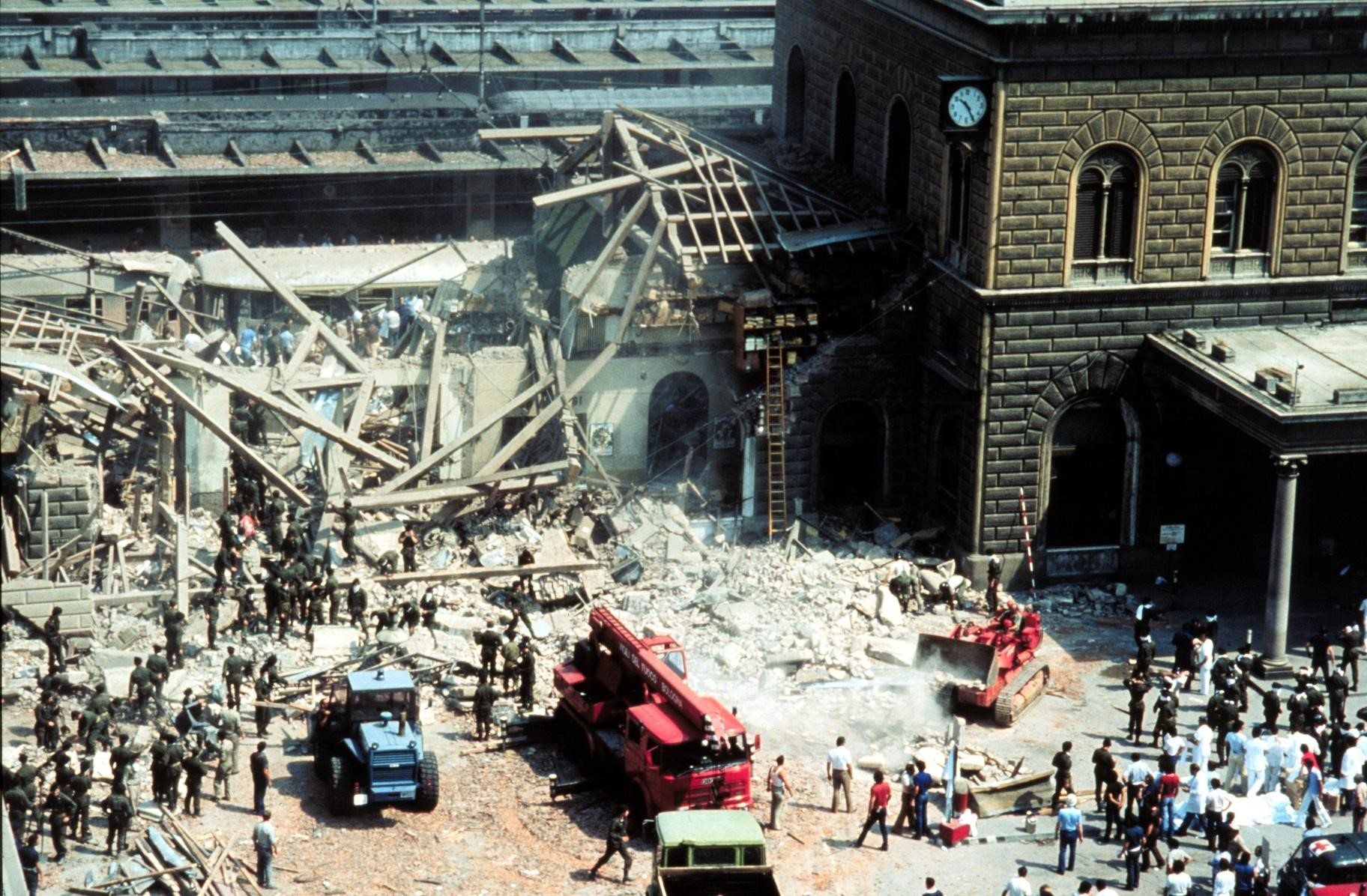
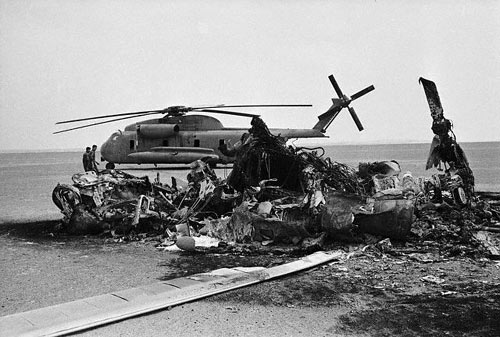
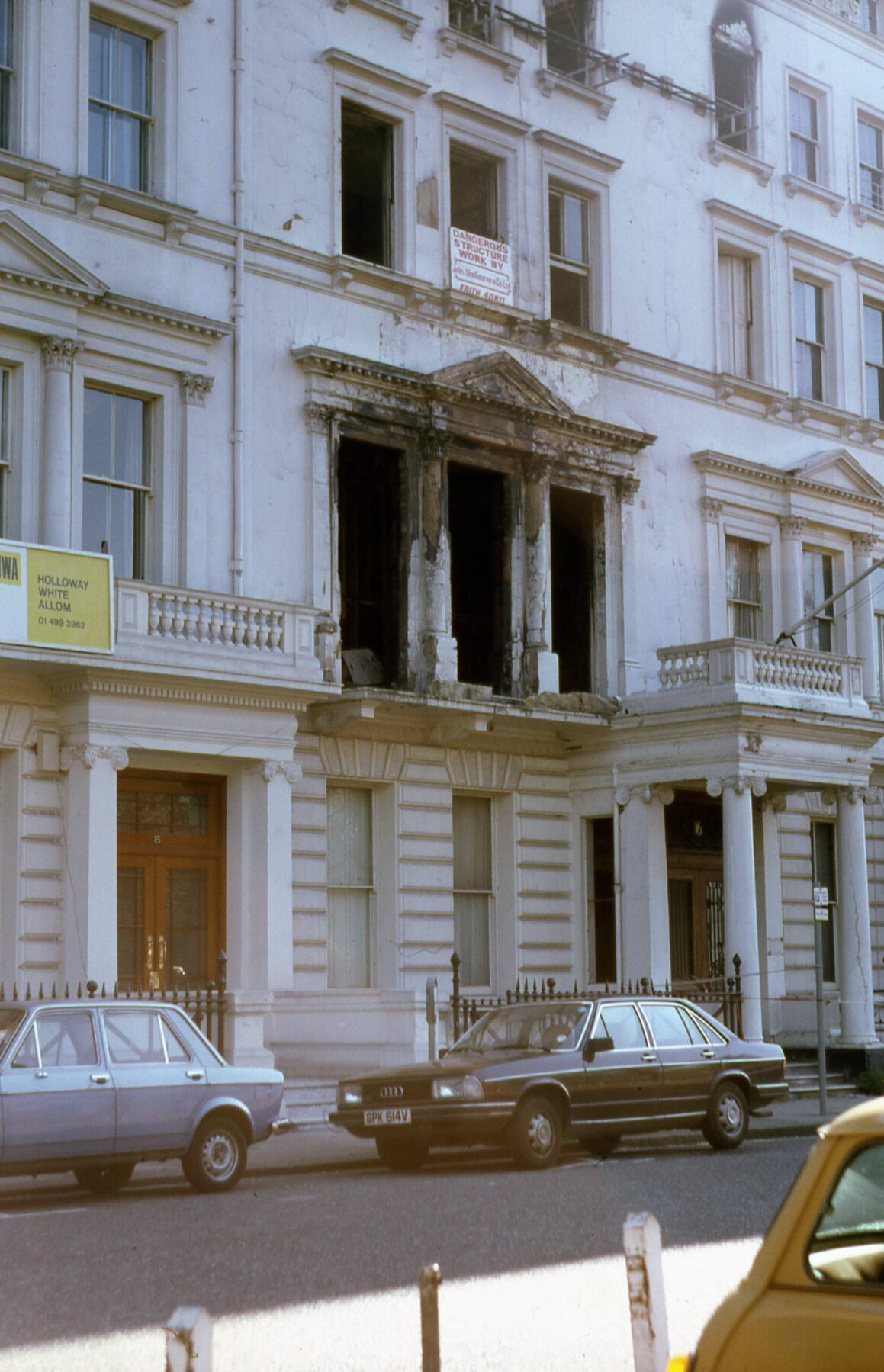
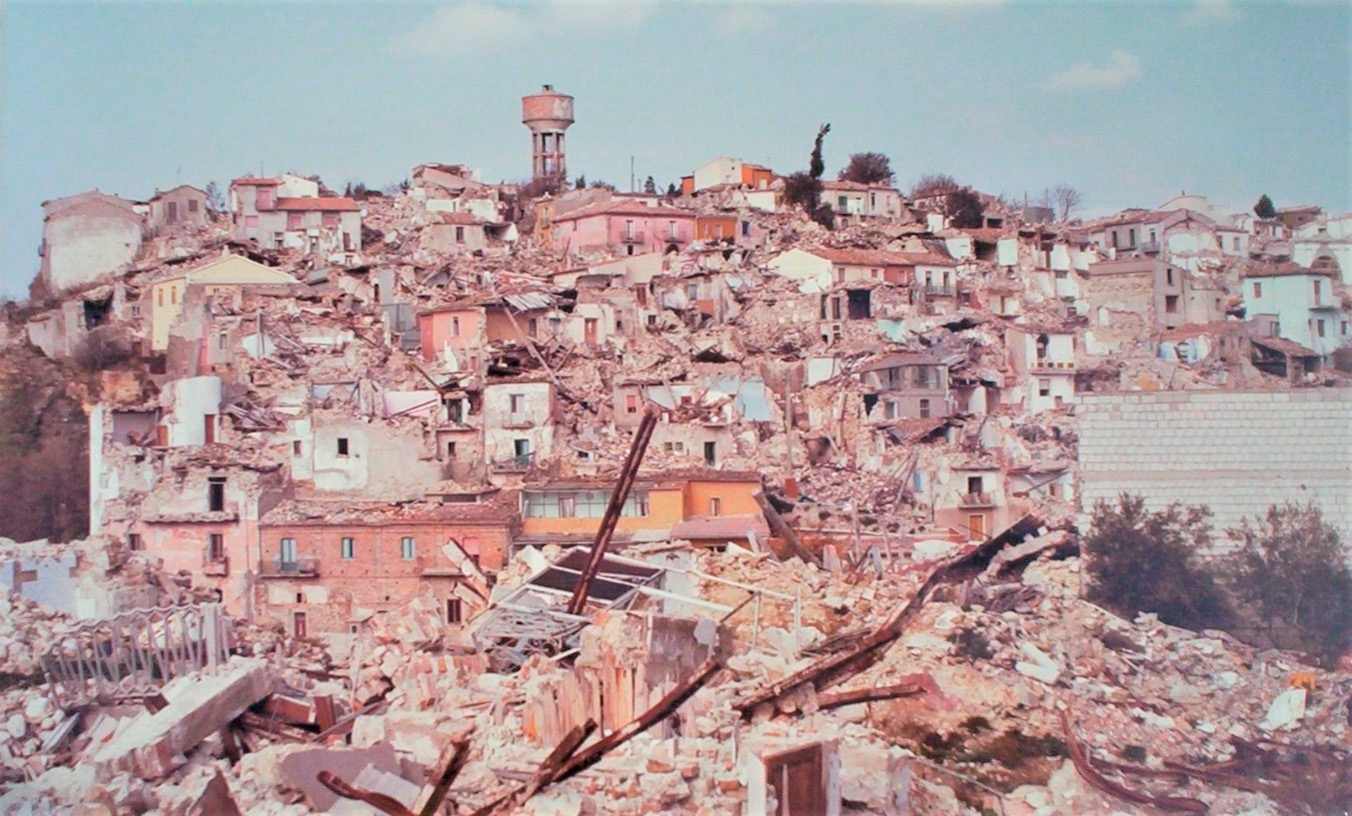
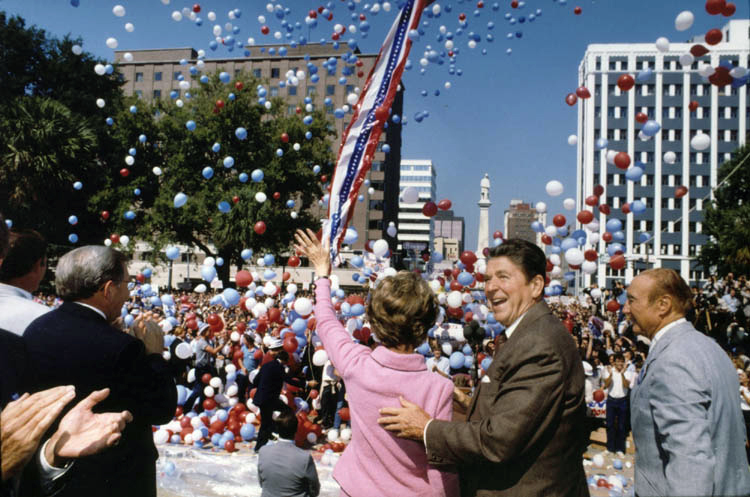
From top to bottom, left to right: the Iran–Iraq War begins; Mount St. Helens erupts in Washington, killing 57 people; John Lennon is shot and killed in New York City, shocking the world; the 1980 Summer Olympics are held in Moscow amid a widespread boycott led by the United States; the Bologna massacre kills 85 people in Bologna; Operation Eagle Claw fails in Iran during the Iran hostage crisis; the Iranian Embassy siege unfolds in London; the 1980 Irpinia earthquake devastates southern Italy; and the 1980 United States presidential election sees Ronald Reagan defeat Jimmy Carter, ushering in the Reagan era.

1980 (MCMLXXX) was a leap year starting on Tuesday of the Gregorian calendar, the 1980th year of the Common Era (CE) and Anno Domini (AD) designations, the 980th year of the 2nd millennium, the 80th year of the 20th century, and the 1st year of the 1980s decade.

== Events ==
=== January ===
- January 1 – Changes to the succession to the Swedish throne come into effect, introducing absolute primogeniture, thus placing Crown Princess Victoria first in line to the throne (heir apparent), ahead of her baby brother. Sweden is the first monarchy to adopt this rule of succession. Members of the royal family may also now marry commoners without losing their place in the succession.
- January 4 – U.S. President Jimmy Carter proclaims a grain embargo against the USSR with the support of the European Commission.
- January 6 – Global Positioning System time epoch begins at 00:00 UTC.
- January 9 – In Saudi Arabia, 63 Islamist insurgents are beheaded for their part in the siege of the Great Mosque in Mecca in November 1979.
- January 14 – Indian National Congress party leader Indira Gandhi returns to power as the Prime Minister of India.
- January 20 – At least 200 people are killed when the Corralejas Bullring collapses at Sincelejo, Colombia.
- January 21 – The London Gold Fixing hits its highest price ever of $843 per troy ounce ($2,249.50 in 2020 when adjusted for inflation).
- January 22 – Andrei Sakharov, Soviet scientist and human rights activist, is arrested in Moscow.
- January 26 – Israel and Egypt establish diplomatic relations.
- January 27 – Canadian Caper: Six United States diplomats, posing as Canadians, manage to escape from Tehran, Iran, as they board a flight to Zürich, Switzerland, on Swissair.
- January 31 – Burning of the Spanish Embassy in Guatemala: The Spanish Embassy in Guatemala is invaded and set on fire, killing 36 people. In the United States, it is dubbed "Spain's own Tehran".

=== February ===
- February 2 – Abscam: FBI personnel target members of the Congress of the United States in a sting operation.
- February 2–3 – The New Mexico State Penitentiary riot takes place; 33 inmates are killed and more than 100 inmates injured.
- February 4 – Abolhassan Banisadr is sworn in as the first President of Iran after winning the January 25 presidential election.
- February 13 – The 1980 Winter Olympics open in Lake Placid, New York.
- February 15 – In Vanuatu, followers of John Frum's cargo cult on the island of Tanna declare secession as the nation of Tafea.
- February 16 – A total solar eclipse is seen in North Africa and West Asia. It was the 50th solar eclipse of Solar Saros 130.
- February 22 – The US upset the USSR in the Olympics, a hockey game known as the Miracle on Ice. They then proceeded to defeat Finland to secure their first of two gold medals since 1960.
- February 23 – Ayatollah Ruhollah Khomeini states that Iran's parliament will decide the fate of the American embassy hostages.
- February 25 – A coup in Suriname ousts the government of Henck Arron; leaders Dési Bouterse and Roy Horb replace it with a National Military Council.
- February 27 – M-19 guerrillas begin the Dominican embassy siege in Colombia, holding 60 people hostage, including 14 ambassadors.
- February 29 – An ordinary leap day, which only appears once every four years.

=== March ===
- March 1
  - The Commonwealth Trade Union Council is established.
  - The Voyager 1 probe confirms the existence of Janus, a moon of Saturn.
- March 3 – Pierre Trudeau returns to office as Prime Minister of Canada.
- March 4 – Robert Mugabe is elected Prime Minister of Zimbabwe.
- March 8 – The Soviet Union's first rock music festival starts.
- March 14 – LOT Polish Airlines Flight 007 crashes during an emergency landing near Warsaw, Poland, killing a 14-man American boxing team and 73 others.
- March 18 – Fifty people are killed at the Plesetsk Cosmodrome in Russia, when a Vostok-2M rocket explodes on its launch pad during a fueling operation.
- March 19–20 – The MV Mi Amigo, the ship housing pirate radio station Radio Caroline, sinks off the English coast (the station returns aboard a new ship in 1983).
- March 21 – U.S. President Jimmy Carter announces that the United States will boycott the 1980 Summer Olympics in Moscow because of the Soviet invasion of Afghanistan.
- March 26 – A mine lift cage at the Vaal Reefs gold mine in South Africa falls 1.9 kilometres (1.2 mi), killing 23 workers.
- March 27 – The Norwegian oil platform Alexander L. Kielland collapses in the North Sea, killing 123 of its crew of 212.
- March 28 – The Talpiot Tomb is discovered by construction workers in Jerusalem.

=== April ===
- April 1 – The Southern African Development Coordination Conference (SADCC) is formed in Lusaka, Zambia.
- April 2 – The St Pauls riot breaks out in Bristol.
- April 7 – The United States severs diplomatic relations with Iran and imposes economic sanctions, following the taking of American hostages on November 4, 1979.
- April 10 – In Lisbon, Portugal, the governments of Spain and the United Kingdom agree to reopen the border between Gibraltar and Spain (closed since 1969) in 1985.
- April 12
  - 1980 Liberian coup d'état: Samuel K. Doe overthrows the government of Liberia in a violent coup d'état, executing President William Tolbert and ending over 130 years of democratic presidential succession in that country.
  - Terry Fox begins his Marathon of Hope, a plan to run across Canada to raise money for cancer research, setting off from St. John's, Newfoundland and running westward.
- April 14 – Iron Maiden's debut self-titled album Iron Maiden is released in the U.K.
- April 18 – Zimbabwe gains de jure independence from the United Kingdom with Robert Mugabe as its first Prime Minister.
- April 24–25 – Operation Eagle Claw, a commando mission in Iran to rescue American embassy hostages, is aborted after mechanical problems ground the rescue helicopters. Eight United States troops are killed in a mid-air collision during the failed operation.
- April 25 – Dan-Air Flight 1008 crashes in Tenerife, killing all 146 occupants; at the time it was the worst air disaster involving a British-registered aircraft in terms of loss of life.
- April 26 – Louise and Charmian Faulkner disappear from outside their flat in St Kilda, Victoria, Australia.
- April 27 – The Dominican embassy siege in Colombia ends with all remaining hostages released after the guerrillas are allowed to escape to Cuba.
- April 30
  - Iranian Embassy siege: Six Iranian-born terrorists take over the Iranian embassy in London, England. SAS retakes the Embassy on May 5; one terrorist survives.
  - Queen Juliana of the Netherlands abdicates and her daughter Beatrix accedes to the throne.

=== May ===
- May 1 – "About that Urban Renaissance...", an article by journalist Dan Rottenberg in Chicago, contains the first recorded use of the word "yuppie".
- May 2 – Referendum on system of government held in Nepal.
- May 4 – Yugoslav President Josip Broz Tito dies. The largest state funeral in history is organized, with state delegations from 128 different countries out of 154 UN members at the time.
- May 7 – Paul Geidel, convicted of second-degree murder in 1911, is released from prison in Beacon, New York, after 68 years and 245 days (the longest-ever time served by an inmate).
- May 8 – Global eradication of smallpox certified by the World Health Organization.
- May 9
  - In Florida, United States, the Liberian freighter Summit Venture hits the Sunshine Skyway Bridge over Tampa Bay. A 1,400-foot (430 m) section of the bridge collapses and 35 people (most of them on a bus) are killed.
  - James Alexander George Smith "Jags" McCartney the Turks and Caicos Islands' first chief minister, is killed in a plane crash over New Jersey.
- May 14 – The Sumpul River massacre occurs in Chalatenango, El Salvador.
- May 17 – Internal conflict in Peru: On the eve of presidential elections, Maoist guerrilla group Shining Path attacks a polling location in the town of Chuschi, Ayacucho.
- May 18 – The 1980 eruption of Mount St. Helens volcano in Washington (state) kills 57 and causes US$3 billion in damage.
- May 18–27 – Gwangju Uprising: Students in Gwangju, South Korea, begin demonstrations, calling for democratic reforms.
- May 20 – 1980 Quebec referendum: Voters in Quebec reject, by a vote of 60%, a proposal to seek independence from Canada.
- May 22 – Namco's Pac-Man, the highest-earning arcade game of all time, is released in Japan.
- May 24 – The International Court of Justice calls for the release of U.S. Embassy hostages in Tehran.
- May 26 – John Frum supporters in Vanuatu storm government offices on the island of Tanna. Vanuatu government troops land the next day and drive them away.
- May 28 – A fiery bus crash near the small village of Webb, Saskatchewan, Canada, claims 22 lives.

=== June ===
- June 1 – The first 24-hour news channel, Cable News Network (CNN), is launched.
- June 3 – 1980 Grand Island tornado outbreak: A series of deadly tornadoes strikes Grand Island, Nebraska, causing over $300m in damage, killing five people and injuring over 250.
- June 10 – Apartheid: The African National Congress in South Africa publishes a statement by their imprisoned leader Nelson Mandela.
- June 23–September 6 – The 1980 United States heat wave claims 1,700 lives.
- June 23
  - Sanjay Gandhi, the politically influential son of Prime Minister Indira Gandhi, is killed in a plane crash.
  - Tim Berners-Lee begins work on ENQUIRE, the system that will eventually lead to the creation of the World Wide Web in autumn 1990.
- June 25 – A Muslim Brotherhood assassination attempt against Syrian president Hafez al-Assad fails. Assad retaliates by sending the army against them.
- June 27
  - Itavia Flight 870 crashes into the sea near Ustica island, Italy, killing all 81 people on board. The cause of the accident remains unclear.
  - U.S. President Jimmy Carter signs Proclamation 4771, requiring 18- to 25-year-old males to register for a peacetime military draft, in response to the Soviet invasion of Afghanistan.
- June 29 – Vigdís Finnbogadóttir is elected President of Iceland, making her the first woman democratically elected as head of state.

=== July ===
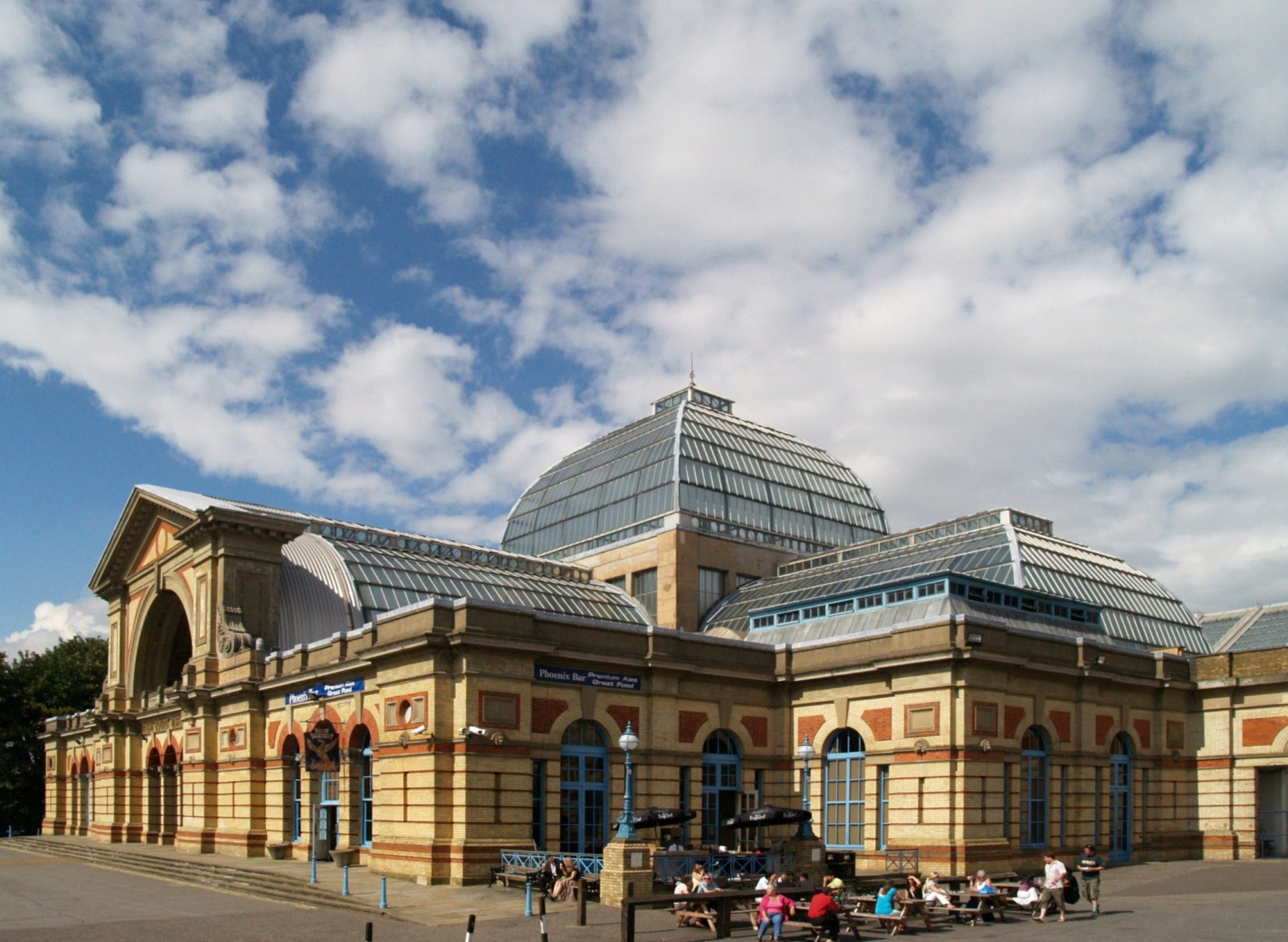
July 10: Fire at Alexandra Palace

July 18: Rede Tupi stopped broadcasting

- July 8 – A wave of strikes begins in Lublin, Poland.
- July 9 – Pope John Paul II visits Brazil; seven people are crushed to death in a crowd waiting to see him at afternoon Mass at the stadium in Fortaleza.
- July 16 – Former California Governor and actor Ronald Reagan is nominated for U.S. president, at the 1980 Republican National Convention in Detroit. Influenced by the Religious Right, the convention also drops its long-standing support for the Equal Rights Amendment, dismaying moderate Republicans.
- July 18 – Rede Tupi, a Brazilian television channel in São Paulo, stopped broadcasting.
- July 19 – Former Turkish Prime Minister Nihat Erim is killed by two gunmen in Istanbul, Turkey.
- July 19–August 3 – The 1980 Summer Olympics are held in Moscow, Soviet Union. As 82 countries boycott the Games, athletes from 16 of them participate under a neutral flag.
- July 30
  - Vanuatu gains independence.
  - Israel's Knesset passes the Jerusalem Law.

=== August ===
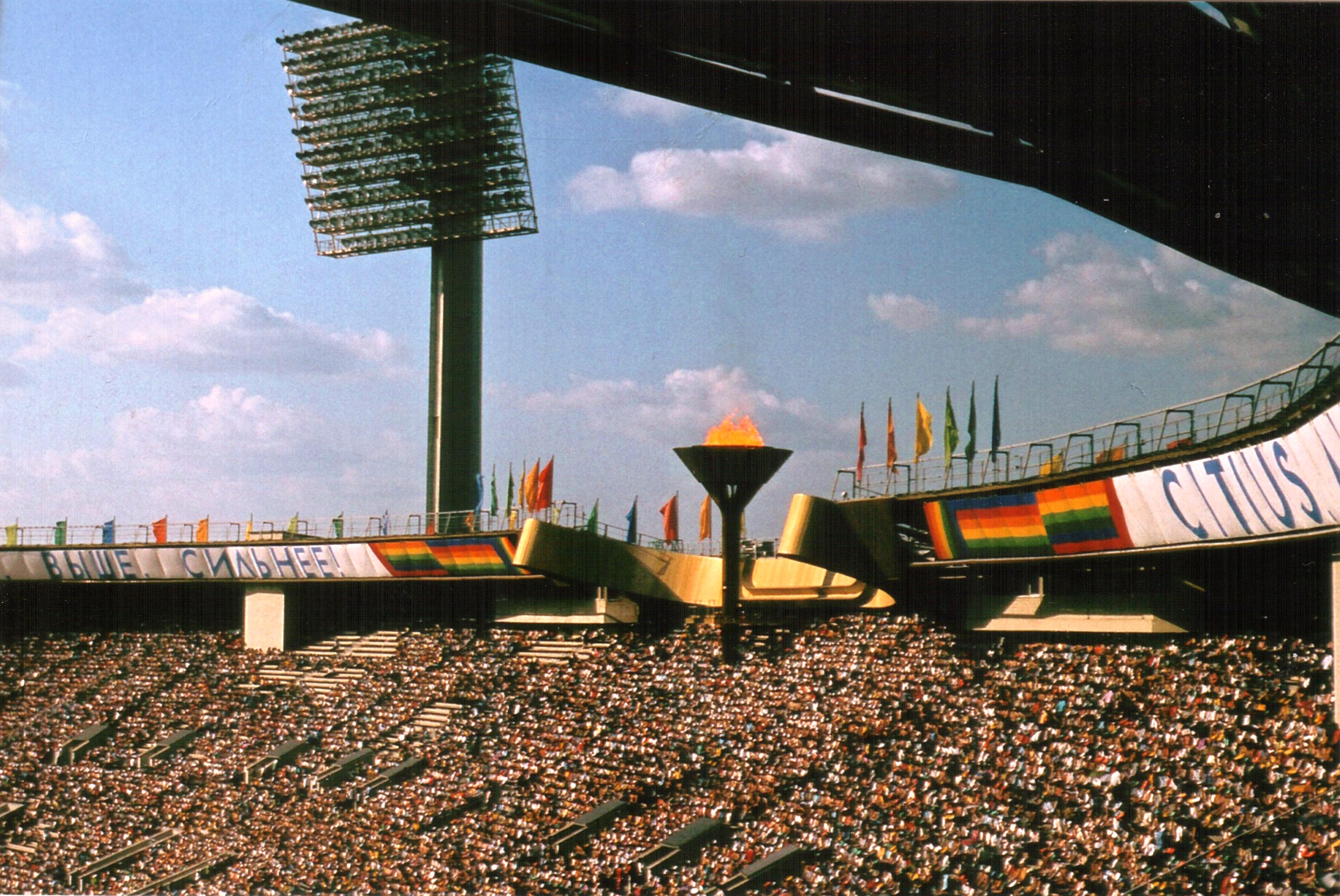
Moscow Olympic Games on August 2, 1980

- August 1 – Vigdís Finnbogadóttir becomes the 4th President of Iceland, the world's first democratically directly elected female president.
- August 2 – Strage di Bologna: A terrorist bombing at the Bologna Centrale railway station in Italy kills 85 people and wounds more than 200.
- August 3 – The 1980 Summer Olympics in Moscow officially ends.
- August 4 – Hurricane Allen (category 5) pounds Haiti, where it kills more than 200 people.
- August 7–31 – Lech Wałęsa leads the first of many strikes at the Gdańsk Shipyard in the Polish People's Republic.
- August 17 – In Australia, baby Azaria Chamberlain disappears from a campsite at Ayers Rock (Uluru), reportedly taken by a dingo.
- August 19 – In one of aviation's worst disasters, 301 people are killed when Saudia Flight 163 catches fire in Riyadh, Saudi Arabia.
- August 31 – Victory of the strike in Gdańsk Shipyard, Poland. The Gdańsk Agreement is signed, opening a way to start the first free (i.e. not state-controlled) trade union in the communist bloc, "Solidarity" (Solidarność).

=== September ===
- September 1 – Terry Fox is forced to end his Marathon of Hope run outside of Thunder Bay, Ontario, Canada, after finding out that the cancer has spread to his lungs.
- September 2 – Ford Europe launches the Escort MK3, a new front-wheel-drive hatchback. Punk band Dead Kennedys release their debut album, Fresh Fruit for Rotting Vegetables.
- September 3 – Zimbabwe breaks diplomatic and consular relations with South Africa, even though it maintains a commercial mission in Johannesburg.
- September 5 – The Gotthard Road Tunnel opens in Switzerland as the world's longest highway tunnel, at 16.3 kilometres (10.1 mi), stretching from Göschenen to Airolo beneath the Gotthard Pass.
- September 12 – Kenan Evren stages a military coup in Turkey. It stops political gang violence, but begins stronger state violence leading to the execution of many young activists.
- September 17 – After weeks of strikes at the Lenin Shipyard in Gdańsk, Poland, the nationwide independent trade union Solidarity is established.
- September 21 – Bülent Ulusu, ex admiral, forms the new government of Turkey (44th government, composed mostly of technocrats).
- September 22 – The command council of Iraq orders its army to "deliver its fatal blow on Iranian military targets", initiating the Iran–Iraq War.
- September 26
  - Oktoberfest bombing: 13 people are killed and 211 injured in a right-wing terror attack in Munich (West Germany).
  - The Mariel boatlift in Cuba officially ends.
- September 30 – Digital Equipment Corporation, Intel and Xerox introduce the DIX standard for Ethernet, which is the first implementation outside of Xerox and the first to support 10 Mbit/s speeds.

=== October ===
- October 5 – The Elisabeth blast furnace is demolished at Bilston Steelworks, marking the end of iron and steel production in the Black Country region of the U.K.
- October 10 – The 7.1 M_{w} El Asnam earthquake shakes northern Algeria with a maximum Mercalli intensity of X (Extreme), killing 2,633–5,000 and injuring 8,369–9,000.
- October 14
  - The Staggers Rail Act is enacted, deregulating American railroads.
  - The 6th Congress of the Workers' Party ends, having anointed North Korean President Kim Il Sung's son Kim Jong Il as his successor.
- October 15 – James Callaghan announces his resignation as leader of the British Labour Party.
- October 16 – The most recent atmospheric nuclear weapons test to date was conducted by China.
- October 18 – 1980 Australian federal election: Malcolm Fraser's Liberal/National Country Coalition government is re-elected with a substantially reduced majority, defeating the Labor Party led by Bill Hayden. The Government also loses control of the Senate, with the Australian Democrats winning the balance of power.
- October 20
  - Greece rejoins the NATO military structure.
  - In continuous production since 1962, the last MG MGB roadster rolls off the assembly line at the Abingdon-on-Thames (England) factory, ending production for the MG Cars marque.
- October 21 – In Major League Baseball, The Philadelphia Phillies of the National League defeat the Kansas City Royals of the American League, 4–1, in Game Six of the World Series to win the championship.
- October 25 – Proceedings on the Hague Convention on the Civil Aspects of International Child Abduction conclude at The Hague.
- October 27
  - Six Provisional Irish Republican Army prisoners in Maze prison in Northern Ireland refuse food and demand status as political prisoners; the hunger strike lasts until December.
  - The Chun Doo-hwan government forcibly arrests and investigates monks and personnel of the Jogye Order.
- October 30 – El Salvador and Honduras sign a peace treaty to put the border dispute fought over in 1969's Football War before the International Court of Justice.
- October 31
  - The Polish government recognizes Solidarity.
  - Reza Pahlavi, eldest son of the Shah of Iran, proclaims himself the rightful successor to the Peacock Throne.

=== November ===
- November 4 – 1980 United States presidential election: Republican challenger and former Governor Ronald Reagan of California defeats incumbent Democratic President Jimmy Carter and is elected the 40th President of the United States.
- November 10–12 – Voyager program: The NASA space probe Voyager I makes its closest approach to Saturn, when it flies within 77,000 miles (124,000 km) of the planet's cloud-tops and sends the first high-resolution images of the world back to scientists on Earth.
- November 20 – The Gang of Four trial begins in China.
- November 21 – A fire at the MGM Grand Hotel and Casino on the Las Vegas Strip kills 85 people.
- November 23 – The 6.9 M_{w} Irpinia earthquake shakes southern Italy with a maximum Mercalli intensity of X (Extreme). Officially, there were 2,483 people killed and 8,934 injured, though the deaths may have been as high as 4,900.

=== December ===
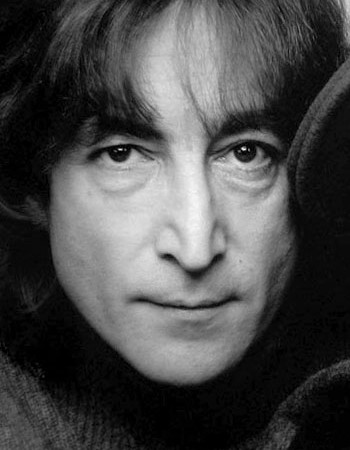
December 8: The former Beatles member and peace activist John Lennon is shot dead outside his home in New York.

- December 2 – A missionary (Jean Donovan) and three Roman Catholic nuns (Maura Clarke, Ita Ford, Dorothy Kazel), all Americans, are murdered by a military death squad in El Salvador while doing charity work during that country's civil war.
- December 8 – Murder of John Lennon: Mark David Chapman is arrested following the murder of English musician John Lennon, formerly of the Beatles, outside his New York City apartment building, The Dakota.
- December 14 – Four people are murdered and four others are injured by two armed robbers at Bob's Big Boy on La Cienega Boulevard in Los Angeles, United States, in what is one of the city's most brutal crimes ever.
- December 15 – The Academia de la Llingua Asturiana (Academy of the Asturian language) is created.

== World population ==
World population
	1980	1975		1985	
World	4,434,682,000	4,068,109,000	366,573,000	4,830,979,000	396,297,000
Africa	469,618,000	408,160,000	61,458,000	541,814,000	72,196,000
Asia	2,632,335,000	2,397,512,000	234,823,000	2,887,552,000	255,217,000
Europe	692,431,000	675,542,000	16,889,000	706,009,000	13,578,000
Latin America & Caribbean	361,401,000	321,906,000	39,495,000	401,469,000	40,068,000
Oceania	22,828,000	21,564,000	1,264,000	24,678,000	1,850,000

== Nobel Prizes ==

- Physics – James Watson Cronin, Val Logsdon Fitch
- Chemistry – Paul Berg, Walter Gilbert, Frederick Sanger
- Medicine – Baruj Benacerraf, Jean Dausset, George D. Snell
- Literature – Czesław Miłosz
- Peace – Adolfo Pérez Esquivel
- Economics – Lawrence Klein
