= Clara E. Westropp =

American businesswoman and Catholic activist

Clara E. Westropp (July 7, 1886 – June 25, 1965) was an American businesswoman and Catholic activist.

Westropp was a native of Cleveland, the daughter of Thomas P. and Clara Stoeckel Westropp. She graduated from West High School and Dyke School of Commerce, and also attended the Savings & Loan Institute in Mercersburg, Pennsylvania. With her sister, Lillian M. Westropp, in 1922 she founded a savings and loan association directed and run by women; called the Women's Federal Savings Bank, it was the first such institution in the United States. It was first organized under a state charter, but reorganized under a federal charter in 1935, changing its name in that year to the Women's Federal Savings & Loan Association of Cleveland. The initial stock capitalization as $85,000, over half of which was sold by Clara. On the strength of her previous success, Westropp was named president of the Cuyahoga Savings & Loan League in 1952, becoming the first woman to occupy that position.

Westropp's expertise in financial matters carried over into her religious life when she founded the Francis Xavier Mission Circles in Cleveland in 1946. Each circle was composed of twelve women who through "prayer, sacrifice and funds" developed personal relationships with missionaries from the Roman Catholic Diocese of Cleveland. By 1960 over 250 of these circles existed in the city. The plan was not unique to Cleveland; even so, Westropp influenced the further development of the method in Los Angeles, Detroit, and Chicago. Furthermore, Westropp was friends with Fulton J. Sheen, and underwrote portions of his television programs in the 1950s. By 1961 she had been named diocesan chair of missions; that decade she assisted in inaugurating the Cleveland Latin America Association, which was sponsoring Jean Donovan and Dorothy Kazel in El Salvador at the time of their murder. She was also a member of the National Catholic Welfare Council. For the National Council of Catholic Women she was a diocesan mission chair. Westropp never married; she died in the city of her birth. For many years she and Lillian had shared a home on Southland Avenue.

Westropp's activities brought her numerous honors both during her lifetime and posthumously. She received the papal medal Pro Ecclesia et Pontifice in 1954. In 1965 she was posthumously named Catholic Woman of the Year when she received the Mission Secretarial award. Also posthumously, she became the namesake of Clara E. Westropp Junior High School. Her death was entered into the Congressional Record. Some of her papers, along with those of her sister, are currently housed at Harvard University.
