= Austin E. Ford =

American publisher and Fire Commissioner

Austin Edward Ford

New York City Fire Commissioner
- In office 1895-1896
- Succeeded by: Thomas Sturgis

Personal details
- Born: August 31, 1857 Boston, Massachusetts, U.S.
- Died: September 17, 1896 (aged 39) Manhattan, New York, U.S.
- Cause of death: Appendicitis
- Party: Republican
- Relations: Bishop Francis Xavier Ford, M.M. Sister Ita Ford, M.M.

Austin Edward Ford (August 31, 1857 – September 17, 1896) was an American publisher and Fire Commissioner of New York.

== Biography ==
Austin Edward Ford was born on August 31, 1857, in Boston, Massachusetts, to Ellen and Thomas Irwin Ford. He was editor of the New York Freeman, and was associated with the Irish World, a newspaper run by his uncle, Patrick Ford. As such, he was active in promoting the cause of Irish independence.

Ford moved to Manhattan, where he later ran for New York's 7th congressional district for the United States Congress, losing to the Democratic Party candidate, Franklin Bartlett, in 1894. At the time he lived at 2767 Marion Avenue in what is now the Borough of the Bronx. He was appointed Fire Commissioner in 1895 by fellow Republican, Mayor Strong.

== Death ==
He died in office aged 39 on September 17, 1896, from appendicitis.

== Legacy ==
Ford was a direct ancestral relative of Bishop Francis Xavier Ford, M.M., a missionary killed during the Korean War, as well as Sister Ita Ford, M.M., a missionary murdered in El Salvador in 1980, and businessman William P. Ford, brother of Sister Ita, a lawyer and businessman turned human rights activist.
