= Francis Xavier Ford =

American Roman Catholic bishop in China (1892-1952)

Servant of God Francis Xavier Ford MM
- Bishop Emeritus of Kaying (Meizhou)
- Bishop Ford in 1951
- Installed: April 11, 1946
- Term ended: February 21, 1952
- Other posts: Vicar Apostolic of Kaying (1935–1946)

Orders
- Ordination: December 5, 1917
- Consecration: September 21, 1935 by Bishop James Anthony Walsh, MM

Personal details
- Born: January 11, 1892 Brooklyn, New York, United States
- Died: February 21, 1952 (aged 60) A prison in Guangzhou, China
- Buried: location unknown
- Education: Maryknoll Seminary
- Coat of arms

Styles of Francis X. Ford
- Reference style: The Right Reverend
- Spoken style: Your Excellency
- Religious style: His Excellency
- Posthumous style: Servant of God

Francis Xavier Ford, MM (January 11, 1892 - February 21, 1952) was an American Catholic prelate who served as Bishop of Kaying from 1946 until his death in 1952. He was a member of the Maryknoll Missionaries in China. Because of his torture by the Communist regime and death in prison, he is considered a martyr. His cause for his canonization has begun, granting him the religious title of Servant of God.

== Early life and priesthood ==
Ford was born in Brooklyn, New York, the son of Austin Brendan Ford and Elizabeth Rellihan Ford. He attended Cathedral College in Manhattan. While studying there, he felt a call to respond to the Catholic Foreign Mission Society of America's vision, just founded in 1911 by the Catholic bishops of the United States for overseas service. Upon completion of his high school studies, he was accepted by the Society.

When Ford reported to the Maryknoll seminary in Ossining, New York, on 14 September 1912, he became the first student of the fledgling Maryknoll Society. He was the first person to matriculate in this institution. He was ordained on December 5, 1917, and became one of the first four American Catholic priests to arrive in China in 1918.

== Missionary service ==
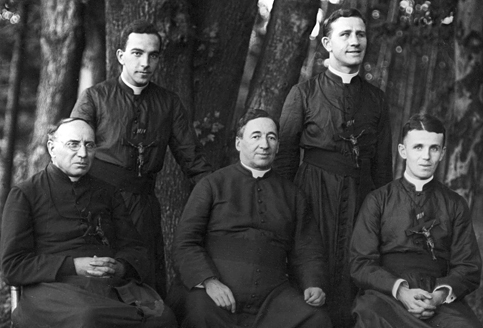
Maryknoll missionaries in 1918, Ford standing at left.

In 1918 Ford began to serve in the province of Canton (Guangdong), in southern China, and in 1921 opened the first Maryknoll mission in China. He was named Prefect Apostolic of a new mission in Kaying (Meizhou) in northern Guangdong in 1925. The Prefecture was raised to the status of a Vicariate Apostolic in 1935, with Ford named as Vicar Apostolic, for which he was appointed the titular bishop of Etenna. He was consecrated a bishop by James Anthony Walsh, the Superior General of the Maryknoll Society, on September 21, 1935.

During twenty years of serving in Kaying, Ford increased his flock from 9,000 to 20,000 and built schools, hostels, and churches. He was chairman of the Chinese Catholic Welfare Conference for Southern China and played an important role in establishing the first overseas convent for the Maryknoll Sisters. When World War II started, Kaying was surrounded by Japanese troops. Nevertheless, Ford remained at his post, aiding Chinese guerrillas, helping downed Allied airmen escape, relieving war refugees in distress. Shortly after the war ended, in April 1946, the vicariate was raised by the Holy See to the status of a full diocese, with Ford appointed as its first bishop.

== Torture and death ==
The victory of the forces of the Chinese Communist Party over the Nationalist forces of General Chiang Kai-shek in October 1949 marked a significant shift in the fate of the Catholic missions. In December 1950, the Communists placed Ford and his secretary, Joan Marie Ryan, under house arrest and charged them with espionage. Though never tried, Ford was taken from his home four months later and publicly paraded, beaten, and degraded in some of the cities he had done mission work in since 1918. His treatment at the hands of the Communists is attested to by Ryan.

In one town, a Communist-orchestrated mob beating was so intense that even Ford's Communist guards fled. Though knocked to the ground repeatedly, Ford continued to walk calmly through the crowd until his guards returned. His neck was bound with a wet rope in another town, which almost choked him as it dried and shrank. Another rope was made to trail from under his gown like a tail. To humiliate them both, the Communists forced Ford to undress before Ryan. The last time she saw Ford alive was in February 1952, just before he died. She reported that his hair had turned completely white, and he was so emaciated that she saw a fellow prisoner carrying him "like a sack of potatoes."

Ford died in prison in Guangzhou on February 21, 1952. He was the first American Roman Catholic bishop and fourth American civilian known to have died in the prisons of the Chinese Communists.

Ford's diocese would have been the first Maryknoll territory to be turned over to the native clergy had the Communists not suppressed the local Catholic community. Ford was Maryknoll's first martyr, and the first to be killed at the hands of Chinese Communists. Ford's remains were never found, having been intentionally scattered by the Chinese Communists. At the time of his death, Ford had been a priest for 34 years and a bishop for 16 years.

== Legacy ==
=== Cause for beatification ===
The public phase of the process began in December 2017 with a Mass to mark the 100th anniversary of the ordination of Bishop Ford. A cause for Ford's beatification was introduced by the Roman Catholic Diocese of Brooklyn. John Vesey, the pastor of St Michael's Catholic Church in Flushing, Queens, is the postulator of the cause.

On July 27, 2011, George Weigel wrote an article for the First Things blog, questioning why Ford has not yet been beatified. Wiegel opined that the process had been put on hold because of Roman authorities' concerns about offending the Chinese government. Weigel further stated that "[persecuted] Catholics [in China] need the encouragement of a witness like that given by Francis Xavier Ford, whose blood may yet prove to have paved the King's Highway in the Middle Kingdom."

=== Family ===
Ford's cousin, Maryknoll sister Ita Ford, was one of four Catholic churchwomen who were tortured, raped and murdered in El Salvador by members of a military death squad on December 2, 1980. She had previously worked with the poor and war refugees as a Maryknoll Sister missionary in Bolivia and Chile.

=== Memorials ===
- In 1952, the Maryknoll Fathers in Hong Kong founded a co-educational primary school and named it Bishop Ford Memorial School (Chinese: 福德學校). The school was the first established by the Maryknoll Fathers in Hong Kong after the Second World War, and is now managed by the Roman Catholic Diocese of Hong Kong.
- In 1962, the Roman Catholic Diocese of Brooklyn named one of its high schools after Ford. Bishop Ford Central Catholic High School was accredited by the Regents of the State of New York and the Middle States Association of Colleges and Schools. It was located in the Park Slope area of Brooklyn. Due to a 75% decline in enrollment between 2006 and 2014, the school closed at the end of the 2013–2014 academic year.

== Bibliography ==
The following are books by Bishop Ford, posthumously published:

- Stone in the King's Highway: Selections from the Writings of Bishop Francis Xavier Ford. New York: McMullen. 1953. OCLC 1124239.
- Come Holy Ghost: Thoughts on Renewing the Earth as the Kingdom of God. Orbis Books. 1976. ISBN 978-0-88344-067-4.

== Biographies ==
- Betz, Eva K. (1953). To Far Places: The Story of Francis X. Ford. New York: Hawthorn Books. OCLC 2940634.
- Donovan, John F. (1967). The Pagoda and the Cross: The Life of Bishop Ford of Maryknoll. New York: Scribner. OCLC 1376571.
