= Choices of the Heart =

1983 film directed by Joseph Sargent

- Genre: Drama
- Written by: John Pielmeier
- Directed by: Joseph Sargent
- Starring: Melissa Gilbert; Martin Sheen; Pamela Bellwood; Mike Farrell; René Enríquez
- Theme music composer: John Rubinstein
- Country of origin: United States
- Original language: English

Production
- Executive producers: Sandy Gallin; John Houseman
- Producers: David W. Rintels; Joseph Sargent
- Production locations: Churubusco Studios, Mexico City, Distrito Federal, Mexico
- Cinematography: Jorge Stahl Jr.
- Editor: George Jay Nicholson
- Running time: 100 minutes
- Production companies: Katz-Gallin Productions; Half-Pint Productions; Metromedia

Original release
- Network: NBC
- Release: December 5, 1983

Choices of the Heart is a 1983 American made-for-television drama film based on the lives of the American Roman Catholic missionaries Jean Donovan, Dorothy Kazel, Maura Clarke and Ita Ford, all of whom were murdered in El Salvador in 1980 during the Salvadoran Civil War. The story primarily focuses on Donovan, played by Melissa Gilbert. The film also depicts the assassination of Salvadoran Archbishop Óscar Romero, which occurred shortly before the women were killed.

== Plot ==
Jean Donovan and Sister Dorothy Kazel meet Sisters Maura Clarke and Ita Ford at the El Salvador airport, and the four pile into a van driven by Jean for the trip back to the mission where Jean and Dorothy live and work. Shortly after leaving the airport, the van is stopped by a group of armed soldiers. The women then go missing and the US Ambassador to El Salvador, Robert E. White, searches for them, eventually finding their bodies in a shallow grave. White's search for the women and then for answers about what happened to them is interspersed with flashbacks of Jean's life.

In college, Jean drinks and parties with her friends during a study abroad year in Dublin, until she is contacted by Father Matt Phelan, a Catholic priest seeking help with his ministry to the local poor. Self-centered and initially uninterested, Jean slowly becomes drawn to helping those in need. Back in the United States, Jean lands a high-paying job with a business consulting firm, allowing her to spend freely on expensive toys such as a new car and a motorcycle, but she soon feels dissatisfied with her hedonistic lifestyle. Although she has begun a serious relationship with medical student Doug Cable, she applies for a Catholic lay missionary program and is sent to El Salvador, where she works with Sister Dorothy to help the local poor.

Jean's assertive manner in standing up against injustice soon draws negative attention from the Salvadoran military, who run the area (with the support of the US government) and harass and intimidate the residents. A mutual romantic attraction develops between Jean and Armando, a local youth who is preparing for the Catholic priesthood. Armando sneaks over to Jean's house in the middle of the night, but Jean, realizing their feelings for each other are wrong, sends him away, only for him to be shot dead by soldiers as he is leaving. The charismatic Archbishop of El Salvador, Óscar Romero, who is loved and admired by the people, is also assassinated by the military for speaking out against their oppressive and violent regime.

Despite Jean's grief and the obvious danger, plus a threat from Doug that he will end their relationship if Jean doesn't come home to the US, Jean cannot bring herself to leave El Salvador, especially when she thinks of the Salvadoran children she has grown to love. Jean's refusal to leave eventually results in a military death squad raping, torturing, and killing her along with the three religious sisters she was driving to the mission house. Ambassador White's attempt to get justice for Jean and her companions is frustrated by lack of cooperation from both the Salvadoran and US governments.

== Cast ==
- Melissa Gilbert as Jean Donovan
- Peter Horton as Douglas Cable
- Helen Hunt as Cathy
- Mary McCusker as Sister Maura Clarke
- Mari Gorman as Sister Ita Ford
- Pamela Bellwood as Sister Dorothy Kazel
- Patrick Cassidy as Patrick
- René Enríquez as Archbishop Óscar Romero
- Mike Farrell as Ambassador Robert E. White
- Martin Sheen as Father Matt Phelan
- Demián Bichir as Armando
- Enrique Lucero as Colonel Rojas
- Delores Devine as Gwen
- George Belanger as Father Rich

== Background ==
The film is based on actual events. On December 2, 1980, a few months after the March assassination of Archbishop Óscar Romero, the three Roman Catholic religious sisters Maura Clarke, Ita Ford and Dorothy Kazel, and the lay Catholic missionary Jean Donovan, were raped, tortured, and murdered by a Salvadoran death squad, possibly funded by the United States. The sisters had dedicated years of their lives to working with refugees and the poor in El Salvador and elsewhere. Donovan had been in El Salvador for over two years helping the poor, especially children, and repeatedly expressed in her letters to her family in the United States that God brought her to El Salvador. Attempts were made by the Salvadoran and American governments to try to cover up the murders.

== Production ==
The production was filmed mostly in Mexico. Mike Farrell plays Robert C. White, then U.S. President Jimmy Carter's Ambassador to El Salvador, who keeps running into official interference and noncooperation in his investigation concerning the murdered women. Martin Sheen appears as Matt Phelan, a Dublin priest whom Donovan (Melissa Gilbert) meets while spending her junior college year in Ireland.
