= Fontbonne Hall Academy =

Private high school in Brooklyn, New York, US

Fontbonne Hall

Location
- 9901 Shore Road; Fort Hamilton, Brooklyn, New York 11209; 40°36′50″N 74°2′11″W

Information
- Type: Private
- Motto: Ex Fide Fortis (From Faith Comes Strength)
- Religious affiliations: Catholic Church; Sisters of St. Joseph
- Established: 1937; 89 years ago
- Principal: Rocco Gentile
- Grades: 6–12
- Gender: Girls
- Colors: Navy and Gray
- Slogan: Women of faith and vision ... building tomorrow TODAY!
- Athletics conference: CHSAA Brooklyn-Queens Section
- Sports: Basketball; cheer; golf; lacrosse; soccer; softball; swimming; tennis; track; volleyball
- Mascot: Elephant
- Nickname: Bonnies
- Rival: Xaverian High School
- Accreditation: Middle States Association of Colleges and Schools
- Newspaper: Folio
- Yearbook: Fountain
- Tuition: $17,000
- Website: www.fontbonne.org

Fontbonne Hall is an all-girls, private, Catholic high school in Brooklyn, New York, United States. Established in 1937 by the Sisters of St. Joseph, it is located within the diocese of Brooklyn.

In 2013, celebrating its 75th year, school leadership noted that throughout its history, Fontbonne had educated nearly 10,000 women who “have become noted doctors, lawyers, engineers, leaders in business and the arts, educators, mothers, and even, like Sister Ita Ford, class of 1957, martyrs for their cause.”

Making reference to the boroughs of New York City, Fontbonne's students predominantly come from southwest Brooklyn, southern Queens, and Staten Island.

== Curriculum ==
Students may earn a Fontbonne Hall Regents Diploma or Fontbonne Hall Advanced Regents Diploma, which requires eight NYS Regents Exams in English, history, mathematics, science and language.

In recent years, the curriculum was expanded to include courses, such as Forensic Science, Child Development, American Sign Language, and Accounting and Law.

=== College Prep ===
The school offers various Advanced Placement courses, including English Language, English Literature, U.S. History, Calculus, Statistics, Biology, Italian and Spanish. Eligible students can also participate in the St. John’s University College Advantage Program (CAP) to earn college credits. CAP courses include English 12, Religious Studies 12, Italian 4, Spanish 4, Pre-Calculus, Calculus, and Anatomy and Physiology.

The school encourages students to pursue academic and career interests, as well as self-improvement and community engagement over summers. Students enroll in leadership and pre-college programs at Boston University, Columbia University, Cornell University, Fordham University, Georgetown University, Long Island University, New York University, Stony Brook University and Vassar College.

=== STEM Programs ===
Fontbonne students participate in the ACE mentor and Manhattan College engineering programs.

Fontbonne students also recently started participating in a STEM Workshop at CUNY Graduate Center and Techweek NYC.

The school is collaborating with St. Francis College and NYU Polytechnic School of Engineering to provide more learning opportunities for students interested in the STEM fields.

== Spiritual life ==
Fontbonne’s culture is tied to the Catholic tradition. At school Masses, students and faculty sing the hymn, “The Servant Song,” to express a spirit of service to other members of the Fontbonne family and to the larger community.

Four years of Religious Studies are required, beginning with the Sacred Scriptures in freshman year and ending with a course in Loving Relationships in senior year. Fontbonne students have a day retreat for three years and an overnight retreat in their last year.

School Masses are held for major holidays, including Easter, Thanksgiving and Christmas, as well as to celebrate Catholic feast days, such as the Feast of St. Joseph.

== Sports ==
Fontbonne offers a wide variety of sports. The school is known for its outstanding basketball, softball, volleyball, and soccer teams who have been champions in their divisions for the last four years. Fontbonne also has a competitive cheerleading team. Four out of 10 students are on athletic teams that compete on the local and state levels. In addition, Fontbonne has tennis, swim, golf, lacrosse, and track teams.

The first Fontbonne student was named to the All-New York City girls' volleyball team selection by MSG Varsity in 2013.

== Notable alumni ==
- Maria Bartiromo, television financial journalist
- Kerry Butler, Broadway and TV actress
- Sister Ita Ford, M.M., missionary
