= 1980 murders of U.S. missionaries in El Salvador =

Murders during Salvadoran Civil War

- Part of Salvadoran Civil War
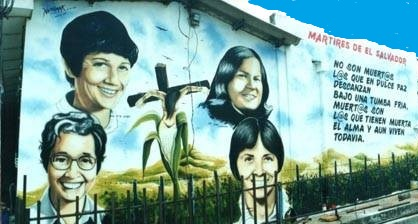
- Mural depicting the missionaries
- Location: Near El Salvador International Airport, El Salvador
- Date: December 2, 1980; 45 years ago
- Attack type: Mass murder, mass rape
- Deaths: 4
- Perpetrator: El Salvador National Guard
- Charges: Murder
- Verdict: Guilty
- Convicted: 5

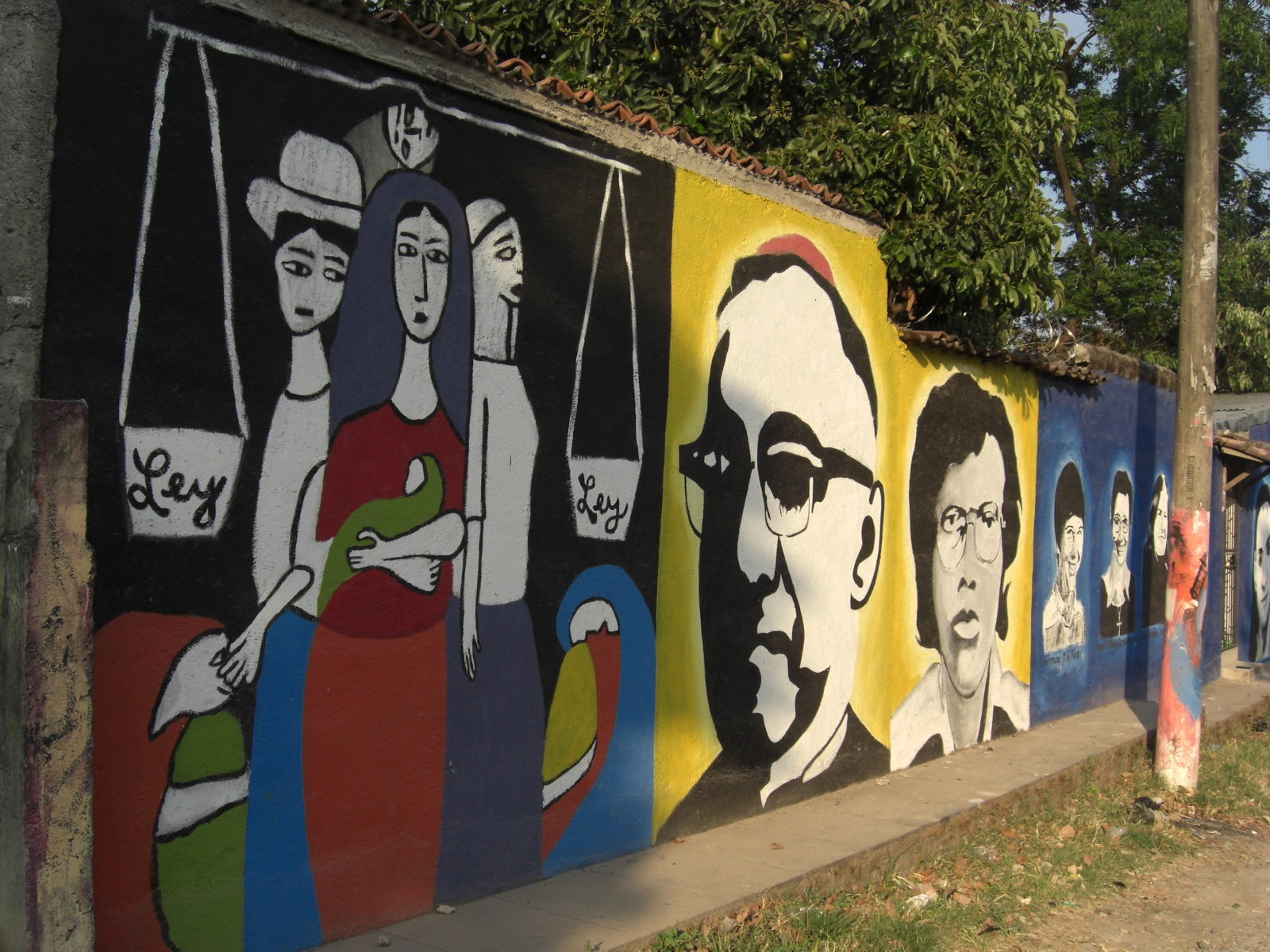
Memorial depicting Oscar Romero and the murdered missionaries.

On December 2, 1980, four female Catholic missionaries from the United States working in El Salvador were raped and murdered by five members of the El Salvador National Guard (Daniel Canales Ramírez, Carlos Joaquín Contreras Palacios, Francisco Orlando Contreras Recinos, José Roberto Moreno Canjura, and Luis Antonio Colindres Alemán). The victims were Maryknoll sisters Maura Clarke and Ita Ford, Ursuline sister Dorothy Kazel and lay missionary Jean Donovan.

== Historical background ==
The Salvadoran Civil War began after the 1979 Salvadoran coup d'état which brought the Revolutionary Government Junta to power. Catholic activists protested against the junta's oppression of impoverished citizens. Óscar Romero, the Archbishop of San Salvador, was assassinated on March 24, 1980, while saying Mass. The four murdered Americans were involved in an international humanitarian aid mission which was accused by the régime of fomenting political opposition.

== Murders ==
Kazel and Donovan, who were based in La Libertad, drove to El Salvador International Airport on the afternoon of December 2 to pick up two Maryknoll Sisters returning from a Maryknoll conference in Managua, Nicaragua. Kazel and Donovan were under surveillance by a National Guardsman at the time, who telephoned his commander. Acting on orders from the commander, five National Guardsmen changed out of uniform and continued to stake out the airport. Donovan and Kazel returned to pick up Clarke and Ford, who were returning from the same conference, on a flight due at 7:00 pm, which landed at 9:11 pm. The five Guardsmen stopped the four women's vehicle after they left the airport. They were taken to a relatively isolated spot where they were beaten, raped and murdered by the soldiers.

Peasants living nearby had seen the women's white van drive to an isolated spot at about 10 p.m. on December 2 and then heard machine gun fire followed by single shots, three hours after the flight was due. They saw five men flee the scene in the white van, with the lights on and the radio blaring. The van would be found later that night on fire at the side of the airport road. Later, the women's bodies with knife wounds were found in a ditch.

Early the next morning, December 3, the peasants found the bodies of the four women and were told by local authorities — a judge, three members of the National Guard, and two commanders — to bury them in a common grave in a nearby field. The peasants did so, but informed their parish priest, Father Paul Schindler, and the news reached Óscar Romero's successor Arturo Rivera y Damas and the United States Ambassador to El Salvador, Robert White.

Their shallow grave was exhumed the next day, December 4, in front of Sisters Alexander and Dorsey, fifteen reporters, several missionaries, and Ambassador White. Donovan's body was the first exhumed; then Kazel's; then Clarke's; and last, that of Ita Ford. On December 5, a Mass of the Resurrection was said by Bishop Arturo Rivera y Damas; and on December 6, the bodies of Jean Donovan and Dorothy Kazel were flown out for burial. Donovan's body was returned to her parents in Sarasota, Florida, while Kazel's was taken back to her hometown of Cleveland, where she was buried in All Souls Cemetery in Chardon, Ohio. The bodies of the Maryknoll sisters, Clarke and Ford, were buried in Chalatenango, El Salvador, in keeping with Maryknoll practice.

== Victims ==
Sister Maura John Clarke was born on January 13, 1931, being the first daughter of Irish immigrants located in Queens, New York. She entered the Maryknoll sisterhood in 1950 and graduated from the Maryknoll teachers college in 1954. She then began to teach at Saint Anthony's Parish school in the Bronx. She took up her first posting in central America in 1959, where she was assigned to teach in Sinua, Nicaragua. In August 1980, she returned to the region, this time ending up in Salvador, where she worked with the poor in a position that she felt was her calling.

Like Sister Maura, Sister Ita Ford was a native of New York. Born in Brooklyn, Ita also joined the Maryknoll sisterhood upon graduating from Marymount College in 1961. She left the order for health reasons, but returned 10 years later in 1971. Two years later, she arrived in Chile and remained there after a military coup overthrew the country's democratically elected Marxist president, Salvador Allende. She went to El Salvador in response to Archbishop Romero's cry for help, arriving shortly after his death in March 1980.

Born June 30, 1939, in Cleveland, Ohio, Sister Dorothy Kazel joined the Ursuline order in 1960. After completing her bachelor's degree in 1965, she spent nine years as a teacher, counselor, and missionary working in Cleveland and Arizona. In 1974, she joined a mission team in El Salvador, where she became known as Madre Dorothea. There, she dedicated herself to victims of the country's civil war, helping communities bury their dead.

The youngest of the four murdered women was a missionary named Jean Donovan. Born in Westport, Connecticut in 1953, Donovan earned a masters degree in business administration from Case Western Reserve university in Cleveland, where is she then embarked on a promising business career. In July 1979, she traveled to El Salvador as part of a mission project, working in the town of Libertad, where she was so beloved by the population that they nicknamed her "St. Jean the Playful." She was present alongside sister Dorothy Kazel during the massacre that occurred in the church during archbishops Romero's funeral. The event affected her deeply and she feared that she would be next.

== Subsequent history ==
As news of the murders was made public in the United States, public outrage forced the U.S. government to pressure the Salvadoran regime to investigate. U.S. President Jimmy Carter suspended aid to El Salvador. The earliest investigations were condemned as whitewash attempts by the later ones, and in time, a Commission on the Truth for El Salvador was appointed by the United Nations to investigate who gave the orders, who knew about it, and who covered it up. Several low-level guardsman were convicted, and two generals were sued by the women's families in the U.S. federal courts for their command responsibility for the incident.

Unlike President Carter, succeeding U.S. President Ronald Reagan favored the Salvadoran military regime; he authorized increased military aid and sent more U.S. military advisers to the country to aid the government in quelling the civil/guerrilla war. The U.S. was pursuing a policy of "containment," in Latin America, which justified overthrowing elected governments by promoting anti-communist propaganda and supporting certain regimes and paramilitary groups. Reagan's foreign policy advisor Jeane Kirkpatrick declared her 'unequivocal' belief that the Salvadorean army was not responsible, adding that "the nuns were not just nuns. They were political activists. We ought to be a little more clear about this than we actually are." After the release of declassified documents in the 1990s, New Jersey congressman Robert Torricelli stated that it was "now clear that while the Reagan Administration was certifying human rights progress in El Salvador they knew the terrible truth that the Salvadoran military was engaged in a widespread campaign of terror and torture".

In El Salvador's Decade of Terror: Human Rights Since the Assassination of Archbishop Romero, Human Rights Watch reports:

During the Reagan years in particular, not only did the United States fail to press for improvements … but, in an effort to maintain backing for U.S. policy, it misrepresented the record of the Salvadoran government, and smeared critics who challenged that record. In so doing, the Administration needlessly polarized the debate in the United States, and did a grave injustice to the thousands of civilian victims of government terror in El Salvador. Despite the El Mozote Massacre that year, Reagan continued certifying (per the 1974 amendment to the Foreign Assistance Act) that the Salvadoran government was progressing in respecting and guaranteeing the human rights of its people, and in reducing National Guard abuses against them.

In 1984, four national guardsmen—Daniel Canales Ramírez, Carlos Joaquín Contreras Palacios, Francisco Orlando Contreras Recinos and José Roberto Moreno Canjura—were convicted of murdering the four women and were sentenced to 30 years in prison. Their superior, sub-sergeant Luis Antonio Colindres Alemán, was also convicted for the murders and received a 30-year sentence.

According to the Maryknoll Sisters:

The [1993] U.N.-sponsored Report of the Commission on the Truth for El Salvador concluded that the abductions were planned in advance and the men responsible had carried out the murders on orders from above. It further stated that the head of the National Guard and two officers assigned to investigate the case had concealed the facts to harm the judicial process. The murder of the women, along with attempts by the Salvadoran military and some American officials to cover it up, generated a grass-roots opposition in the U.S., as well as ignited intense debate over the Administration's policy in El Salvador. In 1984, the defendants were found guilty and sentenced to 30 years in prison. The Truth Commission noted that this was the first time in Salvadoran history that a judge had found a member of the military guilty of assassination. In 1998, three of the soldiers were released for good behavior. Two of the men remain in prison and have petitioned the Salvadoran government for pardons.

The head of the National Guard, General Carlos Eugenio Vides Casanova, went on to become Salvadoran Minister of Defense in the government of José Napoleón Duarte. In 1998, the four assassins confessed to abducting, raping and murdering the four churchwomen and claimed that they did so because Alemán had informed them that they had to act on orders from high-level military officers. Some were then released from prison after detailing how Vides and his cousin Col. Oscar Edgardo Casanova Vejar, the local military commander in Zacatecoluca, had planned and orchestrated the executions of the churchwomen. A 16-year legal battle to deport Vides Casanova soon commenced.

Prior to the women being murdered, a young priest by the name of Jose Alas, was also abducted one night where he was beaten, drugged and left naked at a cliff in the mountains south of San Salvador.

Ita Ford's brother, attorney William P. Ford, spent more than 25 years using the U.S. court system to try to obtain justice for his sister and the other three murdered women. He worked closely with Human Rights First (formerly the Lawyers Committee for Human Rights) on federal lawsuits to try to bring Salvadoran generals to answer for the murder of the women, and, in other cases, for the torture and murder of members of the Salvadoran poor. After their emigration to the U.S. state of Florida, Vides Casanova and his fellow general, José Guillermo García, were sued by the families of the four women in federal civil court. The case is styled Ford v. Garcia. The defense won the case. On February 24, 2012, however, a Federal immigration judge cleared the way for the deportation of Vides Casanova after the General was held liable for various war crimes which occurred under his command. On March 11, 2015, the Board of Immigration Appeals dismissed General Vides Casanova's appeal. Vides Casanova was then deported back to El Salvador on April 8, 2015. On 8 January 2016, American immigration officials deported General García back to El Salvador. The people of El Salvador consider the four murdered women saints; in January 2022, Mass was celebrated in El Salvador at the tomb of Sisters Maura Clarke and Ita Ford by retired Bishop Octavio Cisneros of Brooklyn and Bishop Oswaldo Escobar of Chalatenango, El Salvador. Following the Mass, Bishop Escobar told Catholic News Service that Salvadoran bishops are working on a canonization cause that will include the four women martyrs.

== Cultural depictions ==
Roses in December is a 1982 documentary about the murders, focusing on Jean Donovan. This documentary won the Interfilm Award at the 1982 International Filmfestival Mannheim-Heidelberg.

The dramatization Choices of the Heart won the 1984 Humanitas Prize in the 90-minute television movie category, although it was criticized for lacking clarity about the political context of the women's killings. Clarke, Ford, Kazel and Donovan were played by Mary McCusker, Mari Gorman, Pamela Bellwood, and Melissa Gilbert respectively. Helen Hunt, Martin Sheen, and Mike Farrell co-starred.

The murders were also depicted in Salvador, Oliver Stone's 1986 film about an American reporter trying to cover the overall conflict. In this film, actress Cynthia Gibb portrayed Cathy Moore, a character based on Jean Donovan. Moore is shown in several scenes interacting with the main character.

Points of Arrival: a Jean Donovan journey is a 1996 play written by Paul Amandes, developed by and starring Lisa Wagner and her Still Point Theater Collective, supported by Call to Action.
