= Emusoi Centre =

- Founded: 1999
- Founders: Sister Mary Vertucci
- Type: Non-Profit Organization
- Location: Arusha, Tanzania
- Website: https://www.emusoicentre.co.tz

Emusoi Centre is a centre for young Maasai women in Arusha, Tanzania. Founded in 1999, it is run by Sr. Mary Vertucci, a Maryknoll Sister, with a staff of Tanzanians. As of 2015, the Centre provides a home for 50 young women who are in the pre-secondary program at the Centre and a few other girls taking classes in Arusha town. The Centre also supports close to 300 other Maasai girls who are in boarding school.

The Centre provides board and lodging for the young women, library facilities, tutoring and personal and career counseling for them. "Emusoi" is a Maasai word, which mean "discovery/awareness/realization". The Centre aims to help these young women realize the value of education for themselves and for their community.

== Education ==
EMUSOI Centre was found in 1999 under the leadership of Sr. Mary Vertucci of Maryknoll Sisters of St. Dominic and Anna Shinini; a woman from a pastoral society {Maasai}.At first the centre was located at Sakina in Arusha town. The centre is known as “EMUSOI”, a Maasai word which means discovery /awareness/realization. The centre aims at enabling young women from pastoral societies {The Maasai, Barbaig, Ndorobo, Hadzabe and Wataturu} who complete primary school education to know and realize the meaning, importance and need of education for themselves and their society in this World of Globalization, Science and Technology.

The centre receives young women who have just completed grade seven, and prepares them for placement into different Secondary Schools.

The centre began with six {6} students and currently supports five hundred and forty one {541} students at Pre-secondary, Secondary, Vocational training and Teaching Colleges and University Level.

Most of the students come from the northern regions of Tanzania. Namely: Manyara, Arusha, Morogoro, Bunda, Serengeti, Singida and Kilimanjaro. They all study in more than 50 Secondary Schools, Colleges and Universities within and outside Tanzania.
