= List of Nicaraguan cities by population =

This is a list of cities in Nicaragua by population. This list is based on the urban population of the city, not the total municipality population.

== Cities ==
Rank	City	Department	2023 population
1	Managua	Managua	1,055,111
2	León	León	177,270
3	Tipitapa	Managua	150,597
4	Masaya	Masaya	140,721
5	Ciudad Sandino	Managua	130,357
6	Chinandega	Chinandega	115,687
7	Matagalpa	Matagalpa	114,120
8	Estelí	Estelí	112,132
9	Granada	Granada	106,719
10	Puerto Cabezas	RACCN	86,279

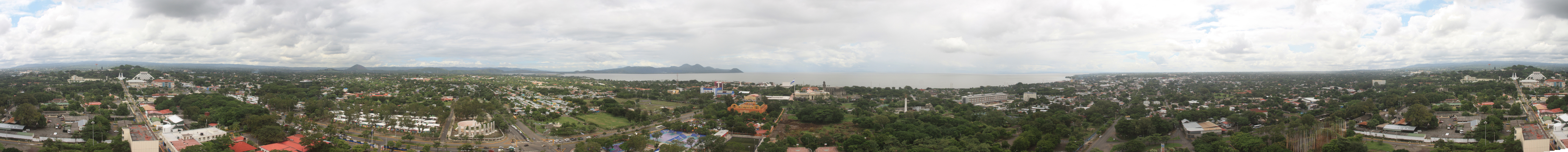
A panoramic view of the capital Managua.
