= CECIM =

The Center for Education and Training in Honor of Sister Maura Clarke (CECIM) (Spanish: Centro de Educación y Capacitación Integral Hna. Maura Clarke), is an education center located in Ciudad Sandino, Nicaragua.

== About ==
The education center has many projects to educate the people of Ciudad Sandino, both children and adults. Cecim gives classes in e.g. sewing, baking, dancing, and thanks to money from a project in Sweden CECIM now offers acting classes.

For many years CECIM has had contact with the Swedish "gymnasium" Angeredsgymnasiet in Gothenburg, Sweden. In different exchange programs, students from Angeredsgymnasiet have visited CECIM, and students from CECIM has visited Angeredsgymnasiet.
