= International Center for Development Policy =

American-based think tank

- Abbreviation: CDP, ICDP
- Type: Public Policy Think Tank
- Location: Washington, D.C., United States

The International Center for Development Policy (ICDP) was a non-profit public policy research and advocacy think tank with offices in Washington, D.C. Its President in the early 1980s was Raul Manglapus, and subsequently Robert White, former US Ambassador to Paraguay and El Salvador.

In the mid-1980s ICDP housed the Commission on U.S.-Central American Relations, which the New York Times described in 1986 as "an arm of the International Center for Development Policy that has become known in recent years as a well-informed source on the Administration's activities in Central America." In late November 1986 the Commission's offices were targeted by a burglary seeking Iran-Contra affair-related documents. ICDP investigator Jack Terrell said one document stolen was a hand-written document from Southern Air Transport, documenting an April 1983 flight supplying the Nicaraguan Contras with small arms. Terrell had given the Times a copy of the document some weeks earlier. Terrell's claims played a significant role in Senator John Kerry's early investigations of Iran-Contra. In responses to requests from two Congressmen, the Justice Department launched an investigation of the burglary in January 1987.

In March 1984 it was reported that ICDP had promised to pay a Salvadoran military figure $50,000 to come to the US to provide evidence on Salvadoran death squads.

In November 1985 most of an ICDP-sponsored delegation to South Africa, including ICDP President White, were refused visas.
