= Robert E. White =

American diplomat (1926–2015)

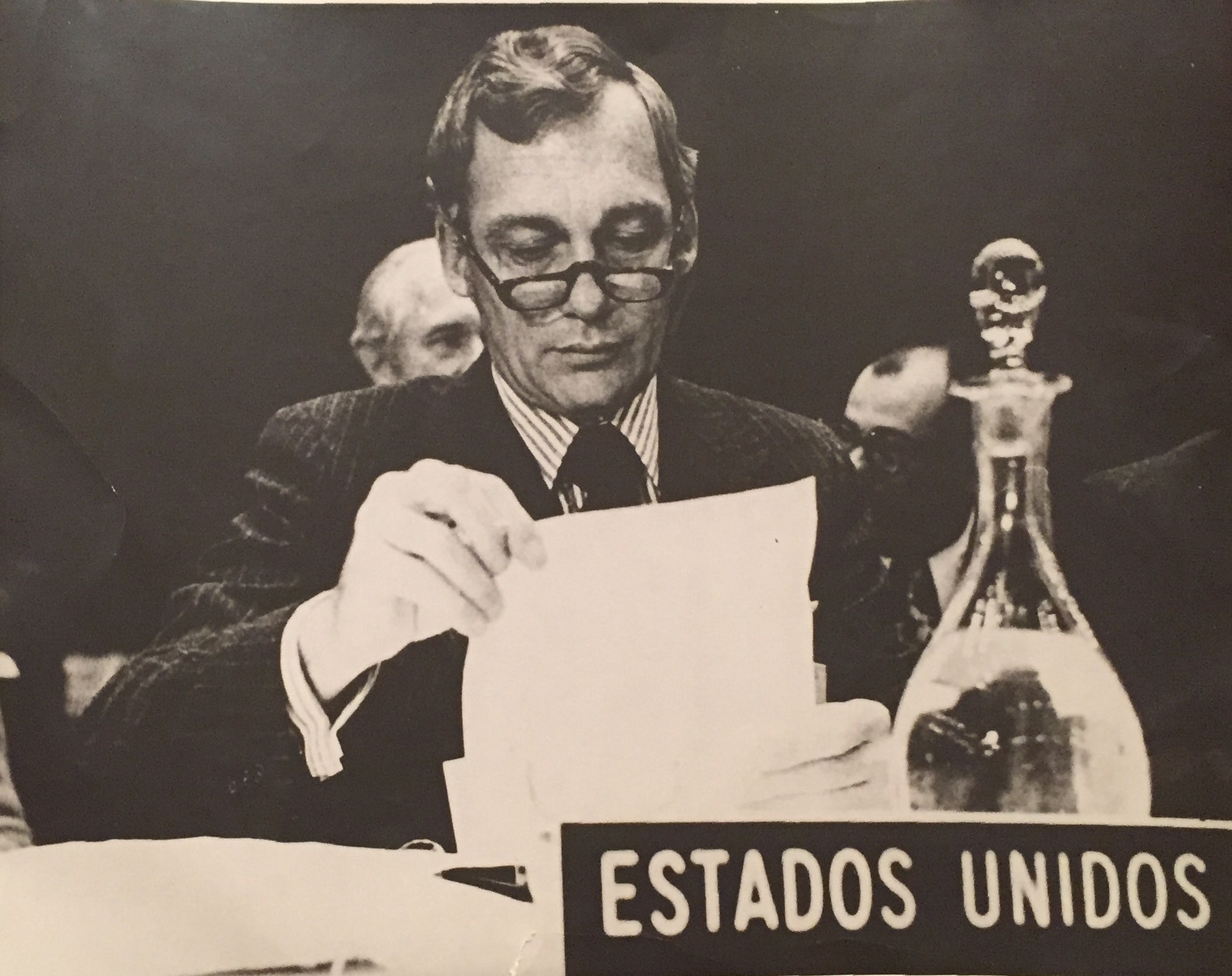

United States Ambassador to Paraguay
- In office November 30, 1977 – January 27, 1980
- President: Jimmy Carter
- Preceded by: George W. Landau
- Succeeded by: Lyle Franklin Lane

United States Ambassador to El Salvador
- In office March 11, 1980 – February 1, 1981
- President: Jimmy Carter
- Preceded by: Frank J. Devine
- Succeeded by: Deane R. Hinton

Personal details
- Born: September 21, 1926 Melrose, Massachusetts, U.S.
- Died: January 14, 2015 (aged 88) Arlington, Virginia, U.S.
- Education: Saint Michael's College
- Occupation: Diplomat

Robert Edward White (September 21, 1926 – January 14, 2015) was an American career diplomat who served as US Ambassador to Paraguay (1977–1980) and to El Salvador (1980–1981). He was recalled from El Salvador by incoming US President Ronald Reagan due to White's opposition to killings committed by the Salvadoran military. He then became president of the Center for International Policy.

== Background and family life ==
He was born in Melrose, Massachusetts. White served in the US Navy from 1944 to 1946, and after the war benefitted from the G.I. Bill. He graduated from Saint Michael's College in 1952, and after a Fulbright Scholarship graduated from The Fletcher School of Law and Diplomacy in 1954.

White died at a hospice on January 14, 2015, aged 88, due to bladder and prostate cancer. He was married to Mary-Anne White and had five children and three grandchildren.

== Career ==
Joining the United States Foreign Service in 1955, White served in a variety of positions at the State Department and in US delegations, primarily in Latin America. Postings included Colombia, Ecuador, Honduras and Nicaragua. From 1968 to 1970 he served as Peace Corps deputy regional director and then regional director, for the Latin America region. From 1975 to 1977 he was Deputy U.S. Permanent Representative to the Organization of American States. In October 1977 he was nominated by President Jimmy Carter as US Ambassador to Paraguay.

In 1992, White provided the Association for Diplomatic Studies and Trainings with an oral history of his various duties in Latin America.

=== Paraguay (1977–1980) ===
==== 1978 cable concerning operation Condor ====
On March 6, 2001, The New York Times reported the existence of a recently declassified 1978 cable from Robert White, at the time the U.S. ambassador to Paraguay. Professor J. Patrice McSherry of Long Island University described the discovery as "another piece of increasingly weighty evidence suggesting that U.S. military and intelligence officials supported and collaborated with Condor as a secret partner or sponsor".

In the cable, Ambassador White relates a conversation with General Alejandro Fretes Dávalos, chief of staff of Paraguay's armed forces, who told him that the South American intelligence chiefs involved in Condor "keep in touch with one another through a U.S. communications installation in the Panama Canal Zone which covers all of Latin America". This installation was "employed to co-ordinate intelligence information among the southern cone countries". White, whose message was sent to Secretary of State Cyrus Vance, was concerned that the US connection to Condor might be revealed during the then ongoing investigation into the deaths of Orlando Letelier and his American colleague, Ronni Moffitt. "It would seem advisable", he suggests, "to review this arrangement to ensure that its continuation is in US interest".

=== El Salvador (1980–1981) ===
By the time White was appointed to be the ambassador in El Salvador, he was already well-known as a promoter of human rights because of his time in Paraguay. He was posted to El Salvador during the first years of that country's brutal 12-year civil war. He was harshly critical of the Salvadorian government and accused the military and paramilitaries (widely alleged to have close ties) of committing widespread atrocities against civilians, many of which were later factually confirmed. He once called prominent military figure Roberto D'Aubuisson a "pathological killer". D'Aubuisson was widely suspected of collaboration with death squad killings including the assassination of Archbishop Óscar Romero. White also accused José Napoleón Duarte, El Salvador's president from 1984 to 1989 of being a CIA asset.

He was dismissed by the new Reagan administration in 1981. He wrote of his ouster:

In 1981, as the ambassador to El Salvador, I refused a demand by the secretary of state, Alexander M. Haig Jr., that I use official channels to cover up the Salvadoran military's responsibility for the murders of four American churchwomen. I was fired and forced out of the Foreign Service.

=== Post-diplomatic career ===
After retiring from the Foreign Service in 1981, White served as a Senior Associate at the Carnegie Endowment for International Peace. He was also Professor of International Relations at Simmons College in Boston, and an election observer in Haiti's 1987 general election. He was at one time President of the International Center for Development Policy, a Washington, D.C.–based think tank.

In 1990, he joined the Center for International Policy as the President and presided at conferences, led delegations to several Latin American and Caribbean countries and published numerous studies regarding U.S. policy towards the region. In 1999, he stated his criticism of U.S. policy:

In the name of anticommunism, U.S.-supported armies suppressed democracy, free speech, and human rights in El Salvador, Honduras, Nicaragua and Panama. Torture and assassination of democratic leaders, including presidential candidates, journalists, priests and union officials became commonplace.

Additionally, White led an ongoing effort to reform U.S. intelligence agencies.

== Awards ==
- St. Michael's Col. Cook award.
- Honorary degree of Doctor of Political Science from Providence College

== In popular culture ==
In the 1983 TV movie dramatizing the murder of the four missionaries Choices of the Heart, Ambassador White is portrayed by Mike Farrell.

In Oliver Stone's 1986 film dramatization of the Salvadoran Civil War, Salvador, the character "Ambassador Tom Kelly" (played by Michael Murphy) is based on Robert White, who appeared in the 62-minute retrospective documentary Into the Valley of Death, which was included on the 2001 DVD release of Salvador. Despite pointing out some of the fictional aspects of Salvador, White was complimentary of Stone's film overall by noting that it captured the pervading sense of doom that surrounded the real-life events. In the documentary, White also re-iterated his criticisms of the activities of US intelligence and the Reagan administration in El Salvador.

Diplomatic posts
| Preceded by George W. Landau | United States Ambassador to Paraguay; 30 November 1977–27 January 1980 | Succeeded by Lyle Franklin Lane |
| Preceded by Frank J. Devine | United States Ambassador to El Salvador; 11 March 1980–1 February 1981 | Succeeded by Deane R. Hinton |
