= Ciudad Sandino =

- Municipality
- Location in Nicaragua
- Coordinates: 12°9′N 86°21′W
- Country: Nicaragua
- Department: Managua

Area
  - Municipality: 19.7 sq mi (51.1 km^{2})

Population (2022 estimate)
  - Municipality: 129,610
  - Density: 6,570/sq mi (2,540/km^{2})
  - Urban: 127,517 (5th Nicaragua)

Ciudad Sandino is a city and municipality in the Managua department of Nicaragua.

Located just outside western Managua, it had an estimated population of 109,644 in mid-2015.

== History ==
The beginning of the foundation of Ciudad Sandino goes back to 1969 when serious floods occurred due to the rise of Lake Xolotlán as a result of a tropical depression in Nicaragua. The neighborhoods adjacent to the coast of the lake such as La Tejera, Miralagos, Quinta Nina, Acahualinca and others were affected by the phenomenon, causing some inhabitants to move to a safer place.

== Notable residents ==
- Yader Cardozo

== See also ==
- CECIM
