= Lillian M. Westropp =

American banker and judge

Lillian Mary Westropp (May 9, 1884 - August 15, 1968) was an American banker and judge.

Westropp was a native of Cleveland, the daughter of Thomas P. and Clara Stoeckel Westropp, and with her sister Clara grew up on the West Side of the city; they were two of nine children in the family. She graduated from West High School and Dyke School of Commerce, and for a short time pursued a career in the theater before enrolling in the law school at Baldwin-Wallace College, from which she graduated in 1915 with a LL.B. She entered private practice with a focus on real estate and finance law; among the first women admitted to the Cleveland Bar Association, she was the first female member of its executive committee. She became an assistant county prosecutor in 1929; the bail bond system which she implemented led to a collection rate of 100%. Appointed in 1931 to fill the seat of a municipal judge, she was reelected consistently until her 1957 retirement. In 1937 she instituted a court psychiatric clinic. With Clara, in 1922 she opened the Women's Federal Savings & Loan Association of Cleveland, the first savings and loan association in the United States to be directed and run by women. Long active in Democratic Party politics, she organized Democratic Women, State of Ohio in 1920, and was appointed to the executive committee of the Cuyahoga County Democratic Party in 1923. Other organizations and entities to which she belonged included the Women Lawyers' Club of Cleveland; the Women's City Club; the League of Women Voters; Catholic Daughters of America; the Cleveland Diocesan Council of Catholic Women; the Business & Professional Women's Club; and Woman's Hospital.

Westropp never married. For years she and Clara shared a home on Cleveland's Southland Avenue. Both were devout Catholics, and they erected a nonsectarian chapel in the bank's offices where they would lead voluntary prayers every morning at 8:30, and at which Mass was offered each Friday. The sisters' papers are held at the libraries of Harvard University.
