= William P. Ford =

American lawyer and bond trader

- Born: April 28, 1936; Brooklyn, New York, United States
- Died: June 1, 2008 (aged 72)
- Education: Fordham University
- Occupations: Bond trader, lawyer
- Relatives: Ita Ford; Austin Ford

William P. Ford (April 28, 1936 – June 1, 2008) was an American lawyer and bond trader. His sister, Ita Ford, a Roman Catholic nun, was one of four nuns murdered in El Salvador. After this, Ford became an advocate for justice for the murder of the nuns and for the people of El Salvador.

== Early life ==
Born in Brooklyn, he graduated from Brooklyn Prep.

== Legal career ==
He graduated from Fordham College in 1960, and later received his law degree from St. John's University. He worked for the law firm of Mudge Rose, and later formed his own firm, Ford Marrin Esposito Witmeyer & Gleser, LLP (www.fmew.com).

He was closely involved with the organization, Human Rights First. He received an honorary doctoral degree from Fordham University in 1990.

As part of a campaign for justice for his sister, he obtained a 54.6 million dollar liability ruling against José Guillermo García and Carlos Eugenio Vides Casanova, who were retired Salvadoran generals living in the United States.
