= Mari Gorman =

American actress

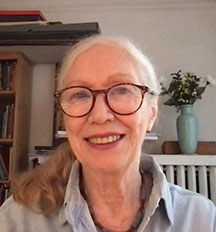
- Born: September 1, 1944 (age 81); New York City, US
- Occupations: Actress, teacher, writer, producer/director

Mari Gorman (September 1, 1944) is an American actress perhaps best known for her work in television, particularly as a frequent guest star on the 1970s and 1980s sitcom Barney Miller, but she is also known for her theater acting. She has won several acting awards, including two Obie Awards. She is the author of Strokes of Existence: The Connection of All Things, which is about a long-term, formal investigation of acting that realizes Shakespeare's words, "All the world's a stage, and all the men and women merely players." (As You Like It, Act II, Sc 7.)

== Biography ==
Gorman had her first professional role in Arnold Wesker's The Kitchen, directed by Jack Gelber, with Rip Torn. She has won Obie Awards for three acting performances: in Walking to Waldheim, by Mayo Simon, directed by George L. Sherman at Lincoln Center; The Memorandum, by Vaclev Havel, directed by Joseph Papp at The Public Theatre; and The Hot L Baltimore, by Lanford Wilson, directed by Marshall W. Mason at The Circle In-the-Square (with Circle Repertory Company), for which she also received the Theatre World Award, Drama Desk Award and Clarence Derwent Award. Other highlights include the lead role of The Girl in The Red Convertible, by Enrique Buenaventura, in the premiere production of The Third Stage (Tom Patterson Theatre) at Stratford Shakespeare Festival, Ontario; the role of Pam in the American premiere of Saved by Edward Bond, with the Yale Repertory Theatre; and the role of Kathy in the world premiere of Moonchildren (originally titled Cancer) by Michael Weller at The Royal Court Theatre in London.

Her first major TV role was as murder victim and mob pawn Taffy Simms on the television soap opera The Edge of Night in the 1970s. She also had a regular role in the Barbara Eden sitcom Harper Valley PTA, playing PTA member, Vivian Washburn, and was a frequent guest star on the 1970s and 1980s sitcom Barney Miller, including as an amateur prostitute housewife (in Season 4, Episode 3, "Bugs") and as a police detective with a jealous husband (in Season 4, Episode 18, "Wojo's Problem," and other episodes). She has had numerous recurring or guest starring roles in many other television shows, and her film career has included roles in Goodbye, Columbus (1969), The Taking of Pelham One Two Three (1974), Family (1977), 10 (1979), Oh, God! Book II (1980), and such made-for-television movies as Curse of the Black Widow (1977), Choices of the Heart (1983) and Kids Don't Tell (1985).

She has produced and directed theatre in New York and Los Angeles as well as teaching acting. In 1981 (in Los Angeles) and 2003 (in New York), she produced and directed Cries for Peace, composed of firsthand accounts of Hiroshima and Nagasaki atomic bomb survivors performed by multi-ethnic casts. In 2010 she founded the New York City theater company, Glass Beads Theatre Ensemble, and produced and directed playwright Michael Locascio's Lily of the Conservative Ladies, at the June Havoc Theatre. She produced, directed, and, with Danna Call and Craig Pospisil, co-wrote Browsing, performed as part of the 2011 New York International Fringe Festival.

== Awards ==
- 1967–68 season Obie Award for Distinguished Performances in Walking to Waldheim (Note: Walking to Waldheim: by Mayo Simon, directed by George L. Sherman at Lincoln Center, New York, NY) and The Memorandum. (Note: The Memorandum: by Václav Havel, directed by Joseph Papp at The Public Theater, New York, NY)
- 1972–73 Obie Award for Distinguished Performance in The Hot l Baltimore (Note: The Hot l Baltimore: by Lanford Wilson, directed by Marshall W. Mason at the Circle in the Square Theatre, Circle Repertory Company, New York, NY)
- 1972–73 Theatre World Award for The Hot l Baltimore
- 1972–73 Drama Desk Award for Outstanding Performance in The Hot l Baltimore
- 1973 Clarence Derwent Award, The Hot l Baltimore
- Drama-Logue Award, director, Vanities. (Note: Vanities: By Jack Heifner, Pilot II Theater, Los Angeles, California)
