= Stella Maris High School =

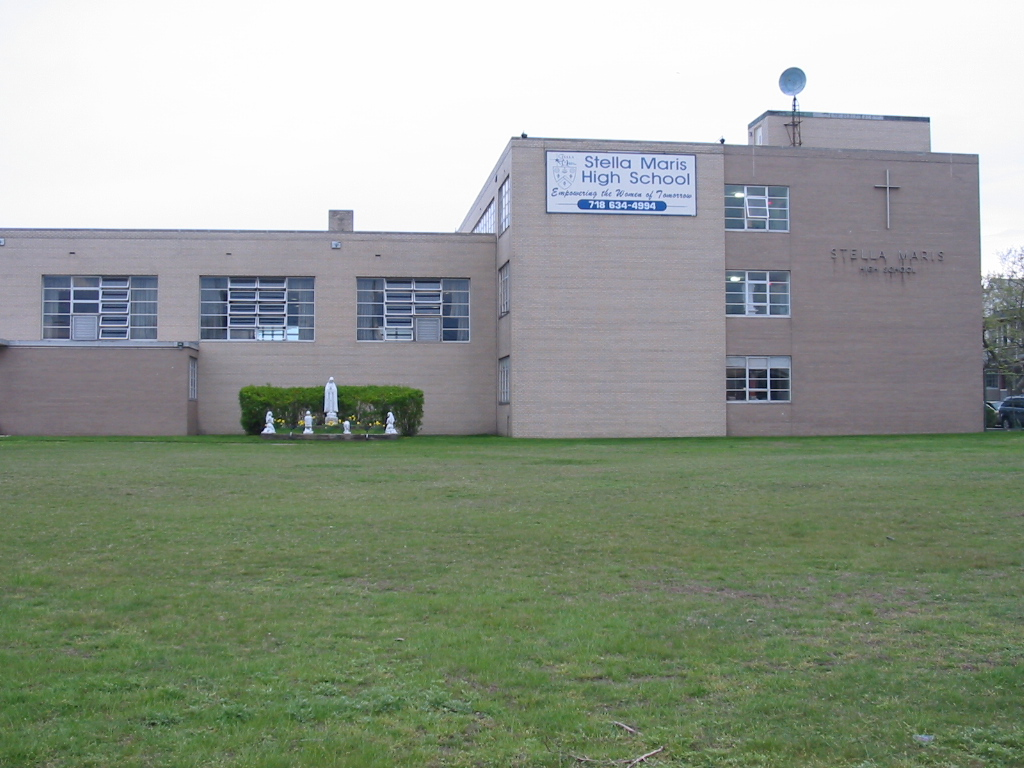
- View of the school

Location
- 140 Beach 112th Street; New York City (Rockaway Park, Queens), New York 11694; United States; 40°34′47″N 73°49′58″W

Information
- Type: Private, All-Female
- Religious affiliations: Roman Catholic; Sisters of Saint Joseph
- Established: 1943
- Closed: 2010
- School code: SM
- Principal: Miss. Geri Martinez
- Grades: 9-12
- Colors: Blue and Gold
- Slogan: A small school where big things happen.
- Team name: Flippers
- Accreditation: Middle States Association of Colleges and Schools
- Publication: Sandprints (literary magazine)
- Newspaper: The Beacon
- Tuition: $7,100 (2008-2009)
- Athletic Director: Kevin McCarthy
- Website: http://www.stellamarishs.org (archived version)

Stella Maris High School was an all-girls, private, Roman Catholic high school on the Rockaway Peninsula in Queens, New York. It was in the Roman Catholic Diocese of Brooklyn. The highlight event of this school was "Blue And Gold," a school spirit event where the freshmen and seniors competed against the sophomores and juniors in a series of events. This school overlooked the Atlantic Ocean.

== Background ==
Stella Maris was established in 1943, by the Sisters of St. Joseph.

The school had an estimated 500 students coming from all over the peninsula. The teacher-to-student ratio was one teacher to every twelve students. The tuition fee was $7,300 per year. Stella Maris was affiliated with Adelphi University and St. John's University for fifteen credits. In the high school was a junior high school called Maura Clarke Junior High School Program. This program closed in 2008.

It was announced in October 2009, that Stella Maris HS would close in June 2010 due to low enrollment.
