= Maryknoll Sisters =

Catholic missionary order

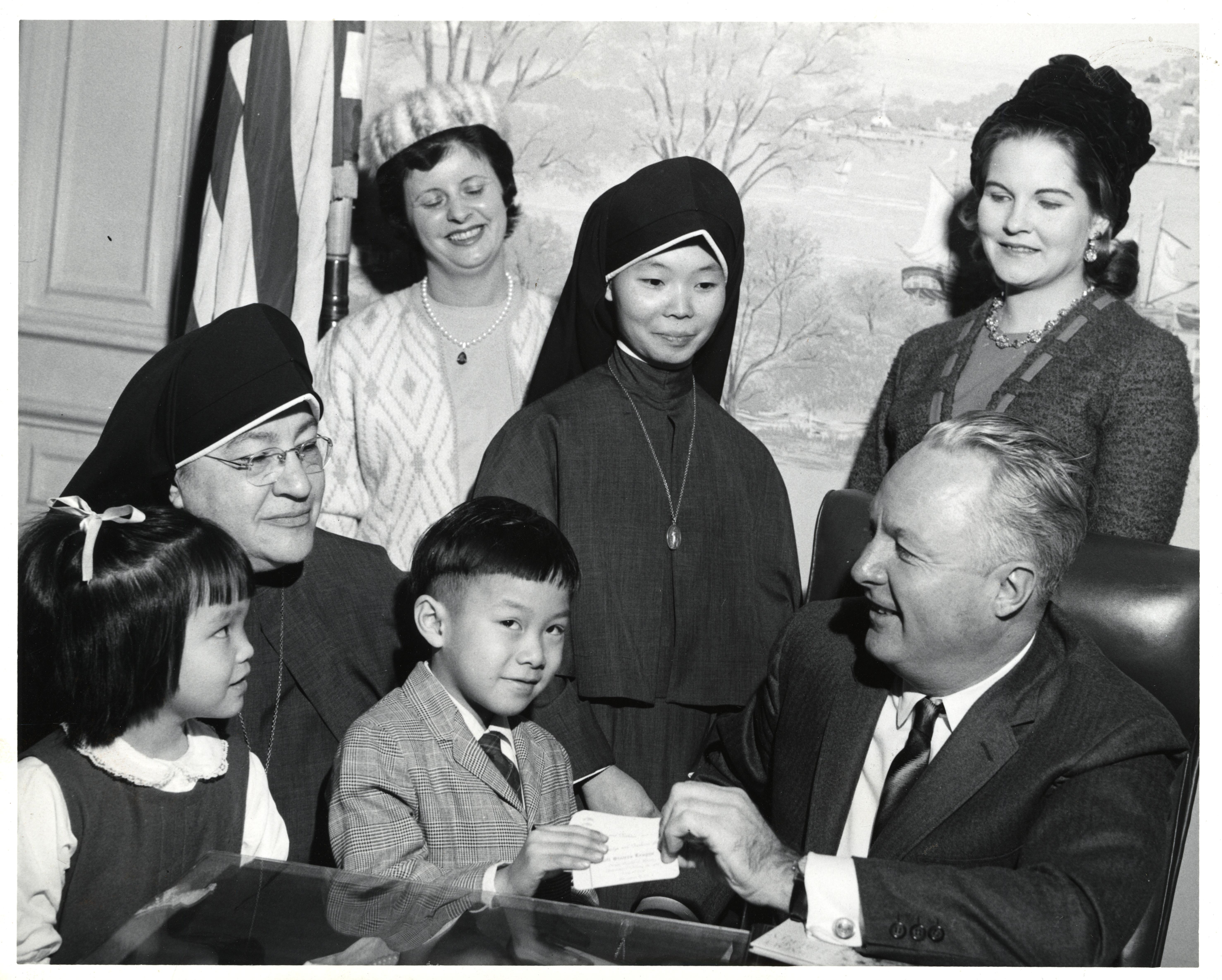
- Two Maryknoll Sisters with John F. Collins, mayor of Boston, in the 1960s
- Abbreviation: M.M.
- Formation: 1912; 114 years ago
- Founders: Mary Joseph Rogers
- Type: Religious Congregation (for Women)
- Headquarters: P.O. Box 317, Maryknoll, NY 10545-0317
- Key people: Teresa Hougnon, President

The Maryknoll Sisters (formerly the Maryknoll Sisters of St. Dominic/Teresians) are an institute of Catholic religious sisters founded in the village of Ossining, Westchester County, New York, in 1912, six months after the 1911 creation of the Maryknoll community of missionary brothers and fathers. Until 1954, when they became a pontifical institute, the religious institute was known as the Foreign Mission Sisters of St. Dominic. The sisters use the suffix "MM" after their names.

== History ==
The institute was founded in 1912 by Mother Mary Joseph (née Mary Josephine "Mollie" Rogers), from Jamaica Plain, Massachusetts, a graduate of Smith College (1905). In 1914 one of the Teresians' earliest benefactors, Julia Ward, took Rogers to Europe. They visited Our Lady of Lourdes in France and Vatican City. This was Roger's first experience of the European Catholic approach religious congregation devoted specifically to foreign mission work. Having only been exposed to Protestant missionary attitudes at Smith College, Rogers had patterned the Teresians on that model: active, practical, and pious.

The first group of sisters went to Los Angeles and Seattle in 1914 to work among the children of Japanese immigrants. In 1920, Patrick Joseph Hayes, Archbishop of New York, granted the sisters canonical approval as a diocesan religious community; they became known as "the Foreign Mission Sisters of St. Dominic" in recognition of the religious formation they have received from the Dominican Sisters of Sinsinawa.

The early missionaries concentrated in East Asia, particularly China (1921) and Korea (1922). World War II interrupted their work. Many Sisters were detained and deported, and two lost their lives. However, numerous South American countries were added as mission sites. Maryknoll Sisters also responded to the needs of refugees in Central America, Africa and Asia.

In 1954, the community became a congregation of pontifical right and changed its name to the "Maryknoll Sisters of St. Dominic". During the 1950s, the sisters produced Crusade - The Story of the Bible Retold for Catholic, a soft covered series of Bible stories for children.

== Present day ==
As of 2023, approximately 300 women serve in 18 countries. The sisters profess the evangelical counsels and devote their lives in service overseas. They continue to serve in Hong Kong.

They work in a variety of fields including medicine, communications, education, agriculture, social services and spiritual formation. In North Carolina they operate Helping Hand Developmental Center for pre-schoolers, and St. Gerard House for people affected by autism.

In 1930, at the invitation of Archbishop John Joseph Cantwell, the order purchased a tuberculosis sanatorium in Monrovia, California in order to treat Asian tuberculosis victims within the Archdiocese of Los Angeles. The sanatorium was replaced with a modern hospital during the 1950s. In the 1970s the campus was converted into a residence for the order's retirees during the 1970s. The sisters remain active in a variety of ministries. As of 2021, a portion of the six acre site has been put to use by a local non-profit to start a tree-nursery and community garden.

In 2012 the Maryknoll Sisters set aside 42 acres of their 67-acre campus in Ossining, New York as a conservation easement which includes both native woodlands and wetlands.

== Martyrs ==
- Maura Clarke, Maryknoll martyr in the 1980 murders of U.S. missionaries in El Salvador
- Ita Ford, Maryknoll martyr in the 1980 murders of U.S. missionaries in El Salvador

== Schools ==
Some of the schools the sisters founded are Maryknoll Convent School in Kowloon, Hong Kong; and Holy Spirit School (later Maryknoll Sisters' School, now Marymount Secondary School) in Happy Valley, Hong Kong.

- Maryknoll School opened in 1927 in Honolulu, Hawaii.
- Maryknoll College, (now Miriam College) primarily a women's school, was founded in 1953 in the eastern edge of Diliman (now Loyola Heights), in Quezon city, Philippines. It evolved from the original Malabon Normal School, now St. James Academy.
- Maryknoll Academy, (now Maryhill College) a co-educational primary and secondary school, was founded in 1938 initially name as Lucena Catholic School in the heart of Lucena (near St. Ferdinand Cathedral Parish), in Quezon Province, Philippines. Management of the school was handed over to the lay administration in 1976 and later renamed as Maryhill Academy and in 1996 the status of the school changed from Academy to College upon the opening of Higher Education Department now owned and managed by the Roman Catholic Diocese of Lucena
- Maryknoll Convent School in Baguio City which was renamed to Marishan School in 1977 was a co-educational primary school since 1933. (reference: )

== See also ==
- Maryknoll (sisters, priests, brothers, and lay missioners)
- Emusoi Centre, founded by a Maryknoll Sister
