= Maura Clarke =

American Catholic Maryknoll sister (1931–1980)

Maura Clarke M.M.
- Born: Mary Elizabeth Clarke; January 13, 1931; The Bronx, New York City
- Died: December 2, 1980 (aged 49); El Salvador
- Cause of death: Murder by military death squad
- Resting place: Chalatenango, El Salvador
- Education: Stella Maris High School; Maryknoll Teachers College
- Occupation: Maryknoll Sister

Maura Clarke, MM (January 13, 1931 – December 2, 1980), was an American Maryknoll Sister who served as a missionary in Nicaragua and El Salvador. She worked with the poor and refugees in Central America from 1959 until her murder in 1980. On December 2, 1980, she was beaten, raped, and murdered along with three fellow missionaries — Ita Ford, Dorothy Kazel and Jean Donovan — by members of the military of El Salvador.

== Early life and education ==
Mary Elizabeth Clarke was born in Fordham Hospital to Irish Catholic immigrant parents John and Mary Clarke. Her father was a member of the Irish Republic Army, which inspired her from a young age to fight oppression. At age two, Clarke, her parents, and newborn brother moved to Rockaway, Queens. There, Clarke grew up in majority-Catholic neighborhoods, moving frequently as landlords raised rent prices in the summer. She attended the schools of St. Camillus, St. Francis de Sales School in Belle Harbor, and Stella Maris. After graduating from Stella Maris, she took classes at St. Francis College.

Clarke became interested in missionary work as a teenager, in part excited by the idea of travel and adventure. While at Stella Maris, she joined the school's Catholic Students' Mission Crusade.

== Maryknoll work ==
In 1950, at age 19, Clarke decided to join the Maryknoll Sisters. She became a postulant on September 6, 1950. Clarke initially struggled as a postulant, desiring to serve a community rather than follow monastic rules. As a novitiate, she studied education at the Maryknoll Teachers College. She took her first vows in 1953. After graduating from Maryknoll Teachers College in 1954, she taught in the Bronx.

In 1959, Clarke was assigned to Siuna, a remote location on Nicaragua's Atlantic coast. There, she assisted in running the local church, hospital, and school. In 1962, Clarke became sister superior of the mission in Siuna. That year also marked the end of the Second Vatican Council, which shifted the Maryknoll sisters work from simple charity work to community organizing. Clarke was in favor of the shift, and encouraged the increasing engagement with the communities the sisters served. In 1970, Clarke began working in Managua, becoming involved in the protests being organized in the city's slums. She provided support to student protesters and hunger strikers, among others. In 1972, after a devastating earthquake hit the country, Clarke supported refugees in protesting for better living conditions within refugee camps. She participated in the "occupation of the Nicaraguan consulate to the United Nations". For Clarke, liberation theology had merged the political and religious.

Clarke returned to the United States in 1976, where she served on a Maryknoll Sisters World Awareness Team, educating other nuns on the political landscape in Nicaragua and the U.S.'s involvement with the Nicaraguan government and its crimes. After three years in the U.S., Clarke returned to Nicaragua in 1980. With the Nicaraguan Somoza regime fully removed from power, Clarke decided to move on to another country rather than to continue to work in Nicaragua, noting "we’ve won here. They still haven’t won in El Salvador".

Clarke came to El Salvador in August 1980, first working in Santa Ana. Her work in El Salvador was influenced by Archbishop Oscar Romero, assassinated earlier that year, who asked that nuns join the struggle of parishioners against dictatorial regimes. After her first few weeks in the country, she joined Ita Ford in working in the northern mountains of Chalatenango, at that point the "frontlines of the war". Her early work in leading prayer meetings evolved to work in distributing food and supplies to farmers and peasants. She also worked to help targeted individuals flee to the cities and to file records on human rights violations.

In November 1980, Clarke returned briefly to Nicaragua for a Maryknoll meeting. There, in light of worsening conditions in El Salvador, Maryknoll began to discuss evacuating Clarke and fellow missionaries Ita Ford, Dorothy Kazel, and Jean Donovan; all four refused.

== Murder ==
In early December 1980, Clarke and Ita Ford returned to El Salvador from Nicaragua, where they had been attending a Maryknoll meeting. Dorothy Kazel, and Jean Donovan met the two at the airport. On December 2, while returning from the airport, the four were attacked by the military.

== Legacy ==
A mass is held in Rockaway annually in honor of Clarke. In St. Francis de Sales Church, stained glass windows depicting Clarke were installed.

== See also ==
- Maryknoll Sisters of St. Dominic
- Death squad
- Los Horcones massacre
- CECIM
