= Jean Donovan =

American lay missionary

- Born: April 10, 1953; Westport, Connecticut
- Died: December 2, 1980 (aged 27); El Salvador
- Cause of death: Murdered by military
- Resting place: Florida, United States
- Known for: Catholic martyr of El Salvador

Jean Marie Donovan (April 10, 1953 – December 2, 1980) was an American lay missionary who was beaten, raped, and murdered along with three fellow missionaries—Ita Ford, Maura Clarke and Dorothy Kazel—by members of the military of El Salvador in 1980.

== Early life ==
Jean Donovan was born to Patricia and Raymond Donovan, who raised her in an upper middle-class home in Westport, Connecticut. She had an older brother, Michael. She attended Mary Washington College in Virginia (now the University of Mary Washington), and spent a year as an exchange student in Ireland at University College Cork, deepening her Catholic faith through her contact with a priest there who had been a missionary in Peru.

Upon the completion of her master's degree in business from Case Western Reserve University, she accepted a position as a management consultant for the Cleveland branch of the nationwide accounting firm, Arthur Andersen.

Donovan was engaged to a young physician, Douglas Cable, and felt a strong call to motherhood as well as her call to do mission work: "I sit there and talk to God and say 'Why are you doing this to me? Why can't I just be your little suburban housewife?'

While volunteering in the Cleveland Diocese Youth Ministry with the poor, she decided to join the Diocesan Mission Project in El Salvador. She was accepted into and completed the lay-missionary training course at Maryknoll in New York State.

Donovan traveled to El Salvador in July 1977, where she worked as a lay missioner in La Libertad, along with Dorothy Kazel, an Ursuline nun. The pair worked in the parish of the Church of the Immaculate Conception in La Libertad, providing help to refugees of the Salvadoran Civil War and the poor. They provided shelter, food, transportation to medical care, and they buried the bodies of the dead left behind by the death squads.

Donovan was a follower of Archbishop Óscar Romero, and often went to his cathedral, the Catedral Metropolitana de San Salvador, to hear him preach. After his assassination on March 24, 1980, about eight months before their own murders, she and Sister Dorothy Kazel stood beside his coffin during the night-long vigil of his wake.

In the weeks before she died, Donovan wrote a friend:

The Peace Corps left today and my heart sank low. The danger is extreme and they were right to leave. ... Now I must assess my own position, because I am not up for suicide. Several times I have decided to leave El Salvador. I almost could, except for the children, the poor, bruised victims of this insanity. Who would care for them? Whose heart could be so staunch as to favor the reasonable thing in a sea of their tears and loneliness? Not mine, dear friend, not mine.

== Legacy ==
Jean Donovan has been portrayed multiple times in fictional media, most notably in the 1986 American war drama film Salvador by actress Cynthia Gibb, and in the 1983 American made-for-television drama film Choices of the Heart, where she is portrayed by actress Melissa Gilbert.

In 2018, Paul Baumann of LaCroix International revealed that he had recently discovered that he had been Jean Donovan's classmate in high school, and he shared that while he had no memory of her personally, upon looking into the old history of his school he was surprised to find that Donovan had been in numerous sports teams, extracurricular activities, Girl Scouts, an equestrian club and volunteer work; Baumann also noted that she had a bronze memorial that he had come upon at his childhood church, the Church of the Assumption in Westport, Connecticut, and that a documentary film had been made of her life that he had recently seen.

The Ignatian Center for Jesuit Education offers the Jean Donovan Fellowship, a financial award of US$3,000 "in grant funding to recipients who work a minimum of 35-40 hours/week with a non-profit organization." According to Ignatian Center, speaking on Donovan's character, "Jean Donovan [was] an American woman who lived, worked, and died in solidarity with the impoverished and oppressed of El Salvador in the 1980s." Jesuits have regularly made note of Jean Donovan's legacy since her death, noting particularly her inspiration to Christian youth and her devotion to helping people in struggling nations. Friar Liam Power of The Association of Catholic Priests, in 2020, released a sermon titled "‘They Don’t Shoot Blond, Blue-Eyed Americans’:Remembering Jean Donovan on the 40th Anniversary of her Martyrdom." The sermon described the Friar's own personal friendship with Donovan, and the horror he had felt upon knowing what had happened to her, but ended on a positive note, as he stated, "her [Donovan's] death was not in vain. Her martyrdom has profoundly influenced my own ministry, awakening me to the intrinsic connection between the struggle for justice and the mission of the Church. She has inspired countless young Christian missionaries and activists who support the struggle for justice in third world countries. The murders of Jean and of her three companions jolted the American public and led to strong debate about foreign policy in Central America and government support for repressive regimes." The sermon was later published in full English text for free on the website for The Association of Catholic Priests. Margaret Swedish, writing for America: The Jesuit Review in 2020, described Donovan as having "a big heart and a yearning for meaning in her life beyond the privilege in which she had been raised."

In 2022, Maryknoll Lay Missioners published a blog post to their official website discussing Donovan's charity work and her legacy, stating, "Jean was only 27 years old when she was murdered, but her legacy has continued for over 40 years in the lives and witnesses of the Maryknoll lay missioners who are either currently serving similar populations [to the El Salvadorians] in need, or have returned after a period of mission." They noted that Jean's time in El Salvador had been chaotic, but that she wanted to stay for the sake of helping children, quoting her as writing in a letter home to her friend, "Who would care for them [the children]? Whose heart would be so staunch as to favor the reasonable thing in a sea of their tears and helplessness? Not mine, dear friend, not mine." Maryknoll Lay Missioners also shared that Donovan had acquired a beloved nickname from the local farmers in El Salvador: "St. Jean the Playful", an affectionate moniker to reference Donovan's love for children.
