= Ita Ford =

American Catholic Maryknoll Sister

Ita Ford MM
- Born: April 23, 1940; Brooklyn, New York
- Died: December 2, 1980 (aged 40); El Salvador
- Cause of death: Murder by military death squad
- Resting place: Chalatenango, El Salvador
- Occupation: Maryknoll Missionary Sister
- Parent(s): William P. Ford, Sr., & Mildred Teresa O'Beirne
- Relatives: William P. Ford, Jr., (brother) & Bishop Francis Xavier Ford, M.M.

Ita Ford, M.M. (April 23, 1940 – December 2, 1980) was an American Maryknoll Sister who served as a missionary in Bolivia, Chile and El Salvador. She worked with the poor and war refugees. On December 2, 1980, she was beaten, raped, and murdered along with three fellow missionaries — Dorothy Kazel, Maura Clarke and Jean Donovan — by members of the military of El Salvador.

== Life and work ==
Born in Brooklyn, New York, on April 23, 1940, Ford was the daughter of William Patrick Ford, an insurance man who took early retirement due to tuberculosis, and Mildred Teresa O'Beirne Ford, a public-school teacher. She had an older brother, William P. Ford (1936–2008) and a younger sister, Irene. The family lived in Brooklyn. William Patrick Ford was related to Austin B. Ford, whose son, Francis Xavier Ford (1892–1952), was the first seminarian to apply to the newly established Maryknoll Fathers in 1911 and, after being ordained as a missionary in 1917, went to China, where he became a bishop and a martyr. He died in a Communist prison camp there in 1952, when his young "cousin" Ita was twelve.

Although her mother taught in the public school system, Ita Ford was educated in parochial schools, beginning at age five in the Visitation Academy in Bay Ridge, run by the Visitation Sisters, a semi-cloistered order. She attended Fontbonne Hall Academy, a high school operated by the Sisters of St. Joseph, where she worked on the school newspaper. Finally, from 1957 to 1961, she attended Marymount Manhattan College, founded by the Religious of the Sacred Heart of Mary. (Marymount Manhattan split from its mother school, Marymount College, in 1961). Following in her relative the Bishop's footsteps, Ford had confided in a high school friend at the age of fifteen that she not only wanted to be a nun, she specifically felt called to be a Maryknoll missionary sister. Even before her college graduation in 1966, Ford had a vocational counselor advising her about her fitness for Maryknoll. She entered the Maryknoll Sisters of St. Dominic at the age of twenty-one. Entering religious life had been difficult, she described it as lonely in an inner sense. Three years later, out of concern for her personal health, she had to leave the formation program.

After working seven years as an editor at Sadlier Publishers, Ford reapplied and was again accepted by the Maryknoll Sisters in 1971. After serving briefly in Bolivia in 1972, she moved to Chile a short time before the military coup, during a time of chaos, there on September 11, 1973. Ford lived in a poor shantytown with Sister Carla Piette, M.M., in Santiago, where they ministered to the needs of the people, especially those who lived in poverty. Her time in Chile had a big effect on her. It was here that she learned what was expected of her in helping the poor.

After spending a required "reflection year" in the United States, 1978–1979, before taking permanent religious vows in March 1980, Ford moved with Piette from Chile to El Salvador, arriving the day of Óscar Romero's funeral. In June of that year, they began working with the Emergency Refugee Committee in Chalatenango. In this mission, Ford worked with the poor and war victims, providing food, shelter, transportation and burial.

Ita and sister Carol knew the dangers they were putting themselves in by feeding the homeless in an oppressive society. Even with that knowledge Ita continued to help feed the homeless.

After the death of Sister Carol in a flash flood on August 23, 1980—a flood which nearly cost Ford her own life, saved only by Piette's help in pushing her from the overwhelmed vehicle. The death of Carol had a lasting impact on Ita. She wondered why she had lived when her friend had not. Ford was joined on the mission by Maura Clarke, a Maryknoll sister who was already in El Salvador in contemplation of a mission assignment. Altogether, Piette and Ford had worked together in Chile and El Salvador for seven years, until their deaths barely three months apart on December 2, 1980.
