= Dorothy Kazel =

Catholic missionary raped and murdered by the military of El Salvador

Sister Dorothy Kazel OSU
- Born: Dorthea Lu Kazel; June 30, 1939; Cleveland, Ohio
- Died: December 2, 1980 (aged 41); El Salvador
- Cause of death: Murder
- Other names: Sister Laurentine, Madre Dorthea
- Occupations: Ursuline Religious Sister and missionary
- Known for: Catholic martyr of El Salvador
- Parent(s): Joseph and Malvina Kazel

Dorothy Kazel, OSU (June 30, 1939 – December 2, 1980), was an American Ursuline religious sister and missionary to El Salvador. On December 2, 1980, she was beaten, raped, and murdered along with three fellow missionaries – Maryknoll Sisters Ita Ford, Maura Clarke and laywoman Jean Donovan – by members of the military of El Salvador.

== Life and work ==
Kazel was born Dorthea Lu Kazel to Lithuanian American parents, Joseph and Malvina Kazel, in Cleveland, Ohio. When she joined the Ursulines, a Roman Catholic religious institute in 1960, she took the name Sister Laurentine, in honor of an Ursuline nun martyred during the French Revolution.

As the Catholic Church modernized during the 1960s, she became known as Sister Dorothy. In the Central American community where she died, she was known as Madre Dorthea (Dorothy).

Kazel completed her bachelor's degree and novitiate between 1960 and 1965. Beginning in 1965, she taught for seven years in Cleveland, and did missionary work among the Papago Tribe of Arizona. Between 1972-1974, Kazel served as a guidance counselor at Beaumont School, in Cleveland Heights, Ohio.

After finishing a master's degree in counseling in 1974, Kazel decided to partake in the challenge of joining the Diocese of Cleveland's mission team working in El Salvador. Once there, Kazel worked in the Church of the Immaculate Conception in La Libertad, training catechists, carrying out sacramental preparation programs, and overseeing the distribution of Catholic Relief Services aid and food supplies. She was also engaged in working with refugees from the Salvadoran Civil War, obtaining food, shelter, and medical supplies, and transporting the sick and injured to medical facilities.

== Legacy ==
- There is a section of the Ursuline High School, Wimbledon in England campus named after Dorothy; it is widely known within the school as the DK block. That particular block is used for business studies and is fairly new, only built a few years ago. It contains many computers and new technology, and acts as the finance office of the school.
- There is a home that houses members of the Jesuit Volunteer Corps in South Central Los Angeles named in Dorothy's honor. Members of the program work as full-time volunteers at non-profit organizations such as My Friends Place, The Center at The Blessed Sacrament, Homeboy Industries, and Carecen.
- Ursuline College in Cleveland, Ohio maintains an award known as the Dorothy Kazel Award that honors students who showcase service and honesty. The college also has a volunteer organization known as the Sister Dorothy Kazel Club for Systemic Change which participates in annual protests with SOA watch and education on social justice.
- In 2021, the drama club at Beaumont School in Cleveland Heights, Ohio, where Kazel taught in the 1970s, performed a livestreamed biodrama in tribute to Kazel, titled "A Way To Serve." The play was based on the biography In the Fullness of Life, by Sister Cynthia Glavac.
