= List of Catholic schools in New York =

This is a list of Catholic schools in New York State.

== New York (state) ==
- Academy of Our Lady of Good Counsel High School, White Plains
- Academy of Saint Joseph, Brentwood
- Academy of the Holy Names, Albany
- Albertus Magnus High School, Bardonia
- Aquina Institute, Rochester
- Archangel School, Rochester
- Archbishop Stepinac High School, White Plains
- Bishop Maginn High School, Albany
- Blessed Sacrament School, Albany
- Blessed Sacrament School, Johnson City
- Blessed Sacrament School, Syracuse
- Blessed Virgin Mary Mother of God Church and Academy, Warners
- Buffalo Academy of the Sacred Heart, Eggertsville
- Canisius High School, Buffalo
- Cardinal O'Hara High School, Tonawanda
- Catholic Central High School, Troy
- Chaminade High School, Mineola
- Christ the King School, Middle Village
- Christian Brothers Academy, Albany
- Christian Brothers Academy, Syracuse
- Cohoes Catholic School, Cohoes
- DeSales Catholic School, Lockport
- Holy Angels Academy, Buffalo
- Holy Cross Academy, Oneida Castle
- Holy Cross School, Albany
- Holy Family Catholic School, Norwich
- Holy Family Regional School, Commack
- Holy Rosary School, Hawthorne
- Holy Spirit School, East Greenbush
- Holy Trinity Diocesan High School, Hicksville
- Holy Trinity School, Utica
- Immaculata Academy, Hamburg
- Immaculate Conception School, Ithaca
- Immaculate Heart Central School, Watertown
- Iona Preparatory School, New Rochelle
- John A. Coleman Catholic High School, Hurley
- John F. Kennedy High School, Somers
- John S. Burke Catholic High School, Goshen
- Kellenberg Memorial High School, Uniondale
- La Salle Institute, Troy
- Maria Regina High School, Hartsdale
- McQuaid Jesuit High School, Rochester
- Mount Saint Mary Academy, Kenmore
- Mother Teresa Academy, Clifton Park
- Northeastern Catholic Junior High School, Rochester
- Notre Dame Elementary School, Utica
- Notre Dame Jr/Sr High School, Utica
- Notre Dame-Bishop Gibbons School, Schenectady
- Our Lady of Lourdes, Malverne
- Our Lady of Lourdes High School, Poughkeepsie
- Our Lady of Mercy Academy, Syosset
- Our Lady of Mercy High School, Rochester
- Our Lady of Mercy School, Hicksville
- Our Lady of Peace School, Lynbrook
- Our Lady of Perpetual Help School, Lindenhurst
- Our Lady of Providence, Central Islip
- Our Lady of Sorrows-Seton Campus, Endicott
- Our Lady of the Hamptons School, Southampton
- Our Lady of the Miraculous Medal School, Ridgewood
- Our Lady of the Sacred Heart, Buffalo
- Our Lady of Victory School, Lackawanna
- Our Lady of Victory School, Troy (closed 2009)
- Our Mother of Sorrows School, Rochester
- Queen of the Rosary Academy, Amityville
- Regina Coeli School, Hyde Park
- Sacred Heart Academy, Hempstead
- Sacred Heart Cathedral School, Rochester
- Sacred Heart School, Troy
- Saint Aidan School, Williston Park
- Saint Ambrose School, Latham
- Saint Andrew Country Day School, Kenmore
- Saint Anthony's High School, South Huntington
- Saint Anthony School, Nanuet, New York
- Saint Augustine's School, Troy
- Saint Bartholomew School, Yonkers
- Saint Benedict's School, Amherst
- Saint Brigid's Regional Catholic School, Watervliet
- Saint Casimir School, Yonkers
- Saint Casimir's Regional School, Albany
- Saint Charles Borromeo School, Rochester
- Saint Christopher School, Tonawanda
- Saint Christopher's Parochial School, Baldwin
- Saint Clements Regional Catholic School, Saratoga Springs
- Saint Denis /Saint Columba School, Hopewell Junction
- Saint Dominic High School, Oyster Bay
- Saint Edmund Preparatory High School
- Saint Elizabeth Ann Seton Regional School, Wantagh
- Saint Elizabeth Ann Seton School, Shrub Oak
- Saint Eugene School, Yonkers
- Saint Francis De Sales Regional Catholic School, Herkimer
- Saint Francis – Saint Stephen's School, Geneva
- Saint Gregory the Great, Bellerose
- Saint Helen School, Rochester
- Saint Helen's School, Schenectady
- Saint James Middle School, Middle City
- Saint John Bosco, Seneca Falls
- Saint John of Rochester School, Fairport
- Saint John the Baptist, Yonkers
- Saint John the Baptist Diocesan High School, West Islip
- Saint John the Evangelist School, Binghamton
- Saint Josaphat School, Cheektowaga
- Saint Joseph School (Endicott, New York)
- Saint Joseph School, Middletown
- Saint Joseph School, Millbrook
- Saint Joseph's Collegiate Institute, Kenmore
- Saint Joseph's – Saint John's Academy, Rensselaer (closed 2003)
- Saint Joseph's School, Penfield
- Saint Jude the Apostle School, Wynantskill
- Saint Madeleine Sophie Catholic School, Schenectady
- Saint Margaret School, Pearl River
- Saint Martin DePorres School, Poughkeepsie
- Saint Mary Gate of Heaven School
- Saint Mary of The Snow, Saugerties
- Saint Mary's School, Canandaigua
- Saint Mary's School, Cortland
- Saint Mary's School, Oneonta
- Saint Mary's School for the Deaf
- Saint Michael School
- Saint Michael's School, Newark
- Saint Monica School, Rochester
- Saint Patrick School, Owego
- Saint Patrick School, Bay Shore
- Saint Paul's School, Kenmore
- Saint Peter School, Haverstraw
- Saint Peter's School, Hyde Park
- Saint Peter's School, Liberty
- Saint Pius X School, Loudonville
- Saint Pius X School, Rochester
- Saint Teresa of Avila School, Albany
- Saint Thérèse Chapel and Academy, Nicholville
- Saints Cyril and Methodius School, Deer Park
- Salesian High School, New Rochelle
- Saratoga Central Catholic Junior-Senior High School, Saratoga Springs
- School of the Holy Child, Rye
- Seton Catholic Central High School, Binghamton
- Siena Catholic Academy, Brighton
- Southtowns Catholic School, Lake View
- Turner Carroll High School, Buffalo
- Utica Catholic Academy (closed 1976)
- Villa Maria Academy, Buffalo

== New York City ==
=== The Bronx ===
- Academy of Mount Saint Ursula
- All Hallows High School
- Aquinas High School
- Cardinal Hayes High School
- Cardinal Spellman High School
- Fordham Preparatory School
- Holy Cross School
- Holy Family School
- Holy Rosary School
- Immaculate Conception School
- Marie Smith Urban Street Academy
- Monsignor Scanlan High School
- Mount Saint Michael Academy
- Preston High School
- Sacred Heart School
- Saint Barnabas Elementary School
- Saint Catharine Academy
- Saint Francis Xavier School
- Saint Joseph's School for the Deaf
- Saint Pius X High School
- Saint Raymond Academy for Girls
- Saint Raymond High School for Boys
- Saints Peter and Paul
- Villa Maria Academy

=== Brooklyn ===
Elementary Schools and Academies

- Blessed Sacrament Catholic Academy
- Brooklyn Jesuit Prep
- Good Shepherd Catholic Academy
- Holy Angels Catholic Academy (merging into Bay Ridge Catholic Academy, September 2020)
- Midwood Catholic Academy
- Our Lady of Grace Catholic Academy
- Our Lady of Perpetual Help Catholic Academy of Brooklyn
- Our Lady of Trust Catholic Academy
- Queen of the Rosary Catholic Academy
- Saint Anselm Catholic Academy (merging into Bay Ridge Catholic Academy, September 2020)
- Saint Athanasius Catholic Academy
- Saint Bernadette Catholic Academy
- Saint Bernard Catholic Academy
- Saint Brigid – Saint Frances Cabrini Catholic Academy
- Saint Catherine of Genoa ~ St. Therese of Lisieux Catholic Academy
- Saint Edmund School
- Saint Ephrem Catholic Academy
- Saint Francis of Assisi Catholic Academy
- Saint Francis Xavier Catholic Academy – Early Childhood
- Saint Gregory the Great Catholic Academy
- Saint Joseph the Worker Catholic Academy
- Saint Mark Catholic Academy
- Saint Patrick Catholic Academy
- Saint Peter Catholic Academy
- Saint Saviour Catholic Academy
- Saint Stanislaus Kostka Catholic Academy
- Salve Regina Catholic Academy
- Visitation Catholic Academy

High Schools

- Bishop Loughlin Memorial High School
- Fontbonne Hall Academy
- Nazareth Regional High School
- Saint Edmund Preparatory High School
- Saint Saviour High School
- Xaverian High School

=== Manhattan ===
- Academy of Saint Joseph, Greenwich Village
- Cathedral High School
- Convent of the Sacred Heart
- Cristo Rey New York
- De La Salle Academy
- Dominican Academy
- Guardian Angel School
- Holy Child Middle School
- Holy Name School
- Mother Cabrini High School (closed 2014)
- Notre Dame School
- Our Lady of Pompeii School
- Our Lady Queen of Angels Catholic Elementary School, Harlem
- Sacred Heart of Jesus School
- Saint Ann, The Personal School
- Saint Brigid School
- Saint Jean Baptiste High School
- Saint Vincent Ferrer High School
- Xavier High School

=== Queens ===
Elementary Schools and Academies

- Divine Wisdom Catholic Academy
- Holy Child Jesus Catholic Academy
- Holy Family Catholic Academy
- Holy Trinity Catholic Academy
- Immaculate Conception Catholic Academy, Astoria
- Immaculate Conception Catholic Academy, Jamaica
- Incarnation Catholic Academy
- Notre Dame Catholic Academy
- Our Lady's Catholic Academy
- Our Lady of Fatima School
- Our Lady of Grace Catholic Academy
- Our Lady of Hope Catholic Academy
- Our Lady of Mercy Catholic Academy
- Our Lady of Perpetual Help Catholic Academy
- Our Lady of Sorrows Catholic Academy
- Our Lady of the Blessed Sacrament Catholic Academy
- Our Lady of the Snows Catholic Academy
- Our Lady Queen of Martyrs Catholic Academy
- Resurrection-Ascension Catholic Academy
- Sacred Heart Catholic Academy, Bayside
- Sacred Heart Catholic Academy, Cambria Heights
- Sacred Heart Catholic Academy, Glendale
- Saint Adalbert Catholic Academy
- Saint Andrew Avellino Catholic Academy
- Saint Bartholomew Catholic Academy
- Saint Clare Catholic Academy
- Saint Elizabeth Catholic Academy
- Saint Francis of Assisi Catholic Academy
- Saint Gregory the Great Catholic Academy
- Saint Helen Catholic Academy
- Saint Joan of Arc School
- Saint Joseph Catholic Academy
- Saint Kevin Catholic Academy
- Saint Leo Catholic Academy
- Saint Luke School
- Saint Margaret Catholic Academy
- Saint Mary Gate of Heaven Catholic Academy
- Saint Matthias Catholic Academy
- Saint Mel Catholic Academy
- Saint Michael's Catholic Academy
- Saint Nicholas of Tolentine Catholic Academy
- Saint Rose of Lima Catholic Academy
- Saint Sebastian Catholic Academy
- Saint Stanislaus Kostka Catholic Academy of Queens
- Saint Thomas the Apostle Catholic Academy
- Saints Joachim and Anne School

High Schools

- Archbishop Molloy High School
- Cathedral Preparatory School and Seminary
- Christ the King Regional High School
- Holy Cross High School
- The Mary Louis Academy
- Monsignor McClancy Memorial High School
- Saint Agnes Academic High School
- Saint Francis Preparatory School
- Saint John's Preparatory School

=== Staten Island ===
- Blessed Sacrament School
- Monsignor Farrell High School
- Moore Catholic High School
- Notre Dame Academy
- Saint John Villa Academy (closed 2018)
- Saint Joseph by-the-Sea High School
- Saint Joseph Hill Academy
- St. Peters Boys Highschool
- Saint Teresa School

== See also ==
- List of schools in the Roman Catholic Archdiocese of New York
- List of closed schools in the Roman Catholic Archdiocese of New York
