= List of schools in the Roman Catholic Archdiocese of New York =

This is a list of schools in the American Roman Catholic Archdiocese of New York. The archdiocese covers New York, Bronx, and Richmond Counties in New York City (coterminous with the boroughs of Manhattan, the Bronx, and Staten Island, respectively), as well as Dutchess, Orange, Putnam, Rockland, Sullivan, Ulster, and Westchester counties in New York state.

To see a list of schools that have closed in the archdiocese, please review the List of closed schools in the Roman Catholic Archdiocese of New York. The majority of the schools in the archdiocese are no longer fully staffed by religious orders and largely now consist of lay faculty, with some religious continuing to maintain a presence in the schools they once founded and/or staffed. Many schools may now be in the care of a board of trustees. In July 2020 the archdiocese announced the permanent closure of a number of schools due to the financial effects of the COVID-19 pandemic, This list may contain inaccuracies as to what schools are still in operation.

== Seminaries ==
- St. Joseph's Seminary (Yonkers) – major seminary of the archdiocese established in 1896. Currently serves as the major seminary for the archdiocese, the Diocese of Brooklyn, the Diocese of Rockville Centre and the Community of the Franciscan Friars of the Renewal. Seminarians from other dioceses and religious orders also study at St. Joseph's for major seminary. The seminary also offers graduate degree programs for both lay and religious. Formerly staffed by the Society of St. Sulpice.

== High schools ==
=== New York City ===
==== The Bronx ====
- Academy of Mount St. Ursula – All-girls' school established in 1855; staffed by the Ursuline Sisters. amsu.org
- All Hallows High School – All-boys' school established in 1909; staffed by the Irish Christian Brothers and Dominican Sisters of Amityville. allhallows.org
- Cardinal Hayes High School – All-boys' school established in 1941; staffed by archdiocesan priests, the Brothers of St. Charles Lwanga, the Carmelite Brothers, the Dominican Sisters of Sparkill and the Irish Christian Brothers. Formerly staffed by the De La Salle Christian Brothers, the Franciscan Fathers & Brothers, the Marist Brothers and the Xaverian Brothers. cardinalhayes.org
- Cardinal Spellman High School – formerly co-institutional education school, now co-educational school established in 1959; staffed by archdiocesan priests, the Sisters of St. Francis and formerly staffed by the De La Salle Christian Brothers and the Sisters of Charity. cardinalspellman.org
- Fordham Preparatory School – All-boys' school established in 1841; staffed by the Jesuit Fathers. fordhamprep.org
- Monsignor Scanlan High School – Co-educational school established in 1976; staffed by the Dominican Sisters of Sparkill. Formerly staffed by the Marist Brothers. scanlanhs.edu
- Mount Saint Michael Academy – All-boys' school established in 1926; staffed by the Marist Brothers. mtstmichael.org
- Preston High School – All-girls' school established in 1947; staffed by the Sisters of the Divine Compassion. prestonhs.org
- St. Barnabas High School – All-girls' school established in 1924; staffed by the Sisters of Charity and the Religious of Jesus and Mary. stbarnabashigh.com
- St. Catharine Academy – All-girls' school established in 1889; staffed by the Sisters of Mercy, the Dominican Sisters of Sparkill and the Sisters of Charity; formerly staffed by the Religious of the Sacred Heart of Mary. scahs.org
- St. Raymond Academy – All-girls' school established in 1960; staffed by the Sisters of Charity and the Dominican Sisters of Blauvelt. straymondacademy.org
- St. Raymond High School for Boys – All-boys' school established in 1960; staffed by the De La Salle Christian Brothers. straymondhighschool.org

==== Manhattan ====
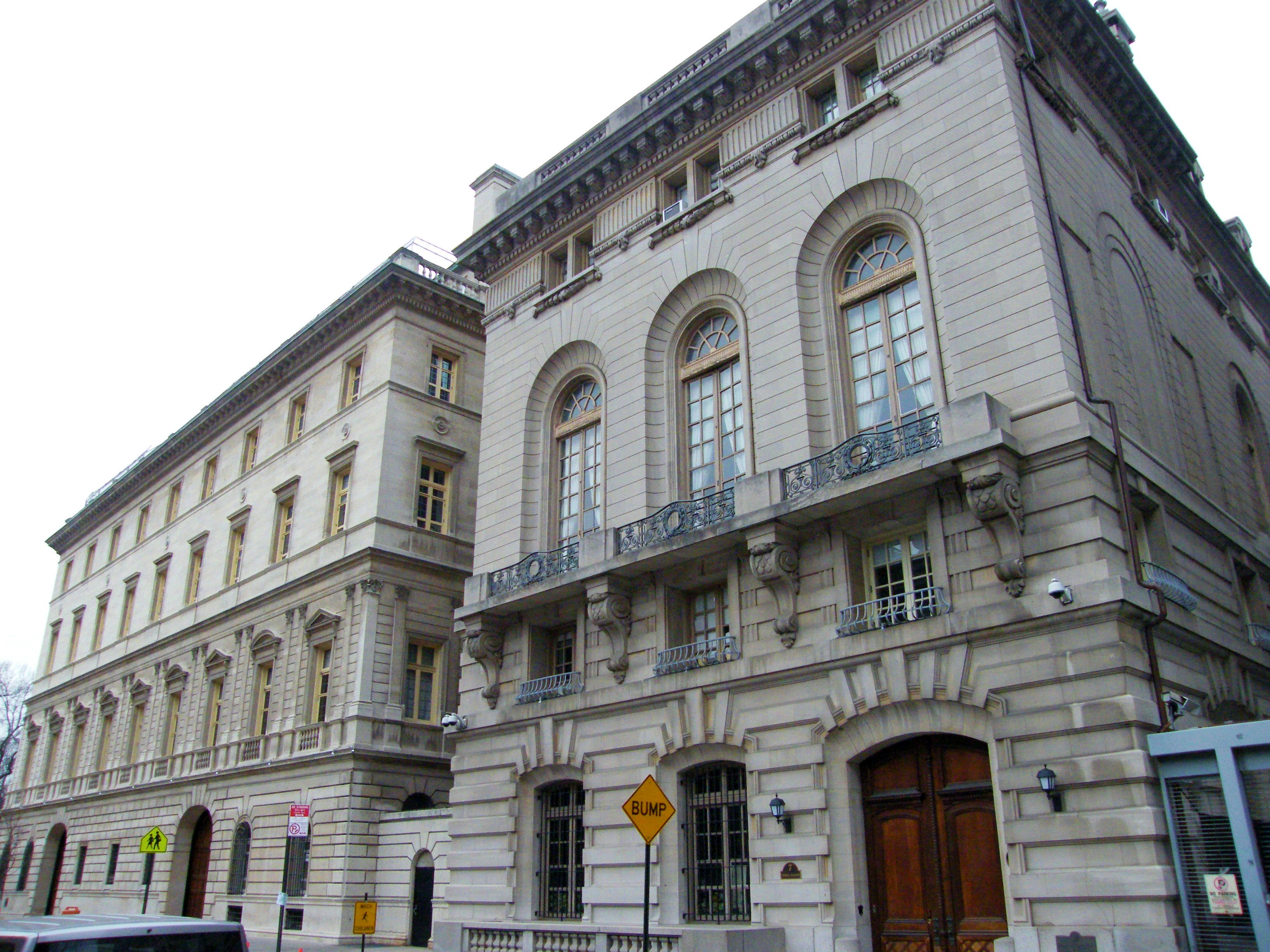
Convent of the Sacred Heart

- Cathedral High School – All-girls' school founded in 1905; staffed by the Sisters of Charity. cathedralhs.org
- Convent of the Sacred Heart – All-girls' school founded in 1881; sponsored by the Religious of the Sacred Heart of Jesus. cshnyc.org
- Cristo Rey New York High School – Co-educational school staffed by the Sisters of Christian Charity and the Jesuit Fathers; sponsored by the Society of the Holy Child Jesus and the Sisters of St. Dominic. cristoreyny.org
- Dominican Academy – All-girls' school staffed by the Dominican Sisters of Columbus and the Sisters, Servants of the Immaculate Heart of Mary. dominicanacademy.org
- La Salle Academy – All-boys' school founded in 1848; staffed by the De La Salle Christian Brothers. lasalleacademy.org
- Loyola School – Co-educational school founded in 1900; staffed by the Jesuit Fathers and the Sisters of Notre Dame; formerly all-boys until 1973. loyola-nyc.org
- Marymount School – All-girls' school founded in 1926; staffed by the Religious of the Sacred Heart of Mary. marymount.k12.ny.us
- Notre Dame School – All-girls' school established in 1943; formerly located on West 79th Street and St. Mark's Place; staffed by the Sisters of St. Ursula. cheznous.org
- Regis High School – All-boys' school founded in 1914; staffed by the Jesuit Fathers. regis.org
- St. George Academy – Ukrainian parish high school. saintgeorgeschools.org

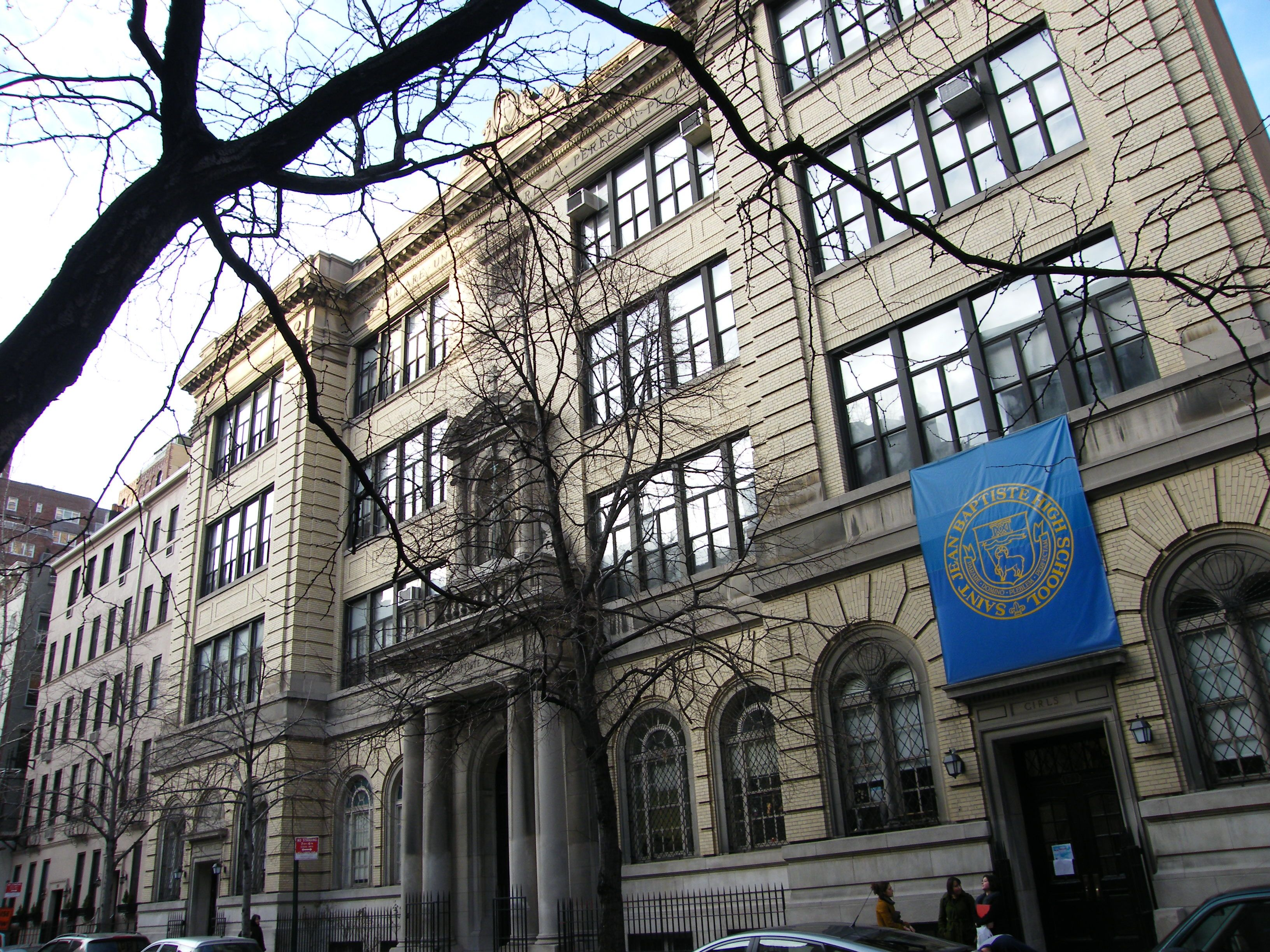
St. Jean Baptiste High School

- St. Jean Baptiste High School – All-girls' school founded in 1929; staffed by the Congregation de Notre Dame. stjean.org
- St. Vincent Ferrer High School – All-girls' school staffed by the Dominican Sisters of Our Lady of the Springs; formerly staffed by the Dominican Sisters of Columbus. saintvincentferrer.com
- Xavier High School – All-boys' school staffed by the Jesuit Fathers. xavierhs.org

==== Staten Island ====
- Monsignor Farrell High School – All-boys' school established in 1960; staffed by archdiocesan priests, Irish Christian Brothers and the Sisters of Charity. msgrfarrellhs.org
- Moore Catholic High School – Co-educational school established in 1962; formerly an all-girls' school (1962–1969). Staffed by archdiocesan priests and the Sisters of Our Lady of the Garden (2002 – present); formerly staffed by the Sisters of the Presentation of the Blessed Virgin Mary. moorecatholichs.org
- Notre Dame Academy – All-girls' school established in 1903; staffed by the Congregation de Notre Dame. notredameacademy.org
- St. Joseph by the Sea High School – Co-educational school established in 1963; formerly an all-girls' school (1963–1973); staffed by archdiocesan priests, the Sisters of Charity, the Sisters of St. Francis and the Sisters, Servants of the Immaculate Heart of Mary. stjosephbythesea.org
- St. Joseph Hill Academy – All-girls' school established in 1930; staffed by the Daughters of Divine Charity. stjhill.org
- St. Peter's Boys High School – All-boys' school established in 1917; staffed by the De La Salle Christian Brothers and the Sisters of St. Joseph of Brentwood. stpetersboyshs.org

=== Dutchess County ===
- Our Lady of Lourdes High School (Poughkeepsie) – Co-educational school established in 1958; staffed by the Marist Brothers; sponsored by the Dominican Sisters. ollchs.org

=== Orange County ===
- John S. Burke Catholic High School (Goshen) – Co-educational school established in 1963; formerly staffed by the Sisters of the Presentation of the Blessed Virgin Mary. burkecatholic.org

=== Rockland County ===
- Albertus Magnus High School (Bardonia) – Co-educational school established in 1957; staffed by the Dominican Sisters of Sparkill. albertusmagnus.net

=== Westchester County ===
- Archbishop Stepinac High School - All-boys' school established in 1948; operated by the archdiocese until becoming independent in 2010; staffed by archdiocesan priests stepinac.org
- Iona Preparatory School (New Rochelle) – All-boys' school established in 1916; operated and staffed by the Irish Christian Brothers. ionaprep.org
- John F. Kennedy Catholic High School (Somers) – Co-educational school established in 1967; operated by the archdiocese and staffed by archdiocesan priests and the Sisters of the Divine Compassion. kennedycatholic.org
- Maria Regina High School (Hartsdale) – All-girls' school established in 1957; formerly operated by the archdiocese, now operated by a board of trustees; staffed by lay faculty- formerly staffed by the Sisters of the Resurrection.
- Sacred Heart High School (Yonkers) – Co-educational school established in 1923; operated by the parish of Sacred Heart and the Capuchin Friars; formerly staffed by the Capuchin Friars, the Sisters of St. Agnes and the De La Salle Christian Brothers. sacredhearths.net
- Salesian High School (New Rochelle) – All-boys' school established in 1920; operated and staffed by the Salesians of Don Bosco. salesianhigh.org
- School of the Holy Child (Rye) – All-girls' school established in 1957; operated and staffed by the Society of the Holy Child Jesus. holychildrye.org
- The Montfort Academy (Mount Vernon) – Co-educational school established in 2001 in Katonah and relocated to Mt. Vernon in 2014; operated and staffed by lay faculty. themontfortacademy.org
- The Ursuline School (New Rochelle) – All-girls' school established in 1897; founded by the Ursuline Sisters. ursuline.pvt.k12.ny.us

== Elementary schools ==
=== New York City ===
==== The Bronx ====
- Christ the King Parish Elementary School (1345 Grand Concourse)
- Holy Rosary School (1500 Arnow Avenue) holyrosaryschoolbronx.org
- Immaculate Conception Parish School (378 East 151st Street) – Established in 1854; formerly staffed by the De La Salle Christian Brothers. ics151.org
- Mount St. Michael Private Elementary School – All-boys' school; grades 6–8 only.
- Our Lady of Grace Parish School (3981 Bronxwood Avenue)
- Our Lady of Mount Carmel Parish School (2465 Bathgate Avenue) – Established in 1924; formerly staffed by the Pallottine Sisters, the Sisters of Our Lady of Lourdes and the Brothers of the Holy Cross.
- Our Lady of Refuge Parish School (2708 Briggs Avenue)
- Sacred Heart Parish School (95 West 168th Street) – Established in 1926; formerly staffed by the Sisters of Mercy and the Brothers of the Christian Schools. shhighbridge.org
- St. Anselm Parochial School (685 Tinton Avenue) – Established in 1908; formerly staffed by the Dominican Sisters of Blauvelt. stanselmbx.org
- St. Athanasius Parish School (830 Southern Boulevard) – Established in 1913; formerly staffed by the Sisters of Charity and the Lasallian Christian Brothers. stathanasiusbronx.org
- St. Barnabas Parish School (413 East 241st Street) – Established in 1913; staffed by the Sisters of Charity. stbarnabasschool.org
- St. Clare of Assisi School (1911 Hone Avenue) – Established in 1951; staffed by the Oblates of the Blessed Trinity. stclareofassisischool.org - merged with St. Francis of Assisi School in 2023
- St. Frances de Chantal School (2962 Harding Ave.) – Established in 1930; staffed by the Sisters of the Divine Compassion. sfdchantalschool.org
- St. Francis of Assisi School (4300 Baychester Avenue) – Established in 1968; grades 1–8. sfabx.com - merged with St. Clare of Assisi School in 2023
- St. Francis Xavier School (1711 Haight Avenue) – Established in 1930; formerly staffed by the Sisters of Mercy. sfxschool.net
- St. Gabriel School (590 West 235th Street) – Established in 1941. saintgabrielschoolbronx.org - Merged with St. Margaret of Cortona in 2023
- St. Helena School (2050 Benedict Avenue) – sthelenaelementary.org
- St. Ignatius School (740 Manida Street) – Established in 1995; staffed and administered by the Jesuits; boys-only from 1995 to 2004; grades 6–8 only. sis-nativity.org
- St. John Chrysostom School (1144 Hoe Avenue) – sjchrysostom.org
- St. Joseph Parish School (1946 Bathgate Avenue) – Established in 1877; closed in 2019. saintjosephschoolbronx.org
- St. Lucy Parish School (Mace Avenue at Bronxwood Avenue) – Established in 1955; staffed until 1974 by the Franciscan Sisters of Allegheny. stlucys.org
- St. Margaret of Cortona Parish School (452 West 160th Street) – Established in 1926; formerly staffed by the Sisters of Charity. stmargaretschoolriverdale.com - Merged with St. Gabriel School in 2023
- St. Mary Parish School (3956 Carpenter Avenue)
- St. Nicholas of Tolentine Parish School (2345 University Avenue) – Established in 1907.
- St. Philip Neri Parish School (3031 Grand Concourse)
- St. Raymond Parish School (2380 East Tremont Avenue) – Staffed by the Religious of Jesus and Mary. straymondelementary.org
- St. Simon Stock Parish School (2195 Valentine Avenue) – Established in 1928. stsimonstockschool.org
- St. Theresa School (2872 St. Theresa Avenue) – Established in 1954; formerly staffed by the Dominican Sisters of Sparkill. sites.google.com/sttheresaschoolbronx.org/st-theresa-school-bronx
- Sts. Peter and Paul Parish School (838 Brook Avenue) – ssppschoolsite.org
- The School of St. Benedict (1016 Edison Avenue) – stbenedictschoolbx.org
- Villa Maria Academy (3355 Country Club Road) – Staffed by the Congregation of Notre Dame Sisters. vma-ny.org

==== Manhattan ====
- Academy of St. Joseph (111 Washington Place) – K–8; established in 2007. academyofsaintjoseph.org
- Annunciation School (461 West 131st Street) – K–8; formerly staffed by the De La Salle Christian Brothers and the Dominican Sisters.
- Blessed Sacrament Parish School (147 West 70th Street) – Established in 1903; formerly staffed by the Sisters of Charity and the Lasallian Christian Brothers. sblsnyc.org
- Convent of the Sacred Heart (1 East 91st Street) – All-girls' school; formerly staffed by the Religious of the Sacred Heart of Jesus. cshnyc.org
- Cornelia Connelly Center (220 East 4th Street) – Grades 5–8 only. connellycenter.org
- The Epiphany School (234 East 22nd Street) – Established in 1888; formerly staffed by the Lasallian Christian Brothers (1900–1935) and the Sisters of Charity (1888–1978). theepiphanyschool.org
- Good Shepherd School (620 Isham Street) – Formerly staffed by the Sisters of Mercy and the De La Salle Christian Brothers. gsschoolnyc.org
- Guardian Angel Parish School (193 Tenth Avenue) – guardianangelschool-nyc.org
- Incarnation Parish School (570 West 175th Street) – Formerly staffed by the De La Salle Christian Brothers. incarnationnyc.org
- Marymount Private School (1026 Fifth Avenue) – Established in 1926; formerly staffed by the Religious of the Sacred Heart of Mary. marymountnyc.org
- Mount Carmel/Holy Rosary Parish School (371 Pleasant Avenue) – Established in 1949. mtcarmelholyrosary.org
- Nativity Mission Private School (204 Forsyth Street) – Established in 1971; all-boys' school; grades 6–8 only; staffed and administered by the Jesuits. nativitymissionschool.org
- Our Lady of Lourdes Parish School (438 West 143rd Street) – Established in 1904. ourladyoflourdesschool.net
- Our Queen of Angels Parish School (232 East 113th Street) olqaeastharlem.org
- Sacred Heart of Jesus Parish School (456 West 52nd Street) – Established in 1892; previously staffed by the Sisters of Charity of New York and the Christian Brothers. shjsnyc.org
- St. Aloysius Jesuit School (West 132nd Street) – Established in 1940; previously staffed by the Handmaids of the Most Pure Heart of Mary; the school was transferred from the parish to the Jesuits in 2010. staloysiusschool.org
- St. Brigid's Catholic School (185 East 7th Street) – Established in 1856; previously staffed by the Sisters of Charity of New York and the Christian Brothers; closed in 2019.
- St. Charles Borromeo Parish School (214 West 142nd Street) – Established in 1924; staffed by the Sisters of the Blessed Sacrament. stcharlesschoolcentral.org
- St. Elizabeth Parish School (612 West 187th Street) – steliznyc.org
- St. George Private School (215 East 6th Street) – saintgeorgeschools.org
- St. Gregory the Great Parish School (138 West 90th Street) – Established in 1913; formerly staffed by the Sisters of Charity of New York. stgregorymanhattan.org
- St. Ignatius Loyola Parish School (48 East 84th Street) – saintignatiusloyolaschool.com
- St. Joseph Parish School (420 East 87th Street) – sjsyorkville.org
- St. Mark the Evangelist Parish School (55 West 138th Street) – saintmarkschool.org
- St. Rose of Lima Parish School (517 West 164th Street) –Closed in 2019. stroseoflimanyc.org
- St. Stephen of Hungary Parish School (408 East 82nd Street) – Formerly staffed by the Sisters, Servants of the Immaculate Heart of Mary. saintstephenschool.org
- Transfiguration Parish School (29 Mott Street) – Formerly staffed by the Maryknoll Sisters. transfigurationschoolnyc.org

==== Staten Island ====
- Academy of St. Dorothy Private School – Established in 1932 by the Sisters of St. Dorothy.
- Blessed Sacrament Parish School (830 Delafield Avenue) – Established in 1910; formerly staffed by the Sisters of Charity.
- Holy Rosary Parish School
- Immaculate Conception Parish School (Stapleton) – Established in 1907; formerly staffed by the Sisters of Charity. ics-si.org
- Notre Dame Academy Private School – All-girls' school.
- Our Lady Help of Christians Parish School – Closed in June 2019.
- Our Lady of Good Counsel Parish School
- Our Lady Queen of Peace Parish School
- Our Lady Star of the Sea Parish School
- Sacred Heart Parish School
- St. Adalbert Parish School
- St. Ann Parish School
- St. Charles Parish School – Established in 1963.
- St. Clare Parish School – Established in 1936; formerly staffed by the Presentation Sisters.
- St. John Villa Academy Private School (57 Cleveland Place) – Staffed by the Sisters of St. John the Baptist.
- St. Joseph Hill Academy Private School
- St. Joseph Parish School
- St. Patrick Parish School
- St. Rita Parish School
- St. Teresa Parish School

=== Dutchess County ===
- Holy Trinity Elementary School (Poughkeepsie) – Established in 1952; staffed by the Sisters, Servants of the Immaculate Heart of Mary (since 1952); formerly staffed by the Marist Brothers (1957–1963). holy-trinity-school.com
- St. Denis/St. Columba Parish School (Hopewell Junction) – Grades 1–8 only; staffed by the Sisters of the Resurrection (since 2010); formerly staffed by the Dominican Sisters.
- St. Martin de Porres Parish School (Poughkeepsie) – Established in 1853; formerly known as St. Michael School (1853–1962); formerly staffed by the Sisters of Christian Charity. stmartindeporresschool.org
- St. Mary Parish School (Fishkill) – stmaryfishkill.org

=== Orange County ===
- Bishop Dunn Memorial Private School (Newburgh) – Staffed by the Dominican Sisters of Hope. msmc.edu/bishop-dunn-memorial-school
- Most Precious Blood Parish School (Walden) – Established in 1966; staffed by the Dominican Sisters of Sparkill. mpbwalden.org
- Our Lady of Mount Carmel Parish School (Middletown) – mtcarmelschoolmiddletown.org
- Sacred Heart Parish School (Monroe) – Established in 1965; formerly staffed by the Dominican Sisters of Sparkill. sacredheartmonroe.net
- Sacred Heart Parish School (Newburgh) – sacredheartschoolnewburgh.org
- St. John the Evangelist Parish School (Goshen) – Grades 1–8 only; staffed by the Dominican Sisters of Blauvelt. sjsgoshen.org
- St. Stephen Parish School (Warwick) – Formerly staffed by the School Sisters of Notre Dame. ststephen-stedward.org

=== Putnam County ===
- St. James the Apostle Parish School (Carmel) – stjamescarmel.org

=== Rockland County ===
- Sacred Heart Parish School (Suffern) – sacredheartschoolsuffern.com
- St. Anthony Parish School (Nanuet) – Established in 1953; staffed by the Dominican Sisters of Sparkill. stanthonyschoolnanuet.org
- St. Gregory Barbarigo Parish School (Garnerville) – Established in 1963. sgbschool.org
- St. Margaret Parish School (Pearl River) – Established in 1953; formerly staffed by the Sisters of St. Dominic. saintmargaretschool.com
- St. Paul Parish School (Valley Cottage) – Established in 1961; staffed by the Sisters of St. Dominic. saintpaulschoolvc.com

=== Sullivan County ===
- St. Peter Regional Parish School (Liberty) – Established in 1897; formerly staffed by the Dominican Sisters of Blauvelt; closed in 2019. stpetersliberty.org

=== Ulster County ===
- Kingston Catholic School (Kingston) – Established in 1970; formed by the merger of St. Mary and St. Peter schools in Kingston. kingstoncatholicschool.com
- St. Joseph Parish School (Kingston) – Established in 1868; formerly staffed by the Sisters of Charity (1905–1943) and the Sisters of St. Ursula (1943–2001). stjokgn.org/revised2-school/SJSchool.html

=== Westchester County ===
- Annunciation Parish School (Crestwood) – Staffed by the Sisters of the Presentation of the Blessed Virgin Mary and lay faculty; formerly staffed by the Dominican Sisters of Newburgh. school.annunciationcrestwood.com
- Corpus Christi/Holy Family School (Port Chester) – Established in 2008 through the merger of Corpus Christi and Holy Family schools.
- Immaculate Conception Parish School (Tuckahoe) – Formerly staffed by the Sisters of St. Francis. icschoolonline.org
- Immaculate Heart of Mary Parish School (Scarsdale) – Established in 1928; formerly staffed by the Sisters of Charity (1928–1967) and the Dominican Sisters of Sparkill (1967–1972). ihmscarsdale.org
- Iona Preparatory Lower School (formerly Iona Grammar School) (New Rochelle) – All-boys' pre-k–8 school, staffed by the Irish Christian Brothers and lay faculty; merged with Iona Preparatory School in 2013; operated by Iona Preparatory School. ionagrammar.com
- Neumann Classical School (Tuckahoe) – neumannschool.org
- Our Lady of Mount Carmel Parish School (Elmsford) – Established in 1929; staffed by the Sisters of the Divine Compassion. olmc.ws
- Our Lady of Perpetual Help Parish School (Pelham Manor) – olphpelham.com
- Our Lady of Sorrows Parish School (White Plains) – Grades 1–8 only.
- Our Lady of Victory Parish School (Mount Vernon) – Formerly staffed by the Sisters of St. Dominic.
- Resurrection Parish School (Rye) – Established in 1905; formerly staffed by the Sisters of Charity. resurrectionschool.com
- Sacred Heart Parish School (Hartsdale) – Established in 1953; staffed by the Sisters of Charity (since 1979); formerly staffed by the Sisters of the Divine Compassion (1953–1979).
- Sacred Heart Parish School (Yonkers) – shgsyonkers.org
- St. Ann Parish School (Yonkers) – Established in 1959; formerly staffed by the Sisters of Charity. stannschoolyonkers.org
- St. Anthony Parish School (Yonkers) – Established in 1962; staffed by the Dominican Sisters of Sparkill. stanthonyschoolyonkers.org
- St. Augustine Parish School (Ossining) – Established in 1892; formerly staffed by the Sisters of Charity. staugustineschool.org
- St. Columbanus Parish School (Cortlandt Manor) – st-columbanus.com
- St. Eugene Parish School (Yonkers) – Established in 1951; previously staffed by the Sisters of St. Francis of Hastings-on-Hudson.
- St. John the Baptist Parish School (Yonkers) – Established in 1953; previously staffed by the Franciscan Sisters of Baltimore.
- St. Joseph Parish School (Bronxville)- Established in 1951; formerly staffed by the Adrian Dominican Sisters. stjosephschool. net
- St. Patrick Parish School (Yorktown Heights) – Established in 1953; formerly staffed by the Franciscan Sisters of Peace (1953–2004). stpatricksschoolyorktown.org
- St. Peter Parish School (Yonkers) – Established in 1911. stpetersny.com
- Sts. John & Paul Parish School (Larchmont) – sjpschool.org
- Transfiguration Parish School (Tarrytown) – transfigurationschool.org

== Special schools ==
- St. Joseph's School for the Deaf (The Bronx) – Established in 1869; sponsored by the Daughters of the Heart of Mary. sjsdny.org

== See also ==
- List of Catholic schools in New York (state)
- Lavelle School for the Blind (The Bronx) – Established in 1904; sponsored by the Marist Brothers and Dominican Sisters of Blauvelt. Formerly known as the Catholic Institution for the Blind.
