= Blessed Martyrs of Drina =

20th-century Catholic nuns and martyrs

- Painting of the Holy Martyrs of Drina, with the Holy Ghost above them.

Martyrs
- Born: Austria-Hungary
- Died: Goražde, Independent State of Croatia
- Venerated in: Catholic Church
- Beatified: 24 September 2011, Sarajevo, Bosnia and Herzegovina by Cardinal Angelo Amato (on behalf of Pope Benedict XVI)
- Major shrine: Drina River, by the town of Goražde
- Feast: 15 December
- Attributes: Dove; Martyr's palm Religious habit
- Patronage: Nuns, the sick, Slovenia, Croatia, Bosnia and Herzegovina Hungary, Austria

The Blessed Martyrs of Drina (Serbo-Croatian: Drinske mučenice) are the professed Sisters of the Congregation of the Daughters of Divine Charity, who died during World War II. Four were killed when they jumped out of a window in Goražde on 15 December 1941, reportedly to avoid being raped by Chetniks, and the last was killed by the Chetniks in Sjetlina the following week. The five nuns were later declared martyrs and beatified by Pope Benedict XVI (delegated to Cardinal Angelo Amato) on 24 September 2011.

== Background ==
On 6 April 1941, Axis forces invaded the Kingdom of Yugoslavia. Poorly equipped and poorly trained, the Royal Yugoslav Army was quickly defeated. The country was then dismembered. The extreme Croatian nationalist and fascist Ante Pavelić, who had been in exile in Benito Mussolini's Italy, was appointed Poglavnik (leader) of an Ustasha-led Croatian state – the Independent State of Croatia (Croatian: Nezavisna Država Hrvatska, NDH). The NDH combined almost all of modern-day Croatia, all of modern-day Bosnia and Herzegovina and parts of modern-day Serbia into an "Italian-German quasi-protectorate." NDH authorities, led by the Ustasha Militia, subsequently implemented genocidal policies against the Serb, Jewish and Romani populations living within the borders of the new state. Ethnic Serbs, the largest minority, were massacred, killed in concentration camps or forcibly converted to Catholicism. Two resistance movements emerged to combat the NDH and the Axis occupiers—the royalist Serb Chetniks, led by Colonel Draža Mihailović, and the multi-ethnic, communist Yugoslav Partisans, led by Josip Broz Tito.

Jezdimir Dangić, an officer who served in the gendarmerie of the first Serbian puppet government sought permission to travel to Bosnia and escort his family and relatives to safety after news reached him of the Ustaše massacres of Serbs. In the summer his request was approved, and he travelled via Mihailović's headquarters at Ravna Gora. In August 1941, Dangić was sent by Mihailović to eastern Bosnia to take command of the Chetnik detachments in the region and bring them under Mihailović's control. He collected a group of Bosnian Serbs and crossed the Drina River into the NDH, arriving in eastern Bosnia on 16 August. In the beginning, his operations were directed primarily against the Ustaše and the Bosnian Muslim population of the area. By early September, Dangić had established himself as the leader of all Chetnik groups in eastern Bosnia. In late November 1941, Major Boško Todorović reached an agreement with Lieutenant-Colonel Castagnieri, commander of the Italian garrison in Goražde, regarding the Italian evacuation and hand-over of the town to the Chetniks. On 29 November 1941, the Italians placed Goražde under the control of Dangić's men.

The town was under complete Chetnik control by 1 December. Following the arrival of Dangić, Chetnik bands spread through the town and began killing, raping, pillaging and torching homes. A significant number of victims were killed on a bridge over the Drina, after which their bodies were dropped into the river. Croatian Home Guard prisoners and NDH officials were also immediately executed. Chetnik forces in Bosnia, including those of Dangić, then set about pursuing an anti-Muslim campaign through eastern Bosnia to recompense for the persecution experienced by ethnic Serbs in the NDH.

== History ==
=== Martyrdom ===
Dangić's Chetniks entered the town of Pale on 11 December. They looted and burnt down the local Roman Catholic convent, Marijin dom ("Mary's Home"), and captured its five nuns (two Slovene, one Croat, one Hungarian, and one Austrian). The five were Jula Ivanišević (b. 1893), Berchmana Leidenix (b. 1865), Krizina Bojanc (b. 1885), Antonija Fabjan (b. 1907) and Bernadeta Banja (Bernadett Bánya) (b. 1912). That evening, the nuns and some other prisoners were forced to march across the Romanija mountain range in freezing temperatures and waist-deep snow. The five were mocked, insulted and threatened by their captors as they marched. While passing through the village of Sjetlina, 76-year-old sister Leidenix became exhausted. She was separated from the group and forced to remain behind. She was reportedly executed by the Chetniks in a forest near Sjetlina. The four remaining nuns were taken to Goražde on 15 December and detained on the third floor of a former Royal Yugoslav Army barracks upon arrival. That evening, a group of Chetniks entered the room in which they were being held and reportedly attempted to rape them. The four committed suicide, jumping from the second-floor window to avoid being raped. The corpses were taken from the barracks and thrown into the Drina River.

=== Aftermath ===
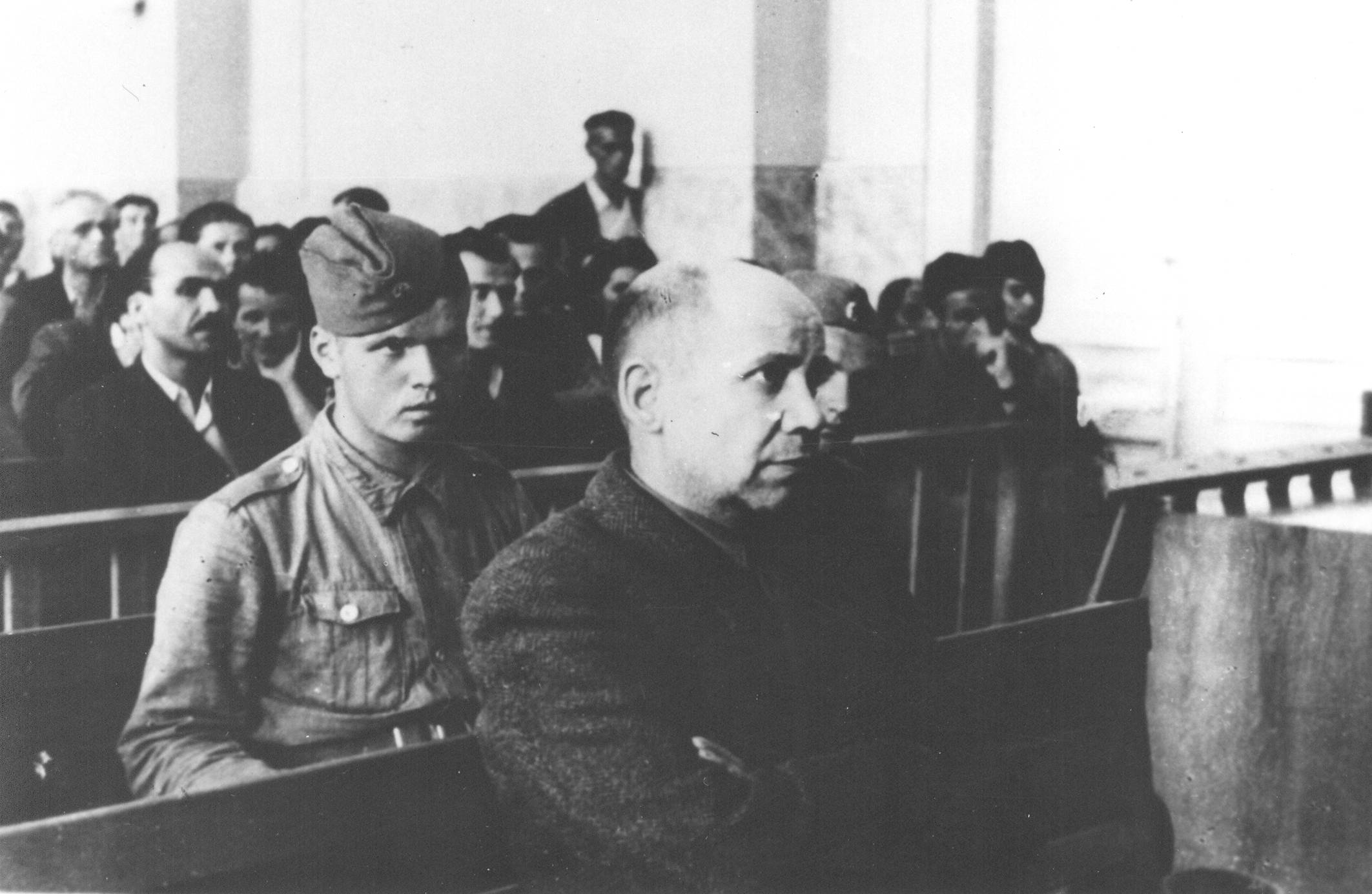
Jezdimir Dangić at trial

News of the deaths quickly spread throughout the NDH. In April 1942, Dangić was arrested by the Germans and taken to a prisoner-of-war camp in German-occupied Poland. He escaped from prison in 1943 and participated in the Warsaw Uprising against the Germans the following year.

Dangić was captured by the Red Army in 1945 and extradited to Yugoslavia's new communist authorities, who charged him with war crimes. He was tried, found guilty by a court in Sarajevo and sentenced to death. He was executed by firing squad on 22 August 1947.

== Beatification ==
The five nuns were declared martyrs, on 14 January 2011, Pope Benedict XVI announced the promulgation of decrees of the Congregation for the Causes of Saints. The nuns were beatified at a ceremony presided over by Cardinal Angelo Amato in Sarajevo on 24 September 2011.

A non-fiction book about the nuns was written by Croatian author Anto Baković, titled Drinske mučenice (Drina Martyrs; Sarajevo, 1990). Sister Slavica Buljan, a Bosnian-Croatian nun, writer and poet, wrote Zavjet krvlju potpisan (Vow Signed With Blood; Zagreb, 2010).
