= Krizina Bojanc =

Slovenian Roman Catholic nun, farmer, and martyr (1885–1941)

Blessed Sister M. Krizina Bojanc, FDC
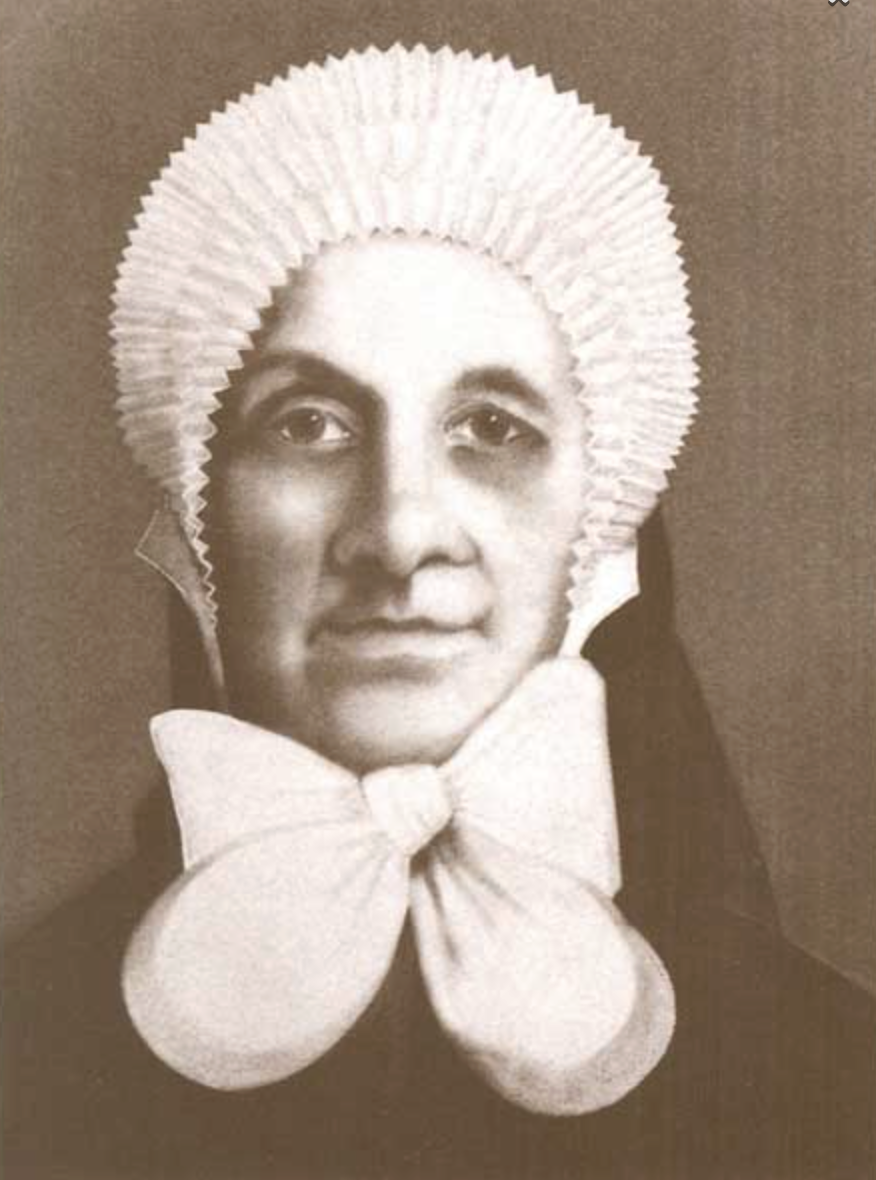
- Born: Jožefa Bojanc; 14 May 1885; Zbure, Slovenia
- Died: 15 December 1941 (aged 56)

Sister M. Krizina Bojanc, FDC (14 May 1885 – 15 December 1941), baptized Jožefa, was a Slovenian Roman Catholic nun, farmer, and martyr.

She was a sister of the Institute of the Daughters of Divine Charity, and is one of the five Blessed Martyrs of Drina. The prayer day for the five sisters is 15th of every month.

Pope Benedict XVI beatified Bojanc and her four fellow Sisters of the Congregation of the Daughters of Divine Charity and declared them blessed on 14 January 2011. The ceremony was held in Sarajevo, Bosnia-Herzegovina, on 24 September 2011, and Italian Cardinal Angelo Amato attended and celebrated the mass on behalf of Pope Benedict.

Bojanc had an agricultural vocation, farming to grow food and also tending cattle that supplied the sisters' charity schools and homes.
