= Albertus Magnus High School =

Location
- 798 Route 304; Bardonia, New York; Bardonia, (Rockland County), New York 10954; United States; 41.1203°N 73.9913°W

Information
- Type: Private, co-educational high school
- Motto: Built on Faith, Bound for Excellence
- Religious affiliation: Roman Catholic
- Patron saint: Saint Albert the Great (Albertus Magnus)
- Established: 1957 (69 years ago)
- School code: 307
- Principal: Christopher Power
- Head of school: Joseph Tweed
- Faculty: 42
- Grades: 9–12
- Gender: Co-educational
- Average class size: about 24
- Student to teacher ratio: 12:1
- Campus type: Suburban
- Colors: Maroon, gray and white
- Athletics conference: Section 1 (NYSPHSAA)
- Sports: Baseball, basketball, cheerleading, cross country, field hockey, football, golf, ice hockey, lacrosse, soccer, softball, swimming, tennis, track, volleyball
- Mascot: Falcon
- Nickname: Falcons
- Rival: Pearl River High School
- Accreditation: Middle States Association of Colleges and Schools
- Newspaper: Magnus Monitor
- Yearbook: The Gauntlet
- School fees: $750
- Tuition: $17,385.00 (1st child, 2026)
- Affiliation: Dominican Sisters of Sparkill
- Campus Minister: Sister Diane McSherry
- Admissions Director: Noreen Power
- Athletic Director: Brendan Gorman
- Director of Information Technology: Mike Fevola
- Director of Advancement: Una Miller
- Website: albertusmagnus.net

Albertus Magnus High School, also known as AMHS, Albertus, and Magnus, is an American Catholic, co-educational high school located in Bardonia, New York, named after the German philosopher and theologian of the same name. It is the only Catholic high school in Rockland County, New York.

The school is administered by the Dominican Sisters of Sparkill, which was founded on May 6, 1876, in New York City by Mother Catherine Mary Antoninus Thorpe. Albertus Magnus High School is one of the many schools and missions in New York State, Missouri, Maryland, Montana, Pakistan, and Peru staffed by the Sparkill Dominicans in their 130-year history.

More than 80 percent of the student body participates in the many extracurricular activities available at the school.

== History ==
At the request of Cardinal Spellman in the early 1950s, the Dominican Sisters of Sparkill founded Albertus Magnus High School.

In July 1957, the property was purchased and thus began the journey of Albertus Magnus, the first Catholic secondary school in Rockland County.

By September 1960, the new school and convent were ready for occupancy. Since the first graduating class in 1961, 7,189 students have graduated from the school.

The school is accredited by the Middle States Association, Commission on Secondary Schools.

In 2022, the Albertus Magnus Girls Soccer Team won the NYS Class A Championship, finished the season as the #1 ranked team in all of New York State.

In 2023, the Boys Baseball team reached the New York State Final Four for Class B.

The Girls varsity basketball team won the Class AA New York State Championship in 2024, their first state title in basketball since 1992, while the girls softball team made their first ever final four.

In the Fall of 2025, the Girls varsity soccer team won the Class AA New York State Championship, making it back-to-back years and their third NYS Championship in four years. Head coach Danny Samimi was named the coach for the East team for the 2025 High School All-American Game. Albertus Magnus had two players named to the team as well.

The Boys varsity soccer team also made it to the New York State Final Four in the Fall of 2025. Varsity Coach Brian Fitzpatrick was named Section 1's "Small School Coach of the Year."

Albertus Magnus' Musical Director, Cesar Orozco, has been nominated for three Latin Grammy Awards and won his first in 2025.

== Notable alumni ==
- John McLaughlin, Presidential Pollster
- George Buckheit, Distance Runner
- Tom McNamara, Major League Baseball Scout & Executive
- John W. McGowan, State Assemblyman
- Joseph Clinton, Basketball Coach and Athletic Director
- Rick Cabrera, D1 Basketball Coach
- John Diffley, Soccer Player and Athletic Administrator
- Mary Fahl, Singer, Songwriter, and Actress
- Kyle Hoffer, American Soccer Player
- Robert B. McKeon, Businessman

== See also ==
- St. Gregory Barbarigo School
