= List of Northwestern State Demons basketball head coaches =

The following is a list of Northwestern State Demons basketball head coaches. There have been 11 head coaches of the Demons in their 108-season history.

Northwestern State's current head coach is Rick Cabrera. He was hired as the Demons' head coach in March 2023, replacing Corey Gipson, who left to become the head coach at Austin Peay.

| No. | Tenure | Coach | Years | Record | Pct. |
|---|---|---|---|---|---|
| 1 | 1912–1950 (Note: Some records from this period are incomplete.) (Note: Northwestern State did not field a team for the 1917–18 season due to World War I.) (Note: Northwestern State did not field a team for the 1943–44 or 1944–45 seasons due to World War II.) | H. Lee Prather | 35 | 473–169 | .737 |
| 2 | 1950–1957 | Red Thomas | 7 | 138–77 | .642 |
| 3 | 1957–1965 | Huey Cranford | 8 | 116–98 | .542 |
| 4 | 1965–1980 | Tynes Hildebrand | 15 | 191–199 | .490 |
| 5 | 1980–1985 | Wayne Yates | 5 | 48–92 | .343 |
| 6 | 1985–1988 | Don Beasley | 3 | 42–41 | .506 |
| 7 | 1988–1994 | Dan Bell | 6 | 68–98 | .410 |
| 8 | 1994–1999 | J. D. Barnett | 5 | 55–79 | .410 |
| 9 | 1999–2022 | Mike McConathy | 23 | 330–377 | .467 |
| 10 | 2022–2023 | Corey Gipson | 1 | 22–11 | .667 |
| 11 | 2023–present | Rick Cabrera | 0 | 0–0 | – |
| Totals | | 11 coaches | 108 seasons | 1,483–1,241 | .544 |
Records updated through end of 2022–23 season Source
