= Garnerville, New York =

Hamlet in New York, United States

Coordinates: 41°12′06″N 73°59′40″W

Garnerville, previously known as Calicotown, is a hamlet in the Town of Haverstraw, Rockland County, New York, United States, located north of New York City; east of Mount Ivy; south of Stony Point and west of West Haverstraw. Most of the hamlet is within the West Haverstraw village, while a small portion of Garnerville defaults to the town of Haverstraw.

The hamlet was named after the Garner family, who operated a textile printing industry called Garner Printworks on Minisceongo Creek near Railroad Avenue beginning in 1838. East of where the Garner printworks operated is the abandoned Calico Hill Cemetery.

The community is bisected by U.S. Route 202. The Haverstraw town hall is located in the hamlet, along with several small shopping centers and the King's Daughters Library. The schools in Garnerville include North Garnerville Elementary School and St. Gregory Barbarigo Parochial School; the hamlet is part of the North Rockland Central School District.

== History ==
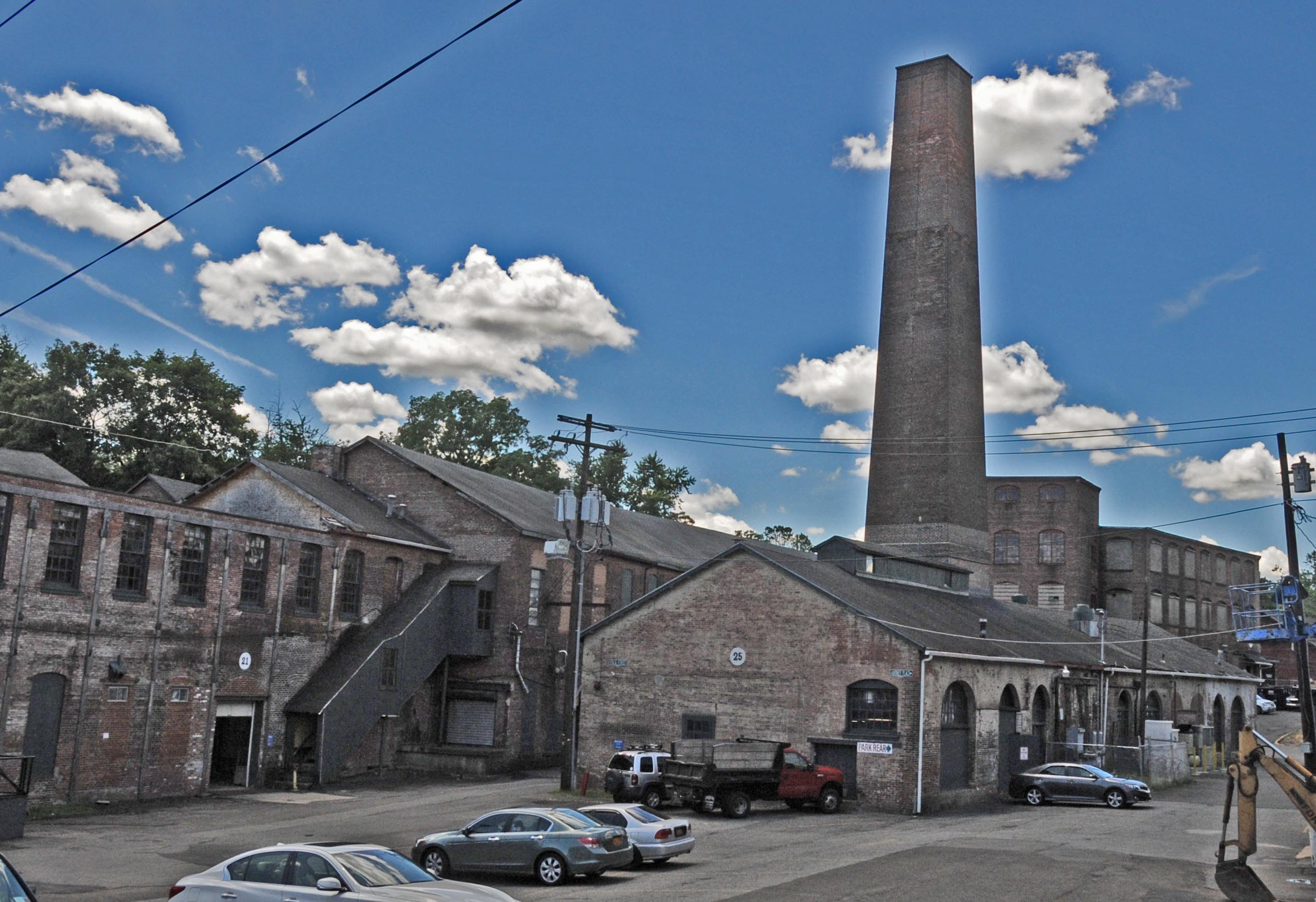
Garner Print Works

Around 1760, Cornelius Osborn built a grist mill at a waterfall on the Minisceongo Creek; this later became the site of the Calico Works. In 1828, a rolling mill and a nail factory were established a bit upstream on the site of a former grist mill by John I. and George Suffern. From 1850 to 1858, John I. Suffern manufactured coarse wrapping paper at that location.

Also in 1828, Scotsman John Glass purchased forty-five acres south of the Minisceongo for a calico print works. On June 7, 1831, Glass was loading goods to be shipped to New York City on board the General Jackson, docked at Grassy Point, New York. The steamboat's boiler exploded, killing fourteen people, including Glass. In 1838 the property was purchased by James and Thomas Garner and Charles Wells. The Garner print works prospered; buildings were enlarged and extended. The works employed about 800 people, and a village sprang up around the factory, to be called "Garnerville". In 1853 the Rockland Print Works Company was incorporated for the purpose of "Printing and Dyeing Woolen, Cotton, and Linen Goods."

During the Civil War, the Rockland Print Works made uniforms for the Union Army. The Garnerville Railroad was a spur that ran from the print works to the New Jersey and New York Railroad at Miner's Creek.

In 1840, Resolve Waldron and Charles Benson established a chemical factory for the manufacture of pyroligneous acid, much used in calico printing. The business closed in 1843, but was revived the following year by William Knight at a location near Cedar Pond.

The Garnerville post office was established in June 1875; John D. Norris was US postmaster for the hamlet.

=== Historical markers ===
- Calico Hill - 31 West Railroad Avenue
- Garner Works - 55 West Railroad Avenue

=== Landmarks and places of interest ===
- Garner Mansion Site - Railroad Avenue
- King's Daughters Public Library - 10 W. Ramapo Road
- Garnerville Arts and Industrial Center - 55 W. Railroad Avenue. This is a not-for-profit art center with over 14,000 square feet (1,300 m^{2}) of unique performance and exhibition space. The center is in a landmark pre-Civil War factory complex.
- The town of Haverstraw rename a portion of Route 202 as the Hector L. Soto Memorial Highway.Héctor L. Soto (1946-2023) was a Vietnam War veteran (Sergeant), member of the Haverstraw Police Department for 36 years, and Town Councilman.

=== Notable people ===
- JG Faherty (1961-present) - Author of horror, dark fiction, thrillers, and science fiction. Several of his novels, novellas, and short stories are set in Garnerville or the surrounding North Rockland area.
