= Academy of the Holy Names (Albany, New York) =

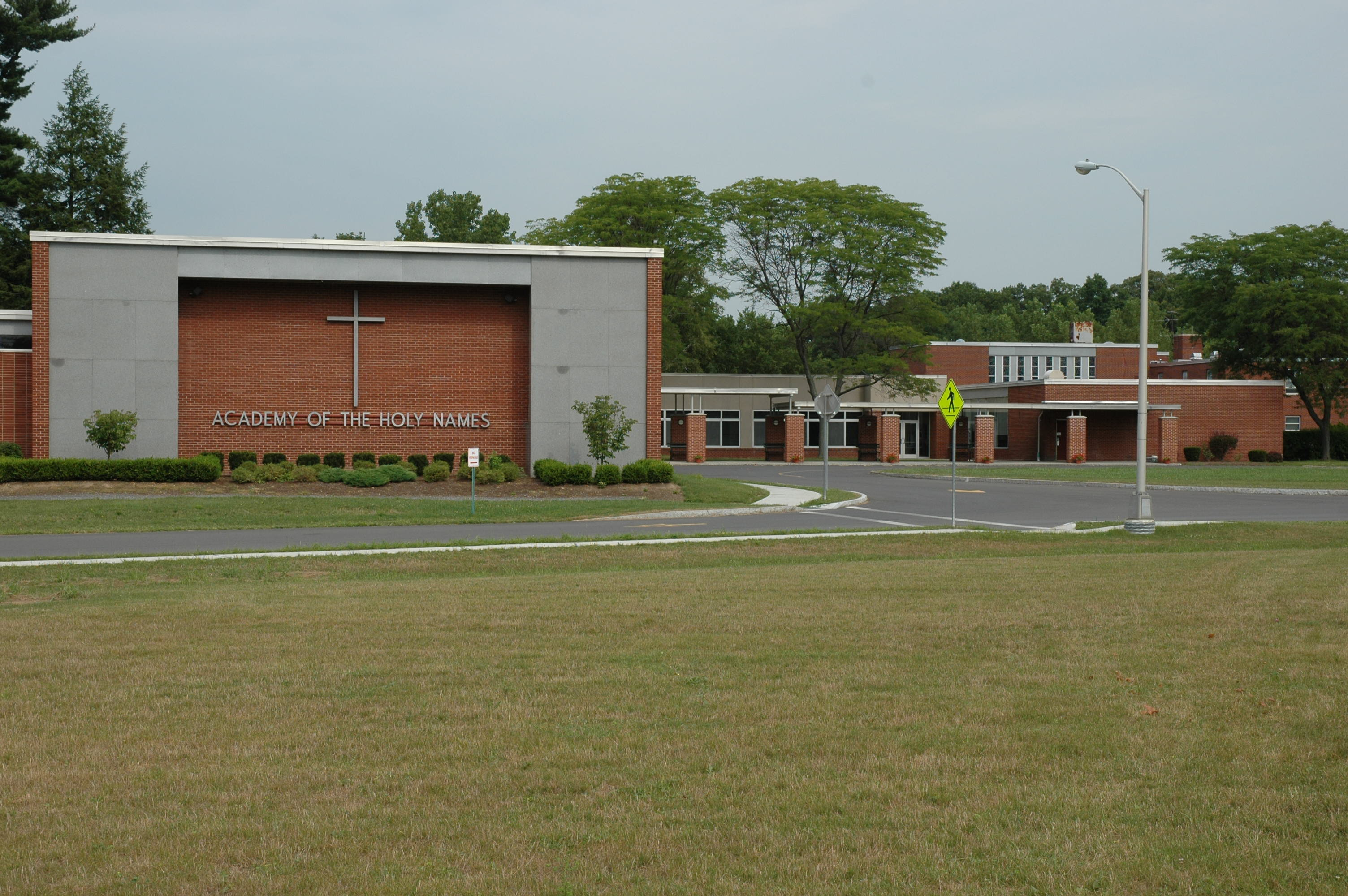

Location
- 1073 New Scotland Road; Albany, (Albany County), New York 12208; United States; 42°39′4″N 73°50′8″W

Information
- Type: Private, all-female
- Motto: Esse Quam Videri ("To Be rather than to Seem")
- Religious affiliations: Roman Catholic; Sisters of the Holy Names of Jesus and Mary
- Established: 1884
- President: Martin Kilbridge
- Principal: Margaret Taranto
- Grades: High School Grades 9 to 12, Middle School Grades 6 to 8
- Enrollment: 232 (2024–2025)
- Colors: Navy blue and gold
- Athletics conference: Colonial Council Athletics Conference
- Mascot: Panthers
- Accreditation: Middle States Association of Colleges and Schools
- Publication: Spectrum (literary/art journal)
- Newspaper: Academy Courier
- Yearbook: Profile
- Website: http://www.ahns.org

Academy of the Holy Names, or AHN, in Albany, New York, United States, is an independent, Middle States accredited Catholic girls' college-preparatory school for girls in grades 6–12. It is located within the Roman Catholic Diocese of Albany. The school was founded in 1884 by the Sisters of the Holy Names of Jesus and Mary. The mission of AHN is to prepare its students to become cultural, intellectual, moral, and spiritual leaders. Current enrollment for the 2024–2025 school year is 232 students.

== History ==
Academy of the Holy Names has been a preparatory school in the Albany area for over a century, having first opened its doors as the Academy of Notre Dame on September 10, 1884.

The school was first located on Hamilton Street in Albany, but less than a year after its opening, the Sisters of the Holy Names of Jesus and Mary purchased property at 628 Madison Avenue and began preparations to move the academy. By June 1890, Regents examinations had been given for the first time, and three students had become the first graduating class. It was not until 1899 that the academy established by the Sisters became known as The Academy of the Holy Names.

In 1922, the Sisters purchased the Hennessey Farm on New Scotland Road, but it was not until 1957 that a school building was placed on the property. In that year, the Sisters opened a new high school building for grades 9 through 12 at 1075 New Scotland Road. The Madison Avenue building still housed the grade school and junior high. The Primary School moved to New scotland Road in 1968. Kindergarten was added in 1968 and Pre-K was added in 1991.

In January 2016, it was announced that Academy of the Holy Names would discontinue Pre-K through 5th grade education at the end of the 2015–2016 academic year due to declining enrollment. Academy of the Holy Names continues to flourish as a 6-12th grade institution.

== Traditions ==
=== School Prayer ===
This is said every morning during announcements, after a reading from Scripture:

"Blessed Mother Marie Rose, we firmly believe in the power of your intercession with almighty God: Father, Son, and Holy Spirit. We beg you to hear our humble prayers and to obtain for us the favors which we now ask in the silence of our hearts. God, our father, knows all, can do all things, and loves us. Sure of God’s love and strong in our faith, together with you, Blessed Mother Marie Rose, we accept God’s most holy will. Through Jesus Christ. Amen."

== Notable past students ==
- Kirsten Gillibrand, one-term Democratic Representative of the state's 20th congressional district (2007-2009) and current United States Senator (since 2009)
- Paige DeSorbo, reality television personality on the show Summer House on Bravo.
- Teressa Foglia, '06, entrepreneur and fashion hat maker.
- Vice Admiral Nancy S. Lacore, '86, Commandant, Naval District, Washington (2022-2024).

== See also ==
- List of high schools in New York State
- List of Catholic schools in New York
