= Dominican Sisters of Sparkill =

The Dominican Congregation of Our Lady of the Rosary, better known as the Dominican Sisters of Sparkill, is an institute of religious sisters of the Third Order of Saint Dominic based in Sparkill, New York, which was founded in 1876. The congregation developed to care for indigent women but now works primarily in education as well.

== History ==
The congregation was established through the charitable work of two sisters, Alice Mary and Lucy Thorpe, who had emigrated from England and settled in New York City. They converted from the Anglican Church in which they had been raised to the Catholic Church. Becoming aware of the needs of poor and homeless women in the city, they began to serve their needs.

Eventually the Thorpe sisters resolved to commit themselves more formally to this service by embracing religious life, and they established the congregation on May 6, 1876, under the leadership of Alice Mary, who took the religious name of Mother Catherine M. Antoninus, O.S.D. She led the congregation for the next twenty years. During this period, the focus of the Sisters' work shifted from caring from adults to childcare, with the opening of St. Joseph Home.

After the death of Alice Mary on 2 March 1879, her sister became the prioress but resigned as she lacked the administrative skills. On 9 April 1880, the community had repeated failed ballots to elect a successor, leading to the archbishop's vicar general, Monsignor William Quinn, appointing Margaret Dowling, Sister Mary Dominic, prioress for three years. At the time she was a lay sister and the convent's cook. This appointment led to 14 of the 22 members leaving, with just 8 professed sisters remaining, all of whom had Irish surnames. Dowling was considered the re-founder of the order at this point and on 11 August 1880 applied for the incorporation of the Dominican Congregation of Our Lady of the Rosary. Due to the impoverished state of the community in 1880, Quinn banned the admission of any new members until the community was financially secure. Under Dowling's leadership, that ban was lifted in 1882, and by 1895 the community had grown to 71 professed sisters, 15 novices and postulants.

In 1884 the Sisters determined to move the children under their care and opened St. Agnes Home for Boys on the grounds of their motherhouse in the rural town of Sparkill. They also opened St. Agatha Home in Nanuet, New York. Both facilities closed in the mid-1970s.

The Sisters also began to work in education, teaching in various parishes of the Archdiocese of New York in which they were based, especially in the Bronx, with its marked development during the 1920s. One example of this work was St. Martin's Academy which they opened in 1900 to serve the children of St. Martin of Tours Parish. When the parish opened its own parochial school in 1922, the Sisters converted the facility into a two-year business school to train young women, who were being offered a new range of careers in the years after World War I. A decade later, the decision was made that providing a good secondary education would be of more help to young women. The existing building was demolished to comply with the demands of the New York Board of Regents and Aquinas High School was opened in September 1939.

With the population growth of the suburban area surrounding New York City, Cardinal Francis Spellman asked the Dominican Sisters of Sparkill to provide greater educational opportunity to the children of Rockland County. To answer this request, they opened Albertus Magnus High School in Bardonia, New York in 1957.

The Dominican Sisters of Sparkill also serve at Catholic schools in Florida, Illinois, Missouri and Montana.

The Sisters opened schools in Pakistan in 1958, where they have worked together with the Dominican friars since then.

== Notable sisters ==
- Jean M. Marshall received the Eleanor Roosevelt Human Rights Award from President Bill Clinton in 1999.
- Lucy Eaton Smith, who became the foundress of the Dominican Sisters of St. Catherine de' Ricci in 1880, was a member of their congregation in 1876.

== Current status ==
The Dominican Sisters have expanded into a number of other forms of service, including providing senior housing on the grounds of the motherhouse in Sparkill. Today they number some 350 women.

In 2011, the Sisters entered into an agreement with Scenic Hudson, a not-for-profit environmental organization, to create "the Falling Waters Preserve" on land near Glasco in the town of Saugerties. The property, owned by the sisters since the 1930s, had been used as a vacation and retreat site. Three miles of trails, with benches and gazebos, were added to enhance public use. The Esopus Creek Conservancy assisted with trail design and maintenance. At the end of the five-year agreement, the sisters sold 149 acres to Scenic Hudson so that the Preserve would be shared and maintained in perpetuity.

== Educational institutions ==
Secondary

- Albertus Magnus High School, Bardonia, New York
- Aquinas High School, New York City
- St. Edmund Preparatory School, New York City (sponsored 1932-1986)

Tertiary

- St. Thomas Aquinas College, Sparkill, New York
