= Saint Joseph School (Endicott, New York) =

St. Joseph School

Location
- 210 N. Jackson Avenue; Endicott, NY 13760
- Coordinates: 42°06′46″N 76°02′26″W

Information
- School type: Catholic
- Denomination: Roman Catholic
- Patron saint: St. Joseph
- Status: Open
- School district: Catholic Schools of Broome County
- Principal: Angela Tierno (Formally Sister Denise Marie)
- Teaching staff: 13 (as of 2005-06)
- Grades: Preschool–8
- Gender: Mixed
- Enrollment: 129 (as of 2005–06)
- Student to teacher ratio: 10.1

St. Joseph School was a Catholic school in Endicott, New York. 2009 was its final year of operation.

== See also ==
- List of Catholic schools in New York
