= Margaret Dowling =

Mother Mary Dominic Margaret Dowling

Personal life
- Born: 1853 Ballyconra, County Kilkenny, Ireland
- Died: 14 July 1900 (aged 46–47) St Agnes Convent, Sparkill, New York, United States

Religious life
- Religion: Christian
- Order: Dominican Sisters of Sparkill

Margaret Dowling or Mother Mary Dominic (1853 – 14 July 1900) was an Irish-American Dominican nun and foundress.

== Early life ==
Margaret Dowling was born in Ballyconra, County Kilkenny. Her parents were Edward and Elizabeth Dowling. She attended school locally, and emigrated to New York in 1869. She entered the Dominican Congregation of the Holy Rosary on 23 June 1876, the order having been founded on 6 May 1876. On 8 December 1876 she received the Dominican habit and took the name Sister Mary Dominic. She professed on 8 December 1878.

== Career ==
When the foundress of the order died on 2 March 1879, her successor, her sister, was removed from office after a year due to a lack of administrative skills. The order went through a number of failed ballots to elect the successor on 9 April 1880, with the archbishop's vicar general, Monsignor William Quinn, appointing Dowling prioress for three years. At the time she was a lay sister and the convent's cook. Her appointment led to 14 of the 22 members leaving. Dowling became the re-founder of the community. The congregation had very little income, and the vicar general refused to allow the entrance of new nuns until the community was financially secure. During this time members were free to join another congregation or to return to secular life, with the 8 remaining professed sisters all having Irish surnames. The division between the lay sisters and the choir remained.

Dowling became an American citizen on 13 June 1880, and on 11 August 1880 applied for the incorporation of the Dominican Congregation of Our Lady of the Rosary, which later became known as the Dominican Sisters of Sparkill. In 1882, the ban on the admission of new members was lifted, and by 1895 the community had grown to 71 professed sisters, 15 novices and postulants. Dowling led the congregations from 1880 to 1892, and from 1897 to 1900. During this time money was raised to build a convent, an orphanage, and a refuge for women all of which were opened in November 1881. In 1892, the community opened a home for children of colour in Rye, New York, and in 1897 a home for babies in the Bronx.

The order founded new convents in the archdioceses of New York and St Louis as well as the dioceses of Albany, Brooklyn, Jefferson City, Rockville Centre, Syracuse, and Wilmington. They founded 52 schools in New York City and State, and 21 schools in Missouri. They opened a teacher training college for religious sisters in Sparkill, Troy and in the Bronx they founded a commercial school.

Dowling died on 14 July 1900 at St Agnes Convent, Sparkill, and is buried in the convent cemetery. In 1995 the Order opened the Dowling Gardens, an independent living residential community for senior citizens, named in her memory.
