= Academy of Saint Joseph =

Location
- 1725 Brentwood Road; Brentwood, (Suffolk County), New York 11717; United States; 40°46′24″N 73°14′30″W

Information
- Type: Private
- Motto: Ad Astra Per Ardua (To the stars through adversity.)
- Religious affiliation: Roman Catholic
- Established: 1856
- Closed: 2009
- President: Sr. Eileen Kelly
- Principal: Sr. Kerry Handal
- Grades: K-12
- Gender: Coeducational (K-8); Girls (9-12)
- Enrollment: 250 (high school) (2008)
- Campus size: 200 acres (0.81 km^{2})
- Colors: Red and White
- Sports: Soccer, Basketball, Badminton, Track, Softball, Swimming, Tennis, Equestrian, Volleyball
- Mascot: Dragon
- Accreditation: Middle States Association of Colleges and Schools
- Newspaper: Campanile
- Yearbook: In the Pines
- Admissions Director: Diane Sabbatino
- Athletic Director: Chris Donello
- Website: http://www.asjli.org

The Academy of Saint Joseph, in Brentwood, New York, was a Catholic college-preparatory school for Kindergarten to Grade 12, single-sex for girls grades 9 - 12. The academy was founded in 1856, by the Sisters of Saint Joseph named after Saint Joseph. At the request of the Bishop of Brooklyn, Mother Austin Kean came from Philadelphia to Brooklyn to found what is now the Sisters of St. Joseph of Brentwood, New York. She was accompanied by Sister Baptista Hanson and Sister Theodosia Hegeman from Buffalo. It closed in 2009, after a 153-year history of educating the youth of Brooklyn, Queens and Long Island.

Situated on a 200-acre (0.81 km^{2}) campus, it was accredited by the New York State Board of Regents and by the Middle States Association of Colleges and Schools and held full membership in the New York State Association of Independent Schools and the National Catholic Educational Association. It was operated independent of the Roman Catholic Diocese of Rockville Centre. The Academy of St. Joseph had been having financial problems for over a decade before its closure.

== Lower school ==
The Lower School was staffed by a highly qualified lay and religious faculty. Small class sizes provided frequent interaction between teacher and student. In addition to the grade level teacher, there were special teachers in the fields of Music, Visual Art, Romance Languages, and Physical Education. The curriculum offered in the Lower School was child-centered, integrative, holistic, and exceeded NYS Learning Standards. Emphasis on literacy and whole language began in Kindergarten and continued throughout the grades.

== Middle school ==
The Middle School provided for girls and boys grades 6 - 8 an intermediate level of study before high school. Guided by the CSJ Mission Statement, the students developed a sense of tolerance, acceptance and respect for themselves and each other. Caring faculty challenged students in subject classes scheduled in collaboration with the secondary division. Class meetings, field trips, ceremonies and celebrations fostered a sense of community.

== High school ==
The High School curriculum of the Academy of St. Joseph for grades 9-12 was college preparatory. Emphasis was placed on the development of skill in the process of learning as well as on the academic content. A number of traditions encouraged camaraderie among the academy's young women. A feature of the curriculum was the four-year Humanities program which integrated Art, Music, History and Literature. Advanced Placement Courses were scheduled in American and European History, Art, English, Chemistry, Biology and Calculus.

"The high school amplified the abilities of the young women that attended by having small intimate class in which time with the teacher was individualized."

"The large amount of land that the school sat on made physical education fun and exciting."

== Honor Societies ==
National Honor Society, National Junior Society, National Art Honor Society, Spanish Honor Society, French Honor Society, Latin Honor Society, Math Honor Society, Tri-M Music Honor Society.

== See also ==
- List of high schools in New York State
- List of Catholic schools in New York
