= Rick Cabrera =

American basketball coach (born 1976)

Current position
- Title: Head coach
- Team: Northwestern State
- Conference: Southland
- Record: 35–61 (.365)

Biographical details
- Born: December 4, 1976 (age 49); Spring Valley, New York, U.S.

Playing career
- 1994–1995: Kemper Military School
- 1995–1996: Vincennes
- 1996–1998: Tennessee Tech
- Position: Guard

Coaching career (HC unless noted)
- 1998–1999: Volunteer Christian (TN) (assistant)
- 1999–2000: Tennessee Tech (GA)
- 2001–2002: Miami Killian HS (FL) (assistant)
- 2002–2004: Keystone College (assistant)
- 2004–2008: Lackawanna CC
- 2008–2012: Chattanooga (assistant)
- 2012–2017: Tennessee Tech (assistant)
- 2017–2019: Austin Peay (assistant)
- 2019–2021: Arkansas State (assistant)
- 2021–2023: Tallahassee CC
- 2023–present: Northwestern State

Head coaching record
- Overall: 35–61 (.365) (NCAA); 152–45 (.772) (NJCAA)

Accomplishments and honors

Championships
- 3x Region XIX Regular Season (2005-07), Region XIX Conference Tournament (2005), 2x Region VIII Conference Tournament (2022, 2023), Panhandle Conference Champion (2023)

Hugo Ricardo Cabrera Jr. (born December 4, 1976) is an American basketball coach who is the current head coach of the Northwestern State Demons men's basketball team.

== Early life and education ==
Cabrera grew up in Spring Valley, New York, and graduated from Albertus Magnus High School in 1994.

After high school, Cabrera played junior college basketball for two seasons, first at Kemper Military School in 1994–95, then at Vincennes University in 1995–96. At Vincennes, he was teammates with future NBA players Shawn Marion and Tyrone Nesby. In 1996, Cabrera transferred to Tennessee Tech, where in two seasons he played 49 games and averaged 6.8 points, 1.5 rebounds, and 1.6 assists as a guard. Cabrera completed his bachelor's degree in multidisciplinary studies in 1999 and master's degree in instructional leadership in 2001, both at Tennessee Tech.

== Coaching career ==
=== Early coaching career (1998–2004) ===
From 1998 to 1999, Cabrera was head boys' basketball coach and athletics director at Volunteer Christian Academy in Sparta, Tennessee.

In 1999, Cabrera returned to Tennessee Tech to be a graduate assistant for one season under head coach Jeff Lebo. From 2001 to 2002, Cabrera was an assistant basketball coach at Miami Killian Senior High School.

From 2002 to 2004, Cabrera was an assistant coach at Keystone College.

=== Lackawanna (2004–2008) ===
Then from 2004 to 2008, Cabrera was head coach at Lackawanna College. In four years he guided Lackawanna to a 100–29 record as well as three regular season titles and two conference tournament titles.

=== Division I assistant (2008–2021) ===
Returning to the NCAA Division I coaching ranks, Cabrera was an assistant at Chattanooga from 2008 to 2012 under head coach John Shulman, who was previously an assistant at Tennessee Tech. With Cabrera as an assistant, Chattanooga won two Southern Conference division titles and the 2009 Southern Conference Tournament, also appearing in the 2009 NCAA Tournament.

On June 1, 2012, Cabrera began a second stint as assistant coach at Tennessee Tech, this time under head coach Steve Payne.

Then on May 8, 2017, Cabrera joined the staff of Matt Figger as an assistant coach at Austin Peay.

On May 8, 2019, Cabrera became an assistant at Arkansas State under Mike Balado.

=== Tallahassee Community College (2021–2023) ===
In 2021, Cabrera returned to the junior college ranks as a head coach with Tallahassee Community College where in two seasons he guided the team to a 52–16 overall record, inincluding a conference championship, their third in four seasons, and an appearance in the NJCAA Division I Tournament national semifinal in 2023.

=== Northwestern State (2023–present) ===
On March 22, 2023, Cabrera was named the 11th head coach in Northwestern State men's basketball history, replacing Corey Gipson who departed for the head coaching position at Austin Peay.

== Personal ==
Cabrera's father Hugo Cabrera Sr., was a 10th round pick of the Milwaukee Bucks in the 1976 NBA draft and represented the Dominican Republic in various international competitions.

== Head coaching record ==
=== NCAA DI ===
Record table
| Season | Team | Overall | Conference | Standing | Postseason |
|---|---|---|---|---|---|
Northwestern State Demons (Southland Conference) (2023–present)
| 2023–24 | Northwestern State | 9–23 | 7–11 | 6th | |
| 2024–25 | Northwestern State | 16–16 | 12–8 | T-4th | |
| 2025–26 | Northwestern State | 10–22 | 8–14 | T-7th | |
| Northwestern State: | | 35–61 (.365) | 27–33 (.450) | | |
| Total: | | 35–61 (.365) | | | |
National champion Postseason invitational champion Conference regular season champion Conference regular season and conference tournament champion Division regular season champion Division regular season and conference tournament champion Conference tournament champion

=== Junior college ===
Record table
| Season | Team | Overall | Conference | Standing | Postseason |
|---|---|---|---|---|---|
Lackawanna Falcons (Region XIX) (2004–2008)
| 2004–05 | Lackawanna | 29–4 | | | NJCAA district playoffs |
| 2005–06 | Lackawanna | 23–9 | | | |
| 2006–07 | Lackawanna | 22–8 | | | |
| 2007–08 | Lackawanna | 22–9 | | | NJCAA regional semifinals |
| Lackawanna: | | 102–30 (.773) | | | |
Tallahassee Eagles (FSCAA Panhandle) (2021–2023)
| 2021–22 | Tallahassee CC | 21–10 | 6–6 | 3rd | |
| 2022–23 | Tallahassee CC | 31–6 | 9–3 | T–1st | NJCAA Division I Final Four |
| Tallahassee CC: | | 52–16 (.765) | 15–9 (.625) | | |
| Total: | | 154–46 (.770) | | | |
National champion Postseason invitational champion Conference regular season champion Conference regular season and conference tournament champion Division regular season champion Division regular season and conference tournament champion Conference tournament champion
