= St. Joseph Hill Academy =

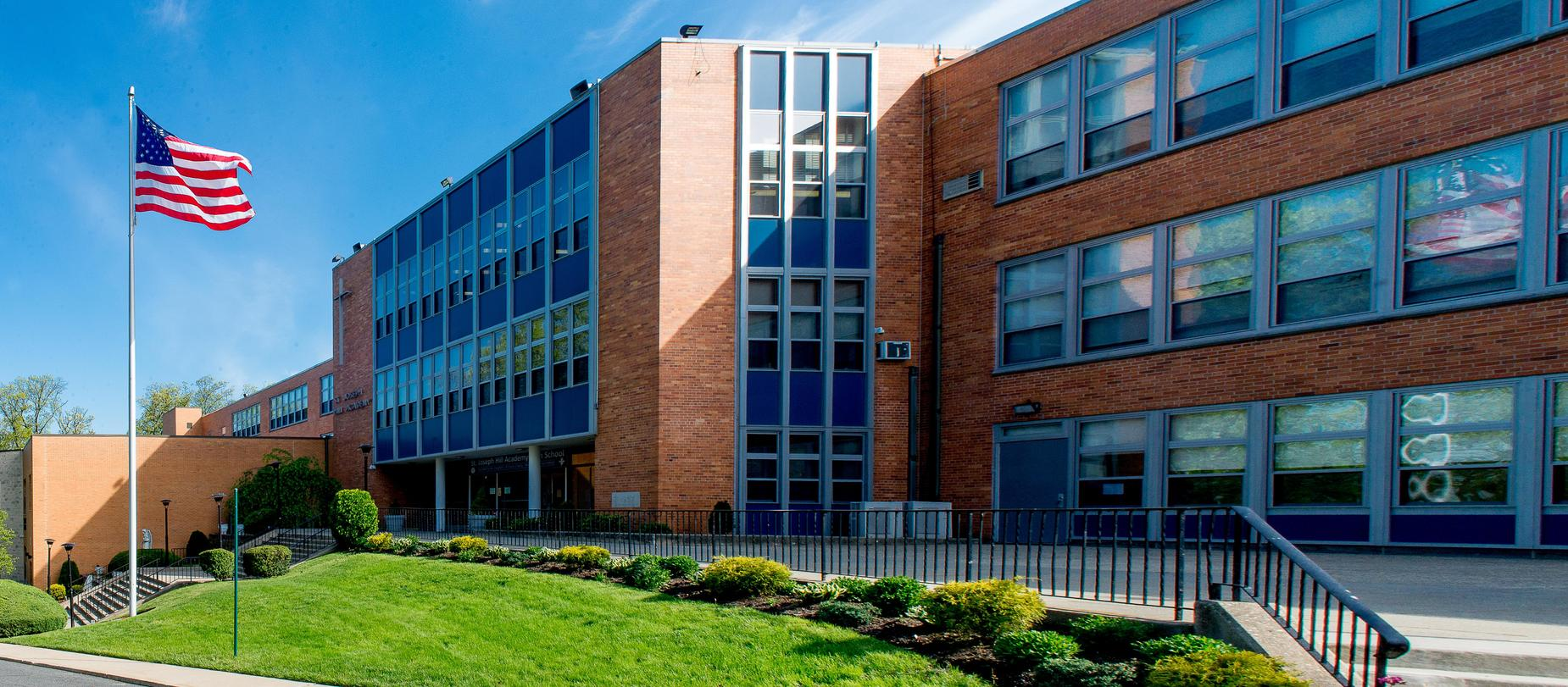
- Early 21st century

Location
- 850 Hylan Boulevard (Arrochar) Staten Island, New York 10305; United States

Information
- Type: Private
- Motto: Summum Bonum
- Religious affiliations: Roman Catholic; Daughters of Divine Charity
- Patron saint: Saint Joseph
- Established: 1919 (107 years ago)
- Founder: Daughters of Divine Charity
- Grades: Pre-K 3 – 12
- Campus size: 14 acres (57,000 m^{2})
- Campus type: Suburban
- Colors: Blue and white
- Mascot: Koala
- Team name: Hilltoppers
- Accreditation: Middle States Association of Colleges and Schools
- Website: stjosephhillacademy.com

St. Joseph Hill Academy is an American private Pre-K 3 through 12th grade Catholic school, located in the Arrochar neighborhood of Staten Island, New York.

Located on a scenic 14-acre (57,000 m^{2}) campus (which eponymously stands atop a hill, providing views of the Manhattan skyline), the elementary school is coeducational and serves 500+ students from Pre-K 3 through 8th grade and the high school is all-girls with approximately 400 young women in the 9th through 12th grades.

The school was founded and is operated by the Daughters of Divine Charity, although the school is independent of the Roman Catholic Archdiocese of New York.

The schools is accredited by the Middle States Association of Colleges and Schools.

The elementary school principal is Mr. Lawrence Hansen, the high school principal is Dr. Kristin Sherwood, and the president is Sr. Mary Coffelt, FDC.

== History ==
The school began in March 1919, with the purchase of the 14-acre (57,000 m^{2}) estate of William Knauth by Reverend Mother M. Kostka Bauer. In May of that year, the Daughters of Divine Charity arrived on Staten Island and in the fall inaugurated tutoring classes for a group of twenty-five children who had come to them during the summer. These classes led to the institution of the academy. During the school's early years, it was also a boarding school.

The school's first secondary-level classes were begun in 1930, and the first official commencement exercises were held for six high school graduates in June 1934. At that time, the school was affiliated with the Catholic University of America, Washington, D.C.

In 1938, the high school department received its charter of recognition and full accreditation from the Board of Regents of the University of the State of New York.

Since its foundation, multiple projects have been undertaken to provide for the ever-growing needs of the academy. The rapid pace of the school's growth was the prime factor which influenced Mother M. Fidelis Babos, then Provincial Superior of the Daughters of Divine Charity, to formulate plans for the erection of a new high school wing. The new wing was added to the already-existing elementary school building, which had been dedicated in 1953. Accordingly, on August 26, 1956, the groundbreaking ceremony took place for the erection of the present building. On March 23, 1957, Most Reverend Joseph M. Pernicone, Auxiliary Bishop of New York, laid the cornerstone. The formal dedication of the high school building took place on May 22, 1958, conducted by Francis Cardinal Spellman, Archbishop of New York.

A construction project began in 1999 was completed during the 2000–2001 school year. A new gymnasium, four additional high school classrooms and a distance-learning lab, to enhance the WITAC (Women Integrating Technology And Curriculum) program, were added to the facilities.

In 2009, the annex building Madonna Hall was added, named after the Virgin Mary. Madonna Hall has been transformed into a fully functioning art studio.
