= St. Catharine Academy =

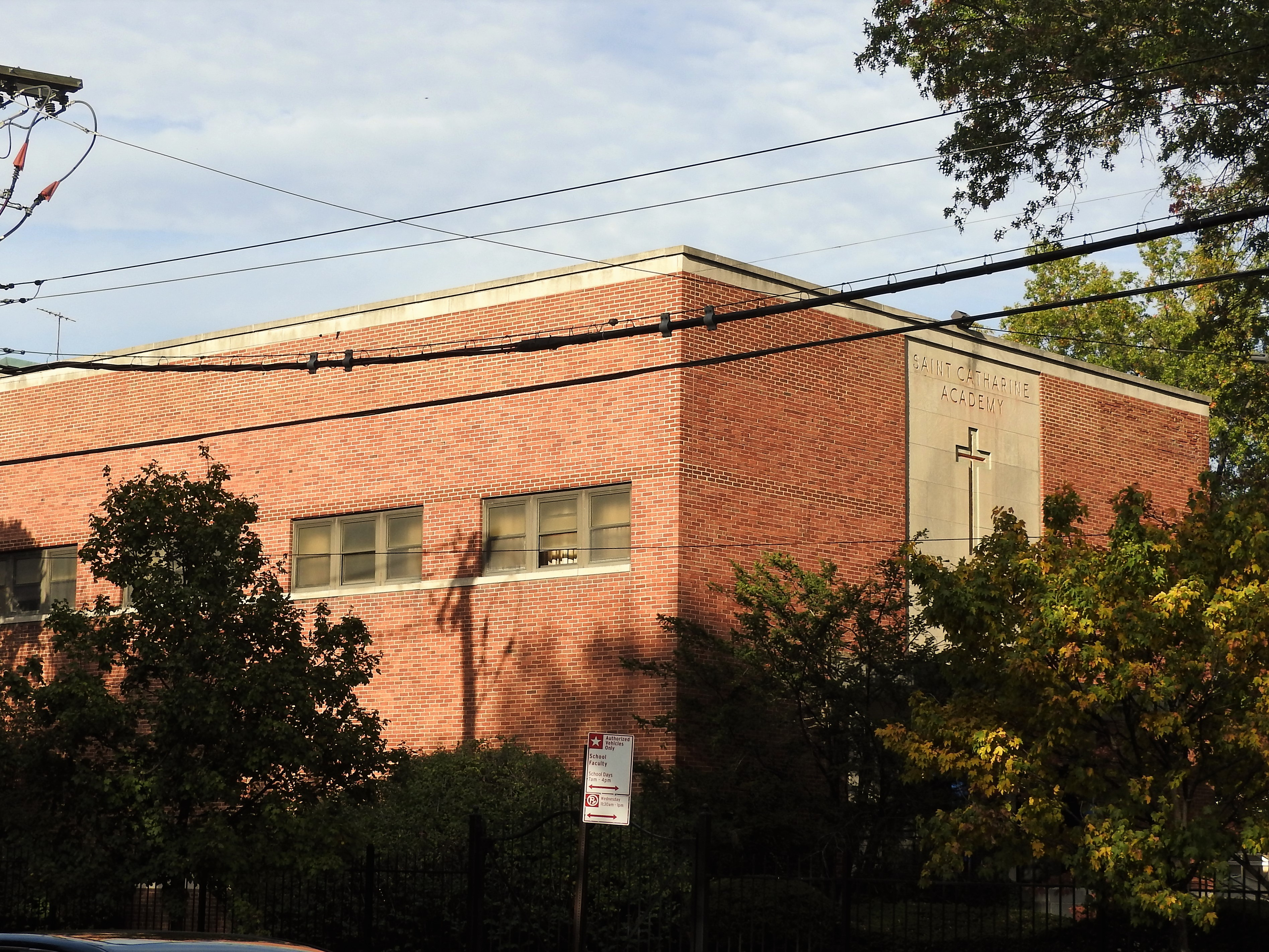

Location
- 2250 Williamsbridge Road; Pelham Gardens, Bronx, New York 10469; United States; 40°51′32″N 73°51′24″W

Information
- Type: Private, all-female
- Religious affiliations: Roman Catholic; Sisters of Mercy
- Patron saint: Catharine of Genoa
- Established: 1889 (137 years ago)
- President: Sr. Patricia Wolf
- Principal: Sr. Ann Welch
- Grades: 6–12
- Student to teacher ratio: 17:1
- Colors: Blue and gold
- Mascot: Husky
- Team name: Huskies
- Rival: Preston High School; former Aquinas High School
- Accreditation: Middle States Association of Colleges and Schools
- Publication: Through the Looking Glass
- Newspaper: The Phoenix
- Tuition: $10,000 (2019–2020)
- Website: scahs.org

St. Catharine High School is an American all-girls', private, Roman Catholic high school located in the Pelham Gardens neighborhood of the Bronx, New York.

It is located within the Roman Catholic Archdiocese of New York.

== History ==
The Sisters of Mercy, founded by Mother Catherine McAuley in Dublin, Ireland, opened an academy in the Washington Heights section of Manhattan in New York City in September 1889.

The classes included grades 1 through 12.

At that time, the first academy resembled the large estates which surrounded it. Toward the end of the 19th century, as registration increased, the sisters erected a new building across the street at 539 West 152nd Street.

In 1900, the University of the State of New York granted a Regents charter to the school.

The rapid growth of the area and the great increase in enrollment showed the inadequacy of the accommodations. The elementary grades in the academy were discontinued and these classrooms were used for high school students.

Facilities were not sufficient even with this change, so it was necessary to build a much larger school. In the fall of 1953 the old building was sold and the academy moved to its present location at 2250 Williamsbridge Road. The school continues to undergo a series of renovations and improvements.

As of 2019, the school's enrollment was approximately 500 girls.

== Sponsorship and fees ==
The school is sponsored by the Sisters of Mercy of the Regional Community of New York.

== Accreditation ==
The school is chartered by the Board of Regents of the University of the State of New York and is accredited by the Middle States Association of Colleges and Schools, the Mercy Secondary Education Association and the National Catholic Educational Association.

== Sports ==
The school offers sports, including junior varsity and varsity basketball; junior varsity and varsity cheerleading; varsity soccer; varsity softball; and junior varsity and varsity volleyball.

The school colors are blue and gold.

== Notable alumnae ==
- June Allyson (1917–2006) – actress
- Margaret Bourke-White (1904–1971) – photographer
- Ann Dvorak (1911-1979) – actress
- Grace Paley (1922–2007) – award-winning short-story writer
- Amanda Serrano (born 1988) – International Boxing Federation female world super featherweight champion boxer
- Marjorie Velázquez (born 1981) – New York City councilwoman
