= Joseph Clinton =

American engineer

Joseph D. Clinton had a long professional association with Buckminster Fuller. In 1970, Clinton worked in the School of Technology at Southern Illinois University, where Fuller taught, and researched papers on the mathematics involved with geodesics, contracted and published by NASA in 1971. Some five years later, Clinton founded Clinton International Design Consultants, an interdisciplinary design and consulting firm based on the philosophy of what he termed "the structures field of Design Science." Clinton’s work has specialised in environmentally sensitive design systems, incorporating elements such as solar and wind structures and systems. His firm did work contributing to such structures as the Omni Max Theater for Expo 86 in Vancouver, British Columbia, Canada, and the Epcot Center’s Horizon Omnisphere Theater.
