= Aquinas High School (New York) =

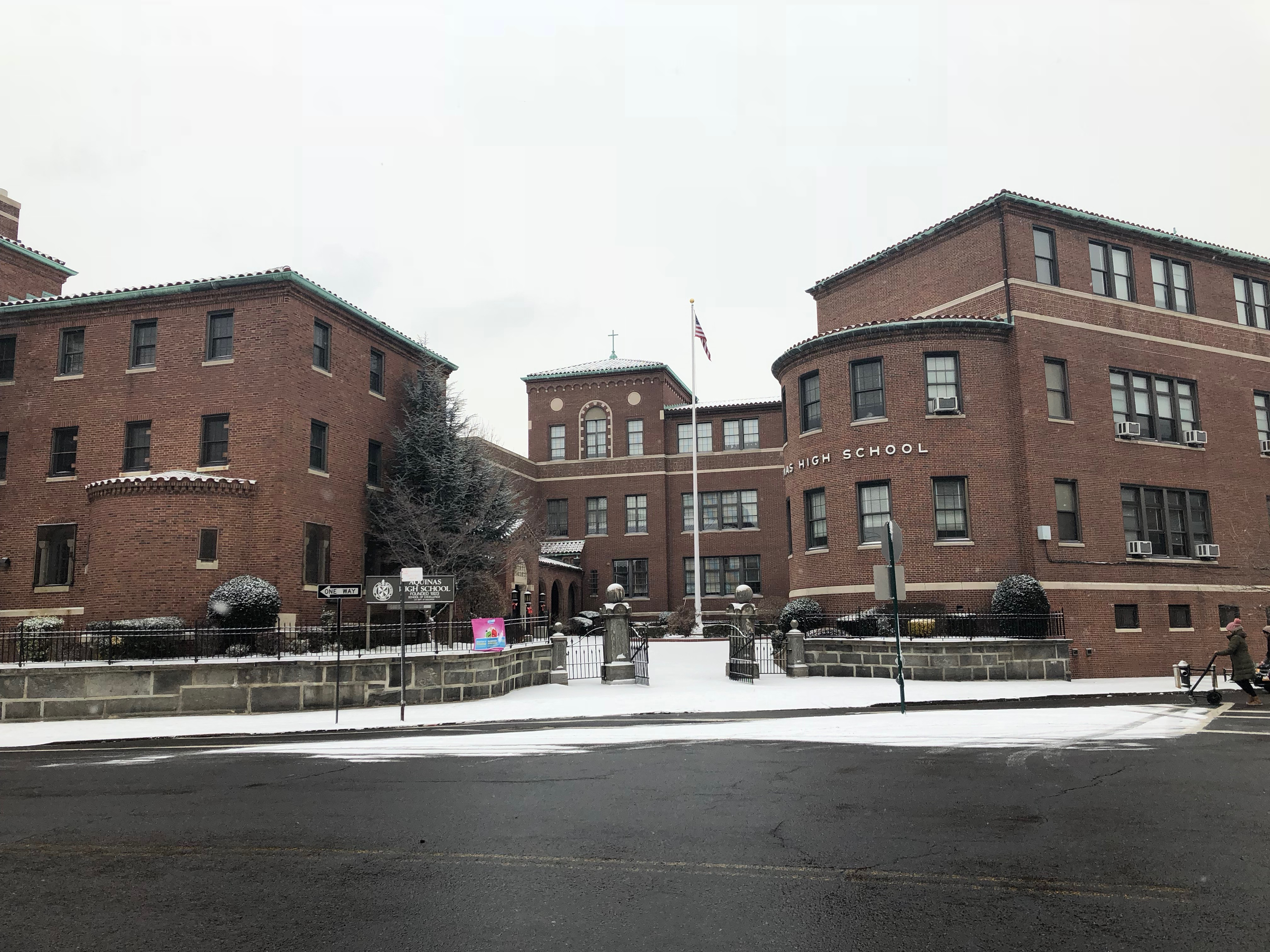

Location
- 685 East 182nd Street; New York City (Belmont, Bronx), New York 10457; United States
- 40.8513°N 73.8874°W

Information
- Type: Private
- Motto: Veritas (Truth)
- Religious affiliation: Roman Catholic
- Established: 1923; 103 years ago
- Founder: Mary Joseph, O.P.
- Closed: 2021
- Oversight: Roman Catholic Archdiocese of New York
- President: Anna E. Parra
- Principal: Mark A. Shultz
- Teaching staff: 30
- Grades: 9-12
- Gender: Girls
- Colors: Blue and gold
- Team name: Lady Bears
- Accreditation: Middle States Association of Colleges and Schools
- Publication: The Aquinite (literary magazine)
- Newspaper: Spirit of Aquinas
- Yearbook: Veritas
- Website: www.aquinashs.org

Aquinas High School was a 9-12 all-girls, private, Roman Catholic high school in the Belmont section of the Bronx, New York, United States. It was located within the Roman Catholic Archdiocese of New York.

The building now houses Cardinal Mccloskey Community Charter Elementary School.

== Background ==
In the late nineteenth century the Dominican Sisters of Sparkill purchased the Frederick Grote estate, which consisted of an entire city block from East 182 Street to East 183 Street. Frederick Grote was a partner in the firm "F. Grote & Co.", manufacturers of ivory goods. The business was located on 14th Street in Manhattan. Mr. Grote died October 22, 1886. In 1900, a day school was established in the three-story frame servants' house for children of the Parish of St. Martin of Tours. It was called St. Martin's Academy and only served grades 1–6. As enrollment increased, the academy was moved to the brick Victorian Grote mansion.

When the parish decided to establish a parochial school, in 1923, the sisters converted the academy into "Aquinas Hall", a two-year business school for young women. A second building was added in 1929. In the mid-1930s, it was determined that the students would be better served by a four year high school curriculum. A 4-year high school was established in 1939. On September 11, 2002, First Lady Laura Bush visited Aquinas High School.

In June 2020, the school announced that it would close following the 2020–2021 school year due to declining enrollment. While originally designed for 800 students, there were only 200 at the time the closing was announced. On June 10, 2021, Aquinas graduated its final class. The building is now home to Cardinal Mccloskey Community Charter School. It is an elementary school, serving members of the community

== Notable alumni ==
- Patricia Banks Edmiston, one of the first Black flight attendants in the United States
- April Lee Hernández, actress
- Debbi Morgan, actress
- Julissa Reynoso, former United States Ambassador to Uruguay
- Judy Torres, freestyle music artist and dance-pop singer
