= St. Ann, The Personal School =

Coordinates: 40.792627°N 73.939831°W

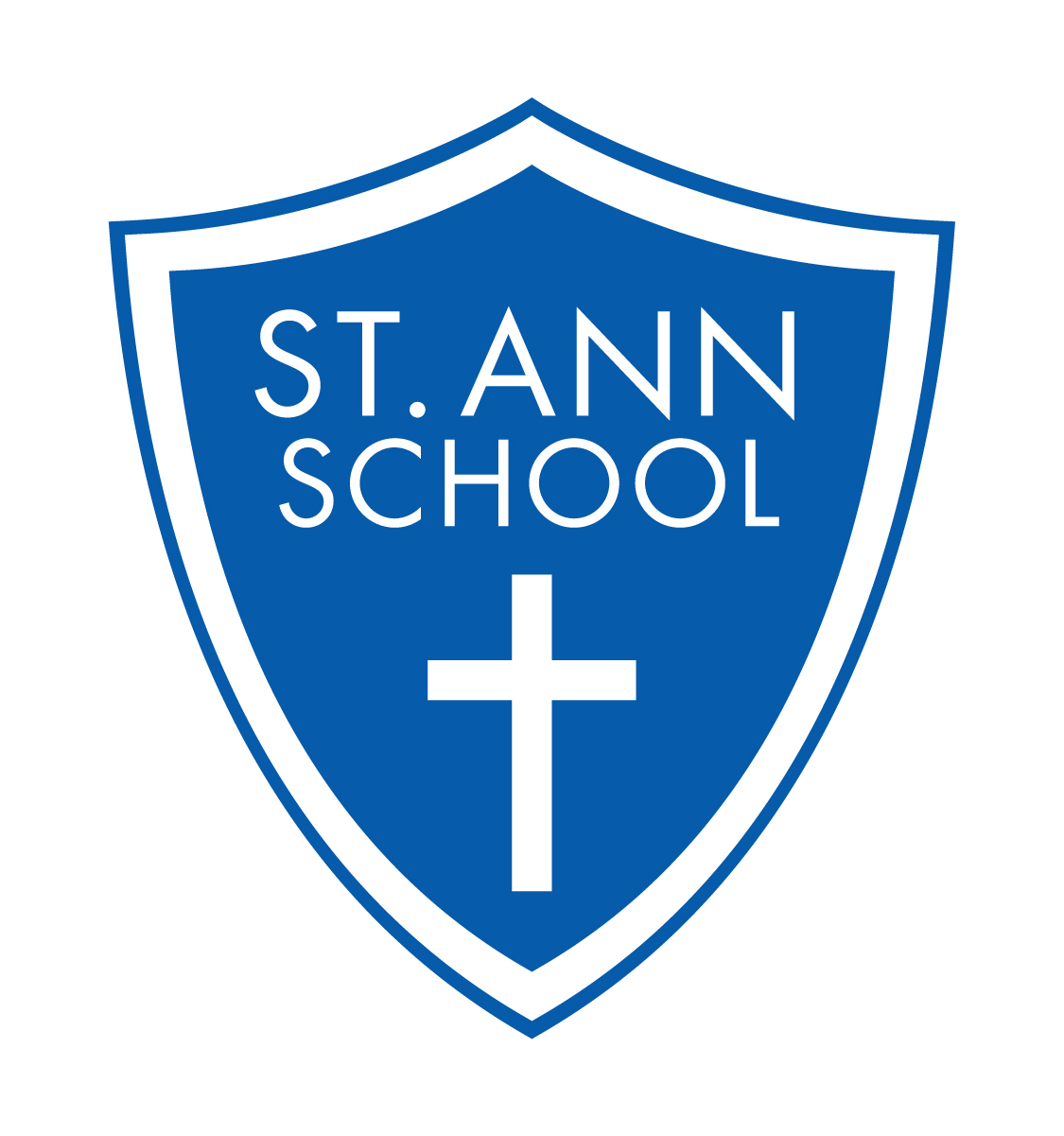

St. Ann, The Personal School was a Catholic pre-kindergarten and K–8 school in Upper Manhattan, located in East Harlem at 314 East 110th Street, New York City. It was founded in 1926 and affiliated with St. Ann Church (East Harlem). It was later merged with St. Paul's School, which led to the creation of the Academy of St. Paul and St. Ann at the start of the 2020-2021 academic year. The Academy of St. Paul and St. Ann will close following the end of the 2022-2023 academic year due to changing demographics and enrollment declines.
