= St. Martin of Tours' Church (Bronx) =

Catholic church in the Bronx, New York

Coordinates: 40°51′3.53″N 73°53′12.41″W

The Church of St. Martin of Tours
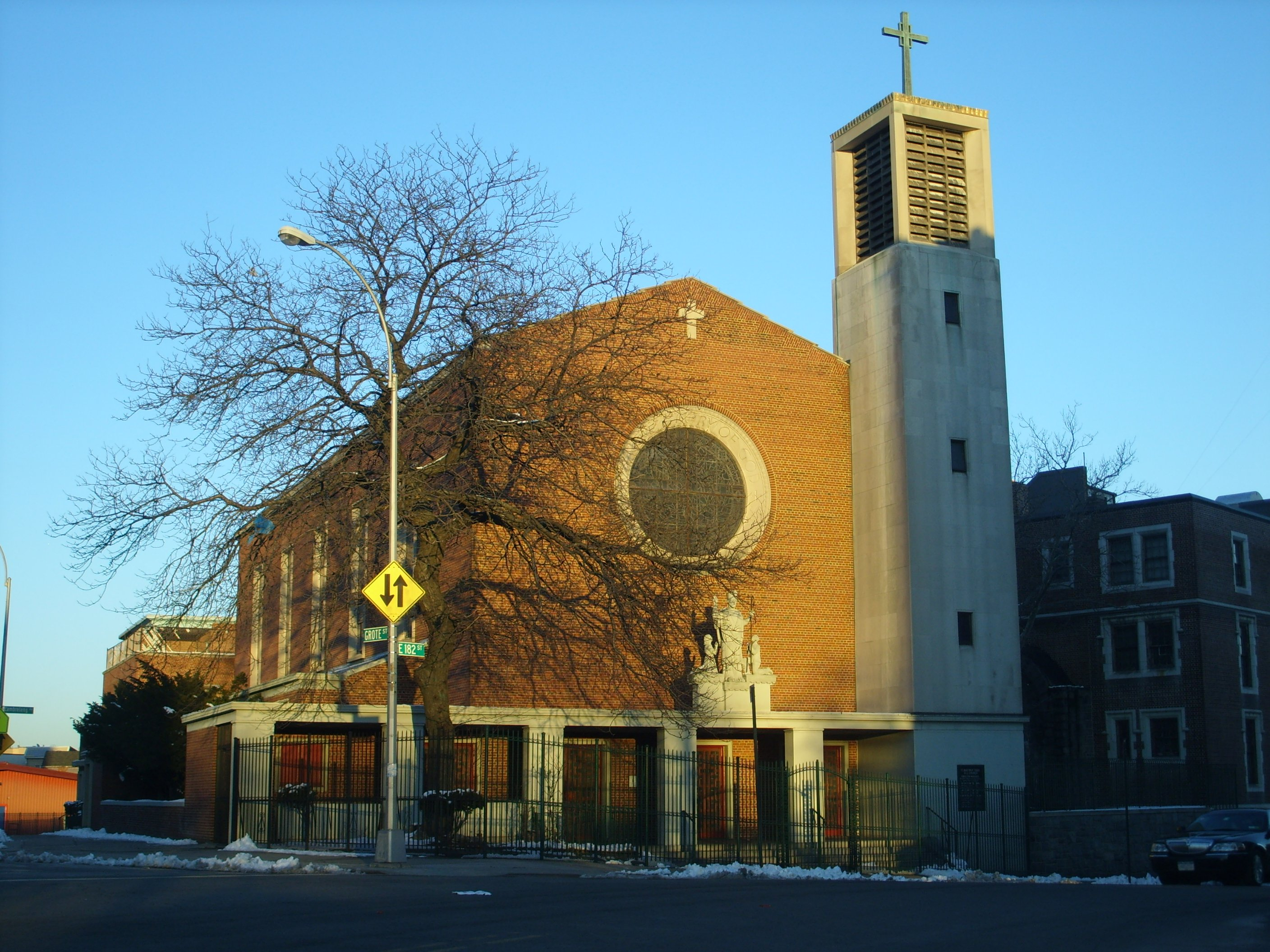
- St. Martin of Tours Church
- Interactive map of the The Church of St. Martin of Tours area

General information
- Architectural style: Modernist
- Location: Bronx, New York City, United States of America
- Client: Roman Catholic Archdiocese of New York

The Church of St. Martin of Tours is a Roman Catholic parish church under the authority of the Roman Catholic Archdiocese of New York, located at 664 Grote Street, South Belmont, Bronx, New York City.

== Parish history ==
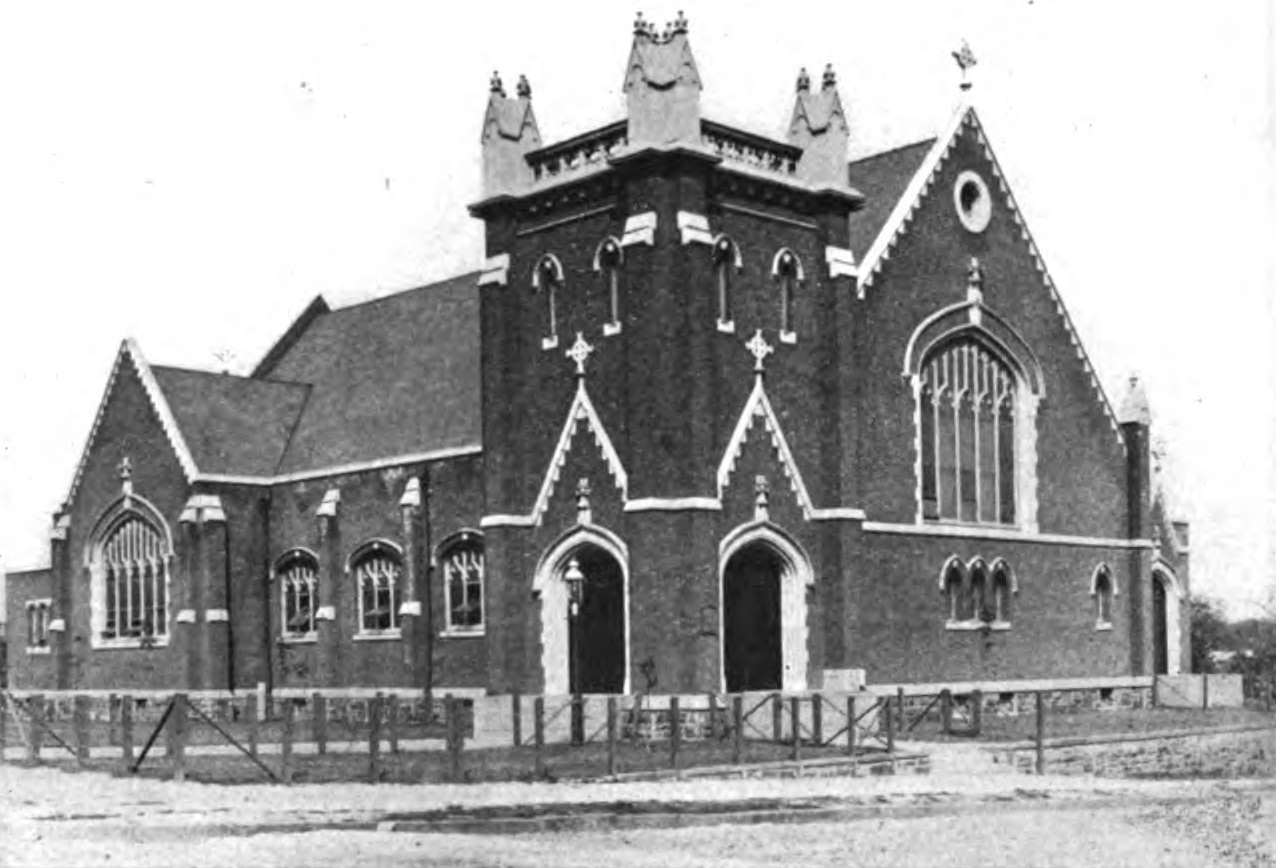
The old church as it appeared in 1914

The parish was established in 1897 at Belmont Avenue and 183rd Street by the Rev. Edward J. O'Gorman, who was assisted in 1914 by the Rev. David J. Leahy. Both attended the chapel at St. Martin's Academy. In 1914, "the parishioners number[ed] 800. The church property [was] valued at $150,000, with a debt of $21,000."

== Buildings ==
Before the present Modernist brick and concrete church was built, a large stone-towered Protestant-looking church was in use as photographed in 1914, which likely indicates the congregation had purchased and reused an existing church building before erecting the present structure.

== St. Martin of Tours' Parish School ==
The parochial school was established after 1914. The parish school was among 27 closed by Archbishop Dolan in the Archdiocese of New York on 11 January 2011.
