= Daughters of Divine Charity =

Roman Catholic religious congregation for women

Franziska Lechner

The Congregation of the Daughters of Divine Charity are an international congregation of Roman Catholic religious sisters. The motherhouse is in Vienna. The congregation uses the post-nominal “FDC”, from the Latin, Filiae Divinae Caritatis. The charism of the order is to "make God's love visible".

== History ==
Franziska Lechner was born in Bavaria, Germany. For a time she was a member of the School Sisters of Notre Dame and then, after leaving that congregation she worked with a priest in Switzerland where she founded a hospital and several schools.

Lechner traveled to Vienna and applied for permission to organize a women's congregation, which was founded on November 21, 1868. It was approved by the Holy See in 1884 and definitively confirmed on July 22, 1891. As the congregation grew, Lechner adopted the Rule of Saint Augustine for her sisters. She began her work by opening St. Mary's Homes for working girls during the European Industrial Revolution. The purpose of the congregation was to furnish girls without positions, shelter, care and the means of obtaining a position, and also to care for servants no longer able to work. The sisters were also engaged in schools, orphan asylums, and kindergartens. Within a short time, the sisters began opening schools in many areas of the Austro-Hungarian empire as well as retirement homes for the poor.

Lechner died in Austria in 1894. She has been named a "Servant of God".

As of 2017, there are over 1,000 members of the congregation, who profess the vows of chastity, poverty, and obedience. Their apostolic works now extend to the education of youth, providing care and home for the elderly, the mentally, physically and psychologically disabled.

== Countries where the order exists ==
The order has convents across Europe as well as in the US, Brasil, and Uganda. With approximately 1000 sisters worldwide.

Holy Family Province is based in Arrochar, Staten Island; Holy Trinity Province in Bloomfield Hills, Michigan. Members serve in the Archdioceses of New York and Detroit and the Dioceses of Cleveland, Fort Wayne/South Bend, and San Diego.

The sisters arrived in England in 1914, where their main apostolate had been education. They founded the Sacred Heart Convent school in Swaffham. In Chesterfield the sisters have a nursery and in Hunstanton run small care home. In the Parishes where their Convents are situated, many of the Sisters are Eucharistic ministers, visit the sick, elderly and housebound among other needs. In 2017 the sisters participated in a reality TV program, "Bad Habits, Holy Orders", in which five young women were invited to live at their convent and try to adapt to the different lifestyle, as part of this the sisters helped the girls to walk on a spiritual journey of self-discovery. The sisters created a pop-up soup kitchen to offer free meals in a trendy neighborhood of London on condition the customers turn off their phones and converse with fellow diners.

There is also a missionary community in Uganda.

=== Also ===
- Albania
- Africa
- Austria
- Bolivia
- Bosnia and Herzegovina
- Brazil
- Croatia
- Czech Republic
- Germany
- Hungary
- Italy
- Kosovo
- North Macedonia
- Poland
- Slovakia
- Ukraine

== See also ==
- Drina Martyrs

== Sources ==
- "Divine charity, Daughters of", New Catholic Encyclopedia, volume Com-Dyn, Catholic University of America, Thomson/Gale, 2003, p. 786.
