= Monsignor Scanlan High School =

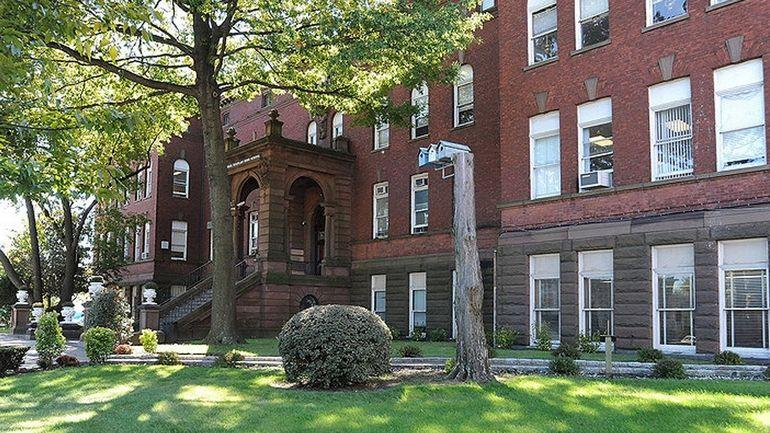
- Main Building

Location
- 915 Hutchinson River Parkway; Throggs Neck, Bronx, New York 10465; United States; 40°49′30.5″N 73°50′16″W

Information
- Type: Private, Coeducational
- Motto: "Remembering the Past, Preparing for the Future"
- Religious affiliation: Roman Catholic
- Established: 1949 (77 years ago)
- School code: 33975
- Principal: Eric Mercado
- Grades: 9–12
- Enrollment: 460 (2021)
- Campus size: 13 acres (53,000 m^{2})
- Colors: Navy and white
- Nickname: Crusaders
- Accreditation: Middle States Association of Colleges and Schools
- Newspaper: The Crusader
- School fees: $1,550
- Tuition: $8,050 (2025-2026)
- Affiliation: Dominican Sisters of Sparkill
- Athletic Director: Maxwell "Bingo" Cole
- Assistant Principal: Aimee Esposito
- Website: scanlanhs.edu

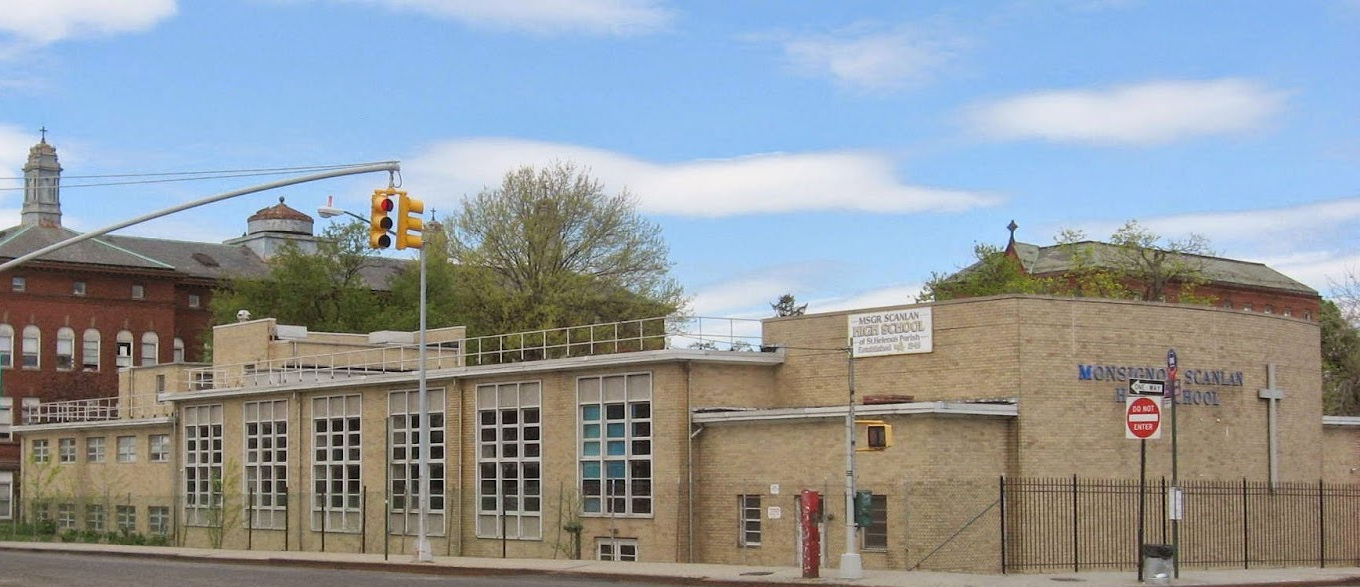

Monsignor Scanlan High School is high school in the Throggs Neck neighborhood of The Bronx, New York City, New York. It is under the jurisdiction of the Archdiocese of New York and is accredited by the Middle States Association of Colleges and Schools and the Board of Regents of the University of the State of New York.

== History ==
St. Helena's Elementary School was opened in 1940, concurrently with the construction of St. Helena's Church. The school building was originally adjacent to the church and had a capacity of 600 students.

The parish purchased land from St. Joseph's School for the Deaf in Throggs Neck in 1949, and that year opened two high schools, St. Helena's High School for Boys and St. Helena's High School for Girls. All three schools were formed by Monsignor Arthur J. Scanlan, founding pastor of St. Helena's Church. Both high schools were renamed in Scanlan's honor in 1972 and merged to form one coeducational high school in 1976. The parish also operated a business-oriented high school called St. Helena Commercial High School from 1956 to 2002.

The school was administratively separated from St. Helena Parish in 2014.

== Location ==
The school is located on a 13-acre campus in the Throggs Neck neighborhood of The Bronx. Students residing in The Bronx, Queens and Manhattan constitute the majority of the pupil population. The school is adjacent to Westchester Creek to the west and the Bronx–Whitestone Bridge and Ferry Point Park to the south.

== Athletics ==
The school offers athletic programs to its students. It has garnered several city-wide championship titles.

- Boys' Baseball (varsity) – 2015 & 2014 CHSAA City Champions
- Girls' Basketball junior varsity and varsity team – 2019, 2017 and 2016 A Division New York City Archdiocesan Champions; three recent graduates were recruited to Division 1 women's basketball programs at Virginia Commonwealth University, Towson University and Providence College; former WNBA Los Angeles Sparks player Monique Coker also hails from Scanlan
- Girls' Softball
- Boys' Basketball – Junior Varsity 2019 Archdiocesan Champions
- Girls' Volleyball
- Track
- Cross country
- Intramural sports

== Notable alumni ==
- Koby Brea - NBA player
- Jim Dietz – Olympic silver medalist; National Rowing Hall of Fame
- Patrick Lynch – president, Patrolmen's Benevolent Association
- Sister Jean M. Marshall, recipient of the Eleanor Roosevelt Human Rights Award from President Bill Clinton in 1999.
- Mike Nagy – former MLB player for the Boston Red Sox, St. Louis Cardinals, Texas Rangers, and Houston Astros
- George A. Romero – filmmaker, notably for creating the Night of the Living Dead film series
- Louie Vega – international DJ; 2018 Grammy Award winner (six-time nominee); producer; artist
