= Woman of Courage Award =

Award conferred by NOW to women

Since 1994, the National Organization for Women (NOW) has presented the Woman of Courage Award annually (in most years) at the National NOW Conference, and periodically at issue-based summits organized by NOW and/or the NOW Foundation. Honorees are chosen for having demonstrated personal bravery in challenging entrenched power and in carrying out action that has the potential to benefit women in general.

Recipients of this award have been plaintiffs in lawsuits that challenged sex-based discrimination and pervasive sexual harassment. They have also been leaders who organized other women to promote better working conditions and opportunities in non-traditional careers, such as New York firefighter Capt. Brenda Berkman. An awardee may be an individual who brought attention to an important issue through her own experience, such as Christy Brzonkala. After being raped by two football players at Virginia Tech, Brzonkala sued the university, and her case went all the way to the U.S. Supreme Court.

Another honoree was a young woman, Julia Gabriel, who took action to improve labor conditions by testifying against those who force illegal servitude. In a highly publicized case, future awardee Lilly Ledbetter took her case against sex-based pay discrimination by Goodyear Tire and Rubber to the Supreme Court at great personal cost. NOW also presents the Woman of Courage Award to women who have accomplished special or unique feats undertaken by few others, such as Barbara Hillary, who reached the North Pole at the age of 75.

Year	Winner	Occupation
2014	Ruslana Lyzhichko	Singer, social activist
2011	Nancy Hogshead-Makar	Title IX advocate, Olympic athlete (1984)
2009	Susan Hill	Abortion rights activist
2008	Barbara Hillary	Nurse, Traveler
2008	Lilly Ledbetter	Activist against wage discrimination
2006	Dr. Susan Wood	Former Assistant Commissioner for Women's Health and Director of the Food and Drug Administration's (FDA) Office of Women's Health
2006	Ani DiFranco	Singer, songwriter, vocalist, guitarist, activist
2005	Tillie Black Bear	Founder of the first shelter for women of color
2005	Sybil Niden Goldrich	Advocate for women on silicone breast implants
2005	Kakenya Ntaiya	Educating African women
2005	Katie Hnida	Footballer
2004	Dr. Donna J. Nelson	Professor of organic chemistry, University of Oklahoma; Nelson Diversity Surveys author
2004	Carol Moseley Braun	United States Senator (1992–98) and U.S. Ambassador (1999–2001)
2003	Barbara Lee	U.S. Representative (D-Calif.)
2002	Captain Brenda Berkman	Firefighter
2002	JoDee Flockhart	Advocate against sexual harassment in workplace
2001	Cheryl Haworth	Olympic weightlifter
2001	Maryanne Connelly	Feminist politician, former mayor of Fanwood, NJ
2000	Christy Brzonkala	First person in U.S. to sue her attackers under the Violence Against Women Act
2000	Elaine Gordon	Trail-blazing legislator
2000	Julia Gabriel	Activist against forced labor
1999	Martina Pickett	Advocate for safe and just workplace
1999	Tapestry of Polygamy	Group of women against the abuse of women and girls in illegal polygamous marriages
1999	Del Martin	Lesbian rights activist (married to Phyllis Lyon)
1999	Phyllis Lyon	Lesbian rights activist (married to Del Martin)
1998	Sylvia Smith and the Tonawanda NOW chapter	Native American rights activist
1997	Smith Barney Suit	Class-action sexual harassment and discrimination suit against Morgan Stanley Smith Barney, LLC.
1997	Judge Lanier Suit	Supreme Court sexual assault case against Chancery Court Judge David Lanier in United States v. Lanier
1997	Mitsubishi Suit	Lawsuit against Mitsubishi plant in Normal, Ill., for discrimination, verbal and physical abuse
1996	Mimi Ramsey	Founder of FORWARD International, a group that opposes female genital mutilation
1996	Claudia Crown Ades	Reproductive rights activist
1996	Rachel Bauchman	Young feminist
1995	Shannon Faulkner	First female member of the Corps of Cadets
1995	Merari Ortiz	Then 10-year-old welfare rights activist
1994	Lisa Tiger	Native American AIDS activist
1994	Dolores Huerta	Co-founder of the United Farm Workers (UFW)
1994	Fay Clayton	Chicago attorney who successfully argued NOW v. Scheidler
1994	Dr. Susan Wicklund	Reproductive Justice advocate

== See also ==
- List of awards honoring women
