= St. Joseph's School for the Deaf =

School in New York City

Coordinates: 40°49′37″N 73°50′8″W

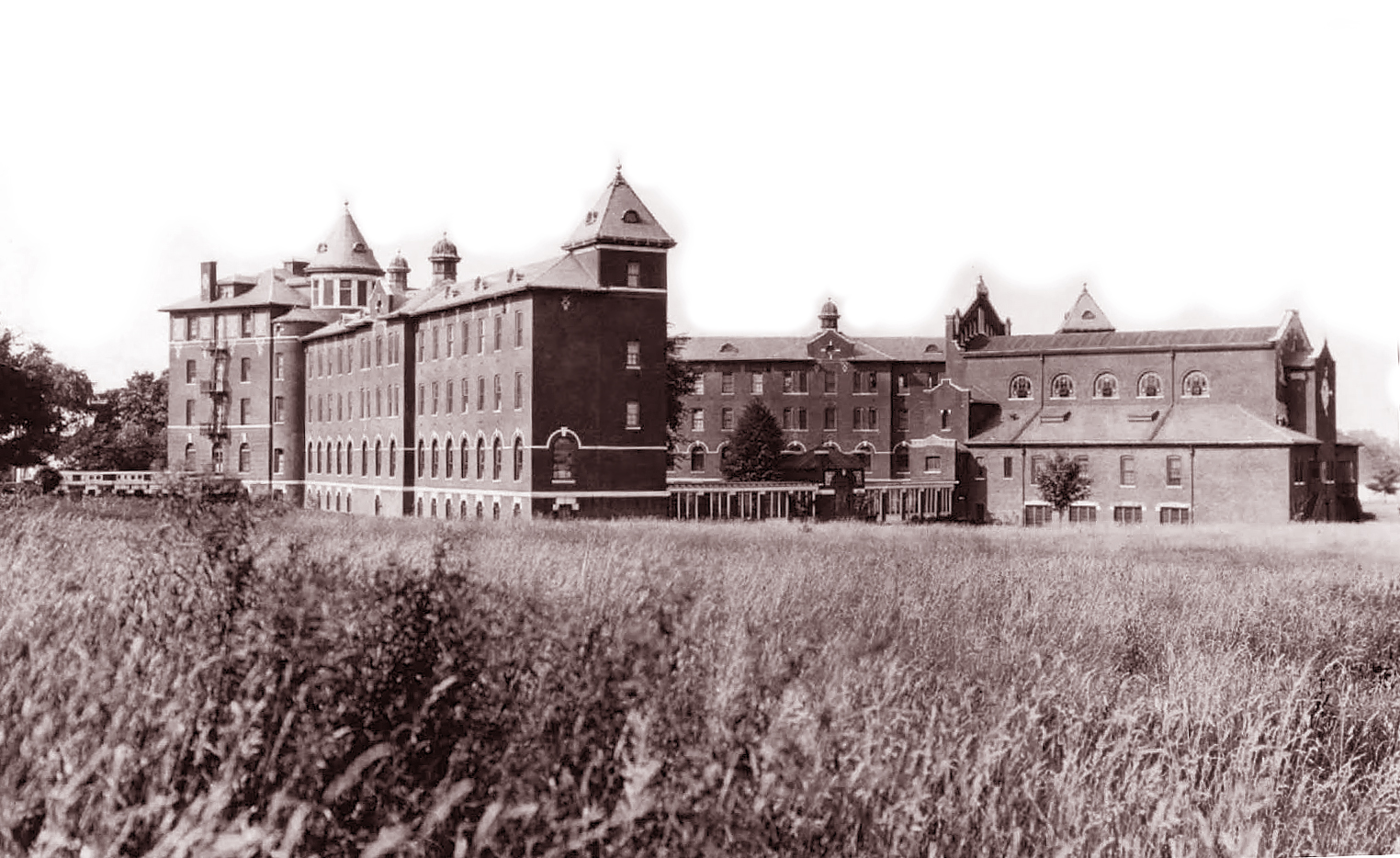
The 1913 building photographed in 1928

St. Joseph's School for the Deaf is a Catholic school for deaf students in Throggs Neck, in the Bronx borough of New York City, United States. The school has operated since 1869; it opened its current campus in 1876 and its current brick Romanesque Revival building in 1913.

In 1939, the Hutchinson River Parkway extension cut the two halves of the campus off from each other, and the western part of the campus and its buildings were in 1949 transferred to become Monsignor Scanlan High School. St. Joseph's continued to operate in the remaining part.

== Description ==
The school serves students from infancy through eighth grade. In 2008 fiscal year, St. Joseph's had about 112 students and 98 staff. In addition to the main school, it also operated a daycare center and pre-school. As of 2010, St. Joseph's was one of eleven private schools in New York receiving state aid to provide educational services for disabled students, under Section 4201 of the State Education Law. The school is currently located on a 10-acre plot.

== History ==
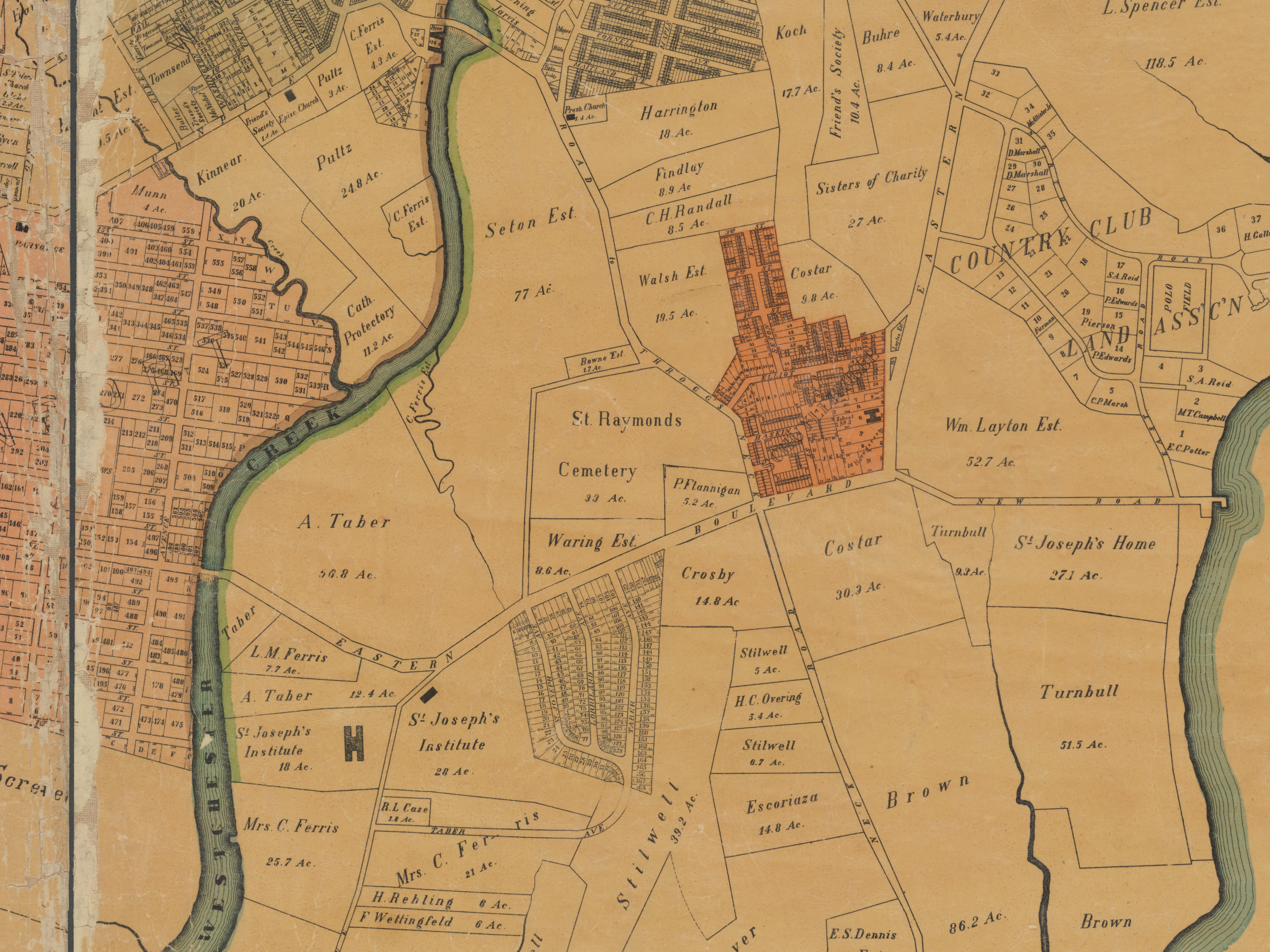
1891 map of the vicinity of St. Joseph's School (bottom left). The road dividing the campus would be replaced with an extension of the Hutchinson River Parkway in 1939.

St. Joseph's was founded in 1869 by Victorine Boucher and the Society of the Daughters of the Heart of Mary. Its first location was in Fordham at 772 East 188th Street. In its early years it was known as Saint Joseph's Institute for the Improved Instruction of Deaf Mutes. In 1874 a branch location was added on Buffalo Avenue and Bergen Street in Bedford–Stuyvesant, Brooklyn.

The present site in Throggs Neck was established in 1876 on a tract purchased from Charles Lochran. The site contained an 18th-century house built by the Ferris family known as Oakland Cottage, which was reused as the school's convent. Two new buildings were constructed on the west side of the campus by Schickel & Ditmars, the second in 1897. The current building was constructed in the east part of the campus in 1913. It is a massive brick Romanesque Revival building also designed and constructed by Schickel & Ditmars.

The Brooklyn location closed in 1936. In 1939, the conversion of Ferry Point Road into the Hutchinson River Parkway extension cut off the two halves of the campus from each other. A tram tunnel under the parkway was used to connect the two campus halves. However, the impracticality of the division led to the west campus to be transferred in 1949 to St. Helena's Church to become Monsignor Scanlan High School. The St. Joseph's residential program ended in 1950.
