= St. Thomas Aquinas College =

Private college in Sparkill, New York, US

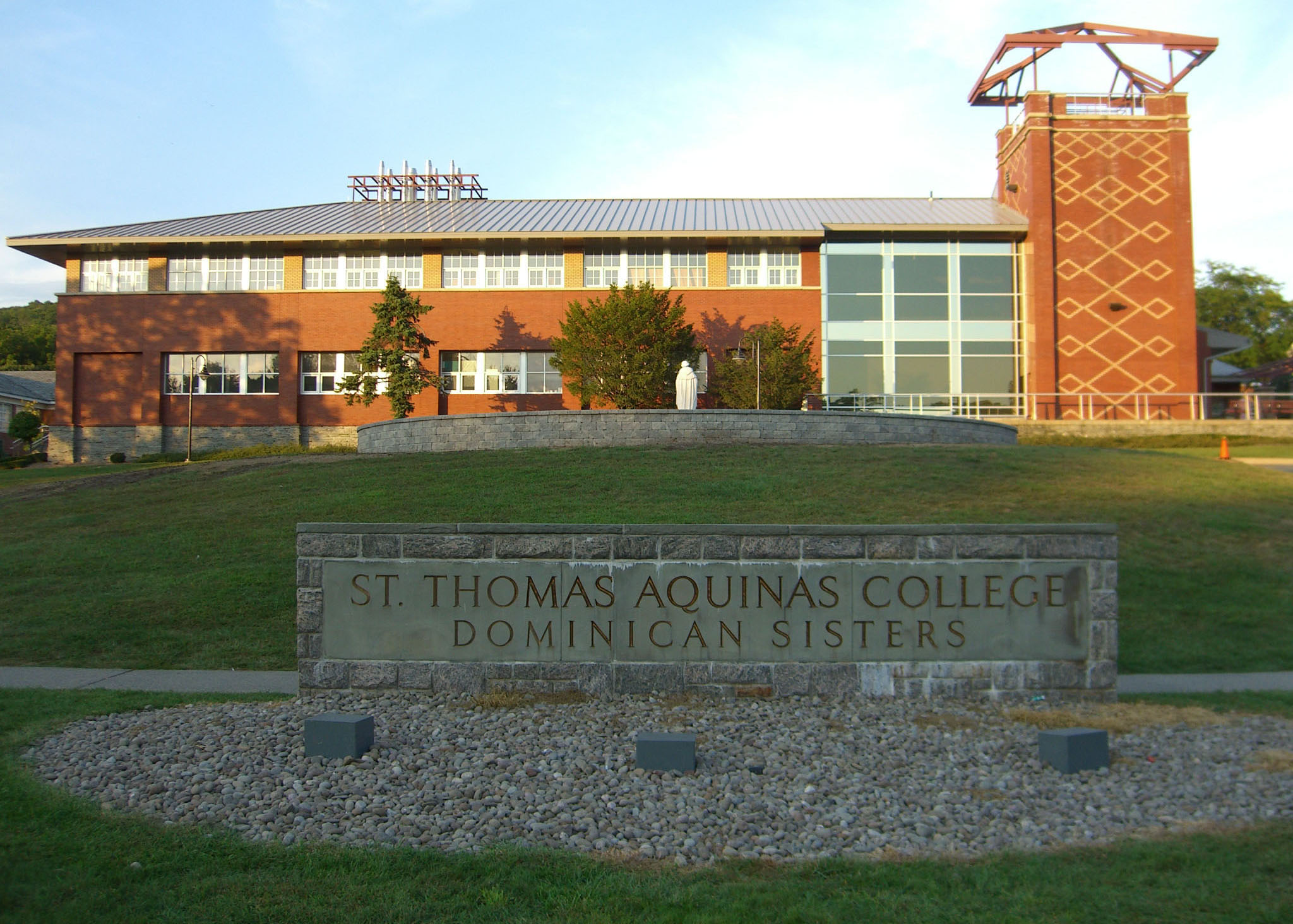
- The campus of the college, showing Costello Hall in the background
- Motto: To enlighten the mind through truth
- Type: Private college
- Established: 1952; 74 years ago
- President: Ken Daly
- Provost: Robert Murray
- Academic staff: 52 FT/ 82 PT (2023)
- Students: 1,950 (2023)
- Undergraduates: 1,795 (2023)
- Postgraduates: 155 (2023)
- Location: Sparkill, New York, U.S. 41°02′32″N 73°56′09″W
- Campus: Suburban
- Colors: Maroon & gold
- Sporting affiliations: NCAA Division II East Coast Conference
- Mascot: Spartans
- Website: stac.edu
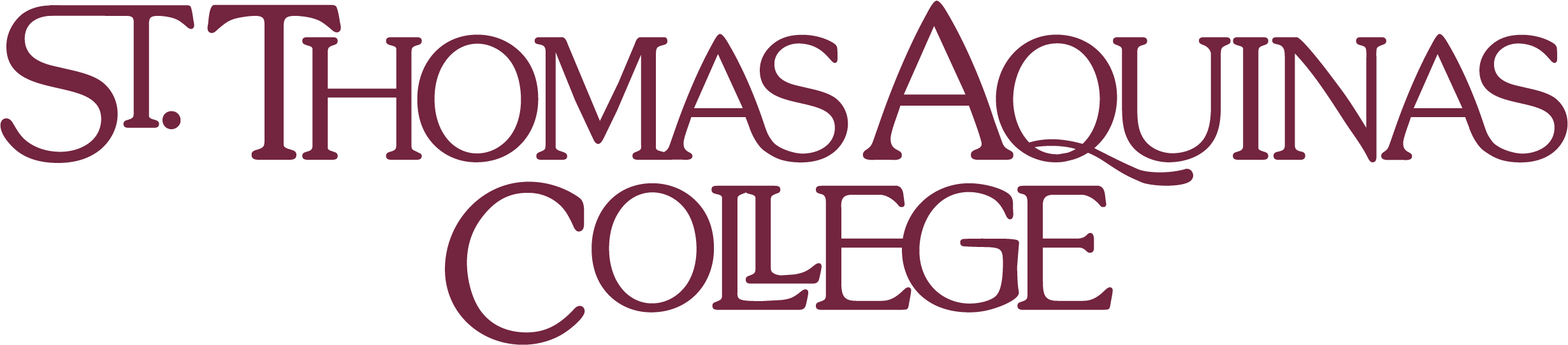

St. Thomas Aquinas College (STAC) is a private college in Sparkill, New York, United States. The college is named after the medieval philosopher and theologian Thomas Aquinas. It was founded by the Dominican Sisters of Sparkill, whose headquarters are in the town. The college offers 35 majors across three schools: Arts and Sciences, Business, and Education.

== Facilities ==
Romano Center

- Also known as the Romano Student-Alumni Center, or RSAC for short. This building houses the Spartan Grille, a fast food counter restaurant along with dining seating areas located throughout the hall. Romano Center also houses the campus' bookstore, a small stage, a small video game area, a pool table area, and other campus service offices.

Maguire Hall

- Primarily consists of offices and classrooms. This section of the campus also houses Sullivan Theater, a small performing arts theater. It also features some art studios and a seminar room, known as the Smith Seminar room.

Naughton Hall / Marian Gardens

- Naugton Hall consists of professors offices. Marian Gardens consists of a walking path and a small rest area.

Aquinas Hall

- This hall is located at the center of the campus. It consists of Campus Safety & Security, the Mail Room, the Aquinas Hall Gymnasium, The Kraus Fitness Center, and Athletics Offices.

Costello Hall

- Consists of offices and classrooms related to the division of science education. It has science labs and lecture-like classrooms. The hall also houses the Azarian-McCullough Art Gallery and the Poggi Family Terrace.

Spellman Hall

- Consists of classrooms, computer labs, and many academic and administrative offices. This hall also consists of the Lougheed Library and the Center for Academic Excellence, a tutoring center for all STAC students. There is also a television/media studio.

Borelli Hall

- Consists of offices and classrooms related to the majors of business and education. It is also the hall where the Office of the President is housed.

Aquinas Village

- Consists of residence dorms for upperclassmen and tennis courts where the men's and women's tennis teams play.

McNelis Commons

- Consists of residence dorms for lowerclassmen and a buffet-styled cafeteria.

== Athletics ==
The St. Thomas Aquinas athletic teams are called the Spartans. The college is a member of the Division II ranks of the National Collegiate Athletic Association (NCAA), primarily competing in the East Coast Conference (ECC) for most of its sports since the 2000–01 academic year; while its sprint football team competes in the Collegiate Sprint Football League (CSFL). The Spartans previously competed in the Central Atlantic Collegiate Conference (CACC) from 1965–66 to 1998–99.

St. Thomas Aquinas competes in 22 intercollegiate varsity teams: Men's sports include baseball, basketball, cross country, golf, ice hockey, lacrosse, soccer, sprint football, tennis, track & field and volleyball; while women's sports include basketball, bowling, cross country, field hockey, lacrosse, soccer, softball, tennis, track & field, triathlon and volleyball.

Men's and women's volleyball were added into its athletics program in the 2023–24 school year.

Club sports are also available at the college, including cheer and dance team and volleyball. The Spartans have a cross-campus rivalry with the Dominican University New York Chargers since they are geographically a mile away from each other. Their mascot is The Spartan.

== Notable alumni ==
- Gordon Chiesa, assistant coach for the Memphis Grizzlies of the NBA
- Barbara Corcoran, self-made real estate millionaire who sold her company The Corcoran Group for $70 million in 2001.
- Gordon M. Johnson, Representative of the 37th legislative district in the New Jersey General Assembly.
- John Jurasek, aka TheReportOfTheWeek and Reviewbrah, YouTube fast-food reviewer
- Sister Jean M. Marshall, who received the Eleanor Roosevelt Human Rights Award from President Bill Clinton in 1999.
- Frank Messina, poet and author.
- Craig Zucker, Maryland State Senator for the 14th Legislative District, Montgomery County
