= Donna Nelson =

Native American chemist (born 1954)

Donna J. Nelson
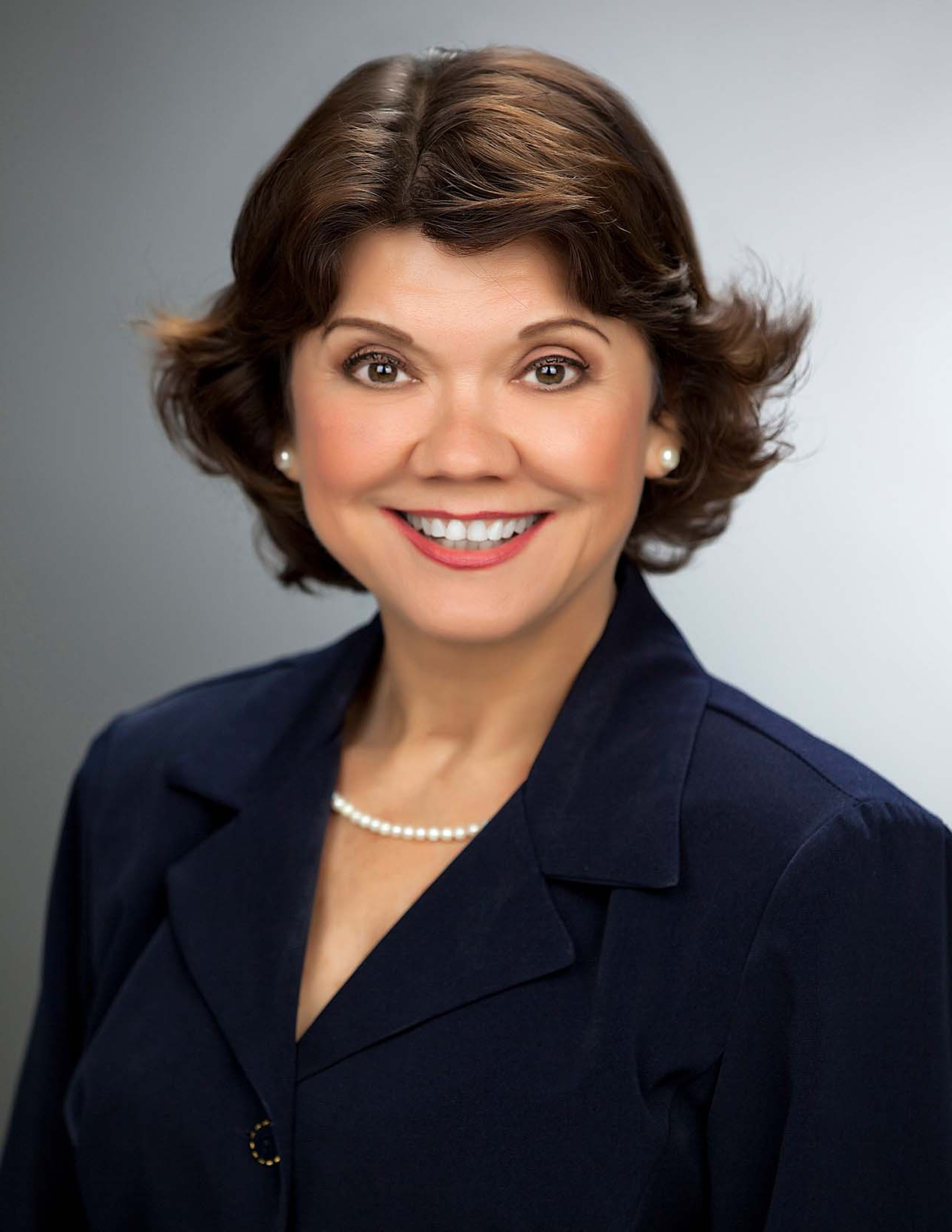
- Born: 1954 (age 71–72); Eufaula, Oklahoma, U.S.
- Education: University of Oklahoma (BA); University of Texas at Austin (PhD)
- Known for: 2016 American Chemical Society President; Diversity in STEM work; Science advisor for Breaking Bad; Physical organic chemistry research; Applying NMR to SWCNT characterization; Mechanistic patterns in alkene addition reactions; Evaluating organic chemistry textbook accuracy
- Awards: ACS Fellow (2010); Fulbright Scholar (2007); AAAS Fellow (2005); NOW Woman of Courage Award (2004); Guggenheim Fellowship (2003); Ford Fellow (2003); NSF Special Creativity Extension (1989)
- Scientific career
- Fields: Chemistry
- Workplaces: University of Oklahoma
- Doctoral advisor: Michael J. S. Dewar
- Other academic advisors: Herbert C. Brown
- Website: djnelson75.wixsite.com/mysite

Donna J. Nelson (born 1954) is an American chemist and professor of chemistry at the University of Oklahoma. Nelson specializes in organic chemistry, which she both researches and teaches. Nelson served as the science advisor to the AMC television show Breaking Bad. She was the 2016 President of the American Chemical Society (ACS) with her presidential activities focusing on and guided by communities in chemistry. Nelson's research focused on six primary topics, generally categorized in two areas, Scientific Research and America's Scientific Readiness. Within Scientific Research, Nelson's topics have been on collecting, compiling, and disseminating CDC statistics revealing fentanyl death numbers and rates, on mechanistic patterns in alkene addition reactions, and on single-walled carbon nanotube (SWCNT) functionalization and analysis, yielding the first COSY NMR spectrum of covalently functionalized SWCNTs in solution. Under America's Scientific Readiness, she focuses on science education and impacting science by considering its communities; this includes classroom innovations and correcting organic chemistry textbook inaccuracies, on ethnic and gender diversity (the Nelson Diversity Surveys) among highly ranked science departments of research universities, and on improving the image and presentation of science and scientists to the public.

== Education and career ==
Nelson was born in Eufaula, Oklahoma, a small town known as the center of the Muscogee Creek Nation. Her father was the only physician in the town. She earned her Bachelor of Science degree in chemistry at the University of Oklahoma. She obtained her PhD in chemistry at the University of Texas at Austin with Michael J. S. Dewar and did post-doctorate work at Purdue University with 1979 Chemistry Nobel Laureate Herbert C. Brown. Nelson joined the University of Oklahoma as a faculty member.

Nelson was a faculty fellow in the University of Oklahoma Provost's Office from 1989 to 1990. She was the first woman faculty fellow and the first assistant professor to enter the position, being promoted during the year. Anita Hill followed her, as the second female faculty fellow in the Provost's Office. Nelson was a visiting professor at the Massachusetts Institute of Technology in 2003 with Nancy Hopkins and in 2010 with Michael Strano.

In 2016, she served as president of the American Chemical Society.

== Awards and honors ==
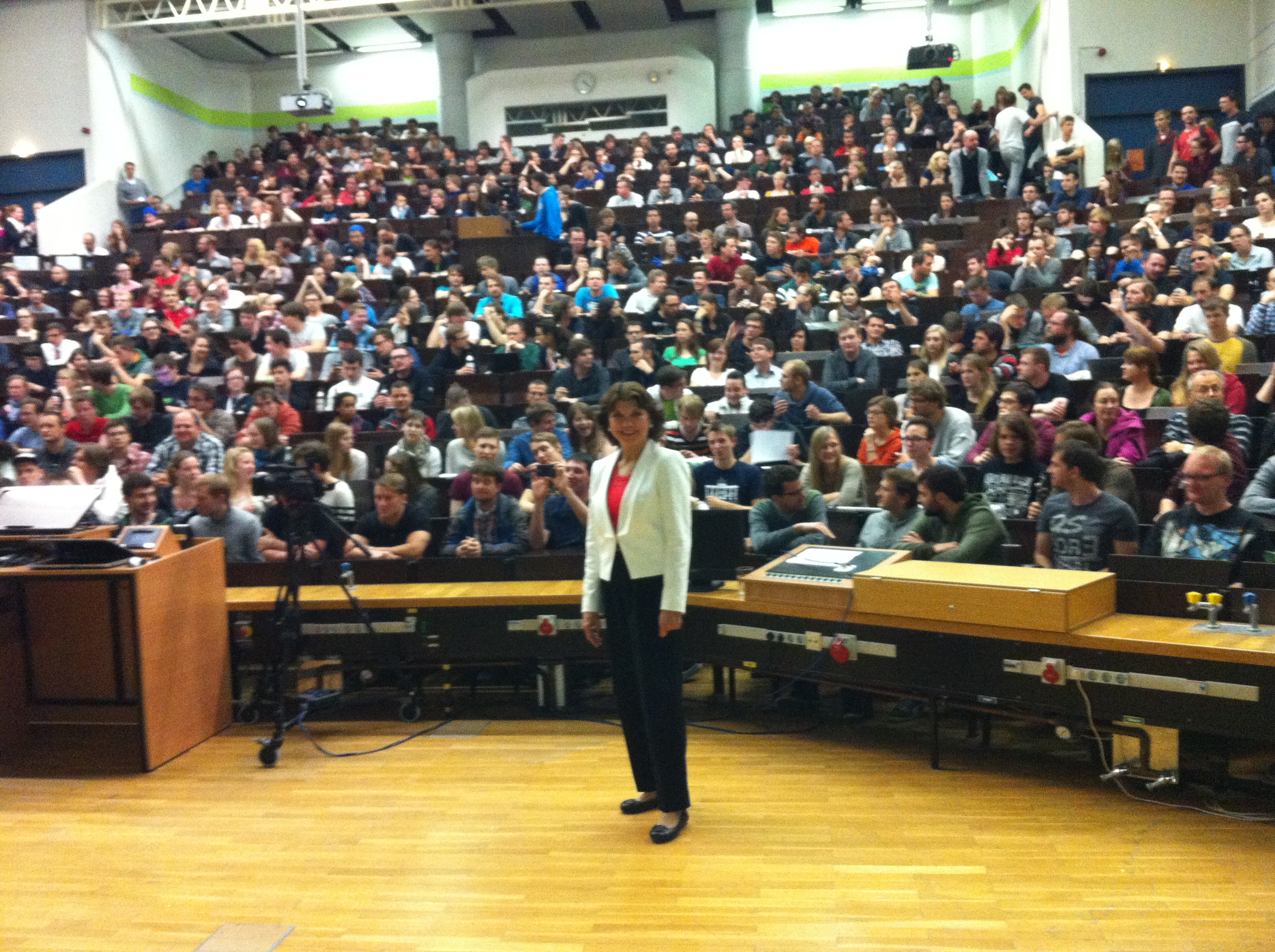
Nelson speaking in Bayreuth, Germany, on 16 May 2014 about her activities as science advisor to the television show Breaking Bad

Nelson has received a number of honors and awards. These include American Chemical Society (ACS) President (2016), Fellow of the Royal Society of Chemistry (FRSC, 2019), an honorary doctorate from the University of Edinburgh (2021), Israel Chemical Society Fellow (2016), ACS Fellow (2010), ACS Henry Hill Award (for professionalism) (2013), Guggenheim Fellowship (2003), NSF Special Creativity Extension (1989), American Association for the Advancement of Science AAAS Fellow (2005), Sigma Xi Fellow (2020), Alpha Chi Sigma Hall of Fame (2022), National Organization for Women “Woman of Courage” Award (2004), Ford Foundation Fellowship (2003), Fulbright Scholarship (2007), and National Science Foundation (NSF) ADVANCE Leadership Award (2006). She was named one of the "70 Most Inspirational Women Leaders Impacting the World" by Business.org in 2018 and among "These 12 Texas Women Made History" by UT Austin in 2021. She has also received the ACS Nalley Award (2011), ACS Stan Israel Award (2011), SACNAS Distinguished Scientist Award (2006), Oklahoma Higher Education Hall of Fame, (2013) ACS Oklahoma Chemist of the Year (2012), Oklahoma Outstanding Professor Award (2005), Women's eNews 21 Leaders for the 21st Century (2006), Minority Health Professions Foundation Hall of Fame Inductee (2005), and Sigma Xi Faculty Research Award (2001). In October 2017, FLOGEN Star Outreach awarded her with the Fray International Sustainability Award at SIPS 2017 (Sustainable Industrial Processing Summit), in Cancun, Mexico.

Nelson has written over 200 research-related publications, and has given hundreds of invited presentations to national meetings of professional societies and organizations, universities, and radio and TV programs, such as NPR, New York Times, Wall Street Journal, The NewsHour with Jim Lehrer and Marketplace Morning Report. The Journal of Organic Chemistry cover of February 4, 2005, and the ACS's Division of Organic Chemistry Calendar cover of September, 2006, each featured her research. The Chemical Heritage Foundation (2009), Society for the Advancement of Chicanos and Native Americans in Science (2004), and JustGarciaHill (2003) each collected her history to add to their collections of prominent scientist biographies. Nelson was made a member of the Daughters of the American Revolution in 2020, as a descendant of Thomas "Scotch Tom" Nelson and of Thomas Nelson Jr., a signer of the Declaration of Independence.

== Scientific research ==
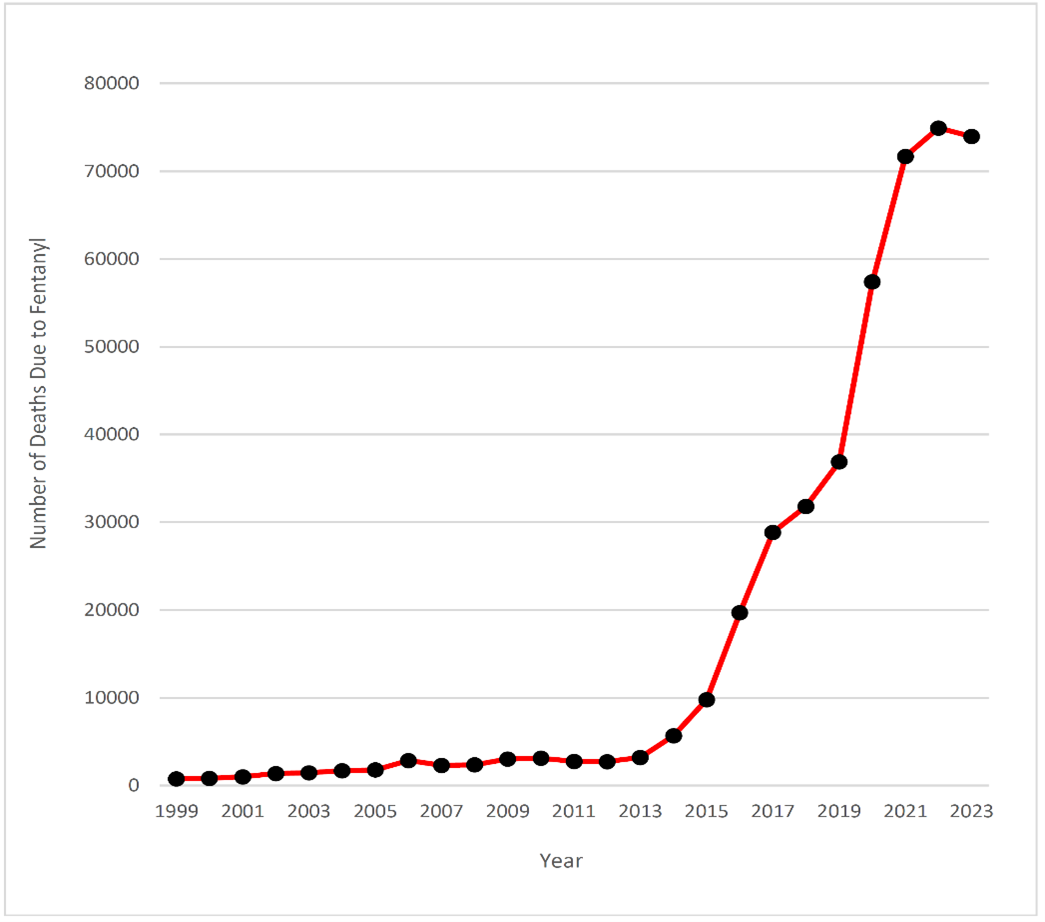
CDC data indicate there were 75,000 deaths due to fentanyl in the US in 2022. The 2023 data are provisional and are increasing.

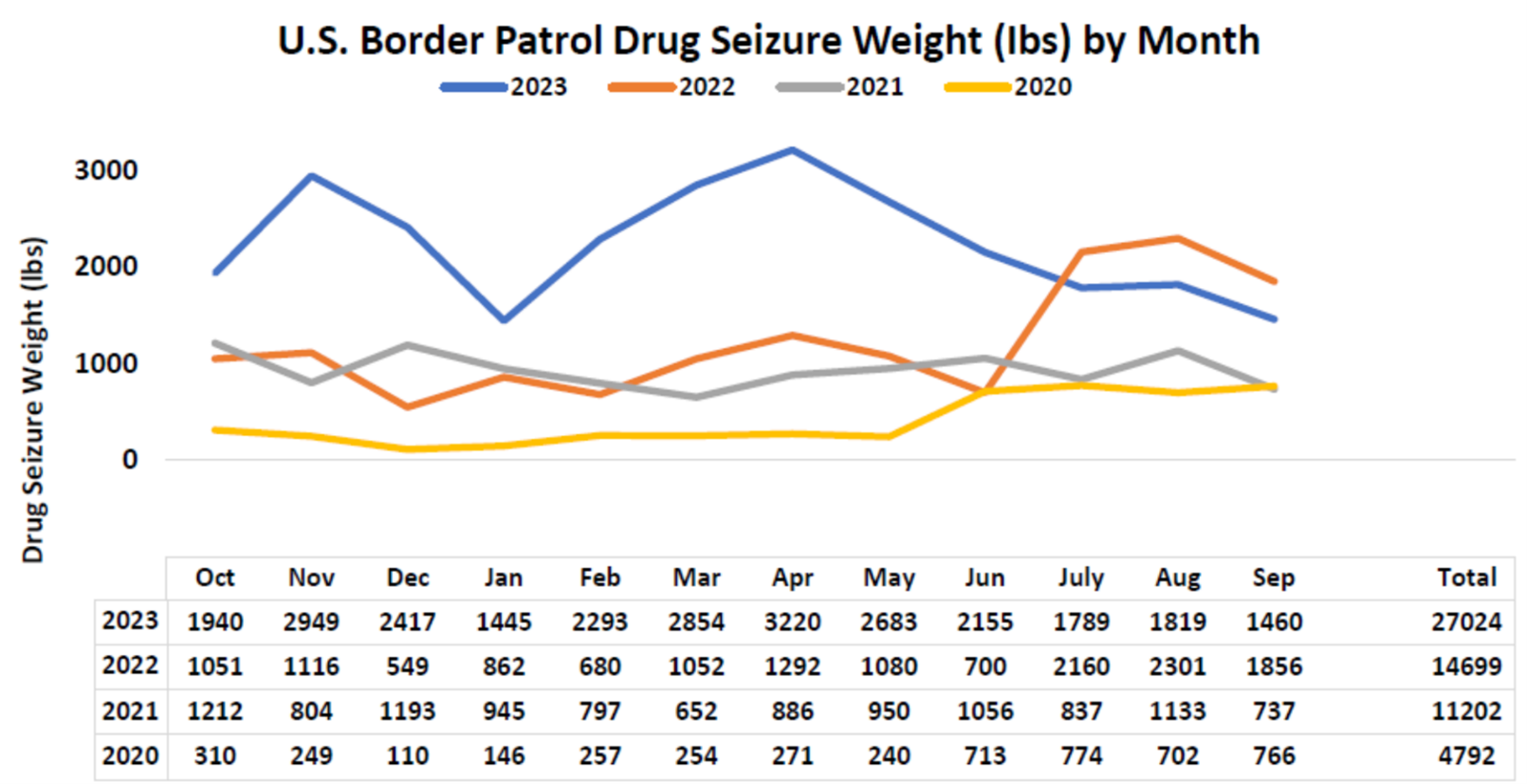
US Border Patrol seized 27024 pounds of fentanyl in 2023. A lethal dose is 2mg. So, 27024 pounds is sufficient to kill the entire US population 18 times.

=== Addressing Fentanyl Poisonings ===
Dr. Nelson collected, compiled, and disseminated CDC statistics showing that fentanyl deaths increased from 3,000 in 2013 to 75,000 in 2023. The dramatic increase in those 10 years convinced people that fentanyl is a serious problem in the US. She disaggregated annual death rates by race, gender and age, in order to determine which communities are being impacted most greatly. The highest death rates due to fentanyl are for Black males and Native American males, and these are still increasing, while other races are declining slightly. Fentanyl has become the major cause of death for Americans aged 18 through 45. For fiscal year 2023, US Border Patrol fentanyl seizures increased to 27024 lbs, which is 18 times the amount needed to kill every person in the US. She was alone in studying and reporting the statistics in these graphs. She also built a community doing bench chemistry on fentanyl, by organizing symposia on fentanyl at the 2023 Fall and 2025 Spring ACS Meetings and 2023 SWRM ACS Meeting. In her University of Oklahoma classes where she told students to carry Naloxone, her students thanked her, saying that they had lost friends or family members to fentanyl and that she was the only person at OU warning them about fentanyl.

=== Single-walled carbon nanotube (SWCNT) reactions ===
In 2005, Nelson began applying to single-walled carbon nanotube (SWCNT) reactions the knowledge gained from her earlier research on the effects of substituents upon reactions of alkenes. She applied nuclear magnetic resonance spectroscopy (NMR) to examine the effects of substituents upon SWCNT reaction and association with a variety of classes of organic molecules, such as alcohols, amines, ketones, aldehydes and nitro compounds. By doing this, she pioneered the application of NMR to functionalized and pristine SWCNT characterization and analysis.

=== Reactions of alkenes ===
As a physical organic chemist, Nelson developed a new synthetically useful technique for gathering mechanistic information on addition reactions of alkenes. The investigations often permitted selection of one mechanism from several which are proposed. The technique has helped determine mechanisms of important addition reactions of alkenes, such as hydroboration, oxymercuration, bromination, the Wacker process, and the Wilkinson's catalyst reaction.

== America's scientific readiness ==
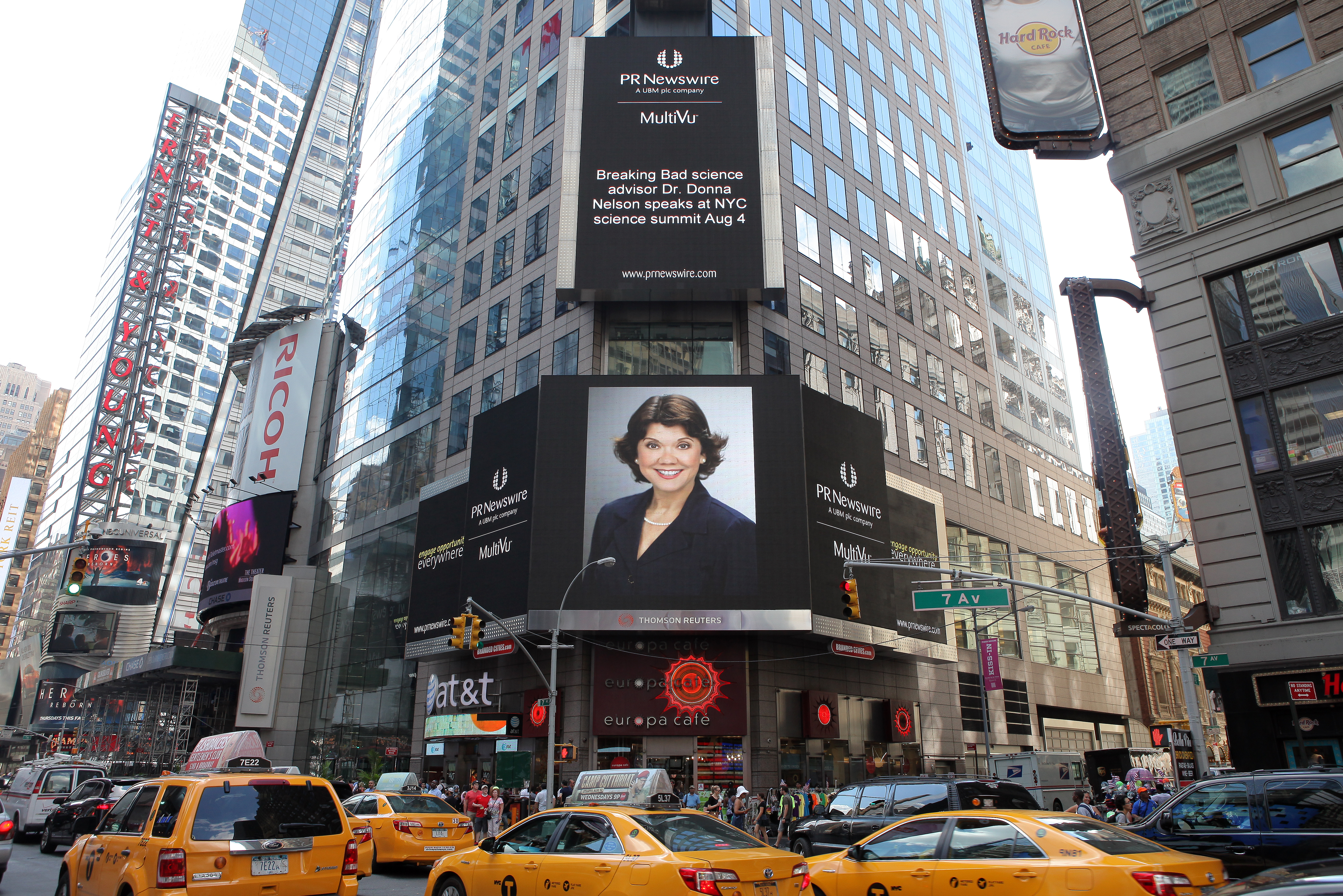
Dr. Donna J Nelson Times Square photo related to her speaking in NYC on August 4, 2015

=== Science education ===
==== Improving organic chemistry textbooks ====
In 2011, Nelson examined comprehensive undergraduate organic chemistry textbooks in use at that time, in order to determine consistency in cyclohexane conformation across the texts and with research literature; they recommended changes to remedy inconsistencies in cyclohexane conformer nomenclature and structural drawings across the textbooks. She and her students continue to evaluate currently used undergraduate organic chemistry textbooks in order to identify other content at odds with research literature and characteristics which are most conducive to learning.

==== Classroom innovations ====
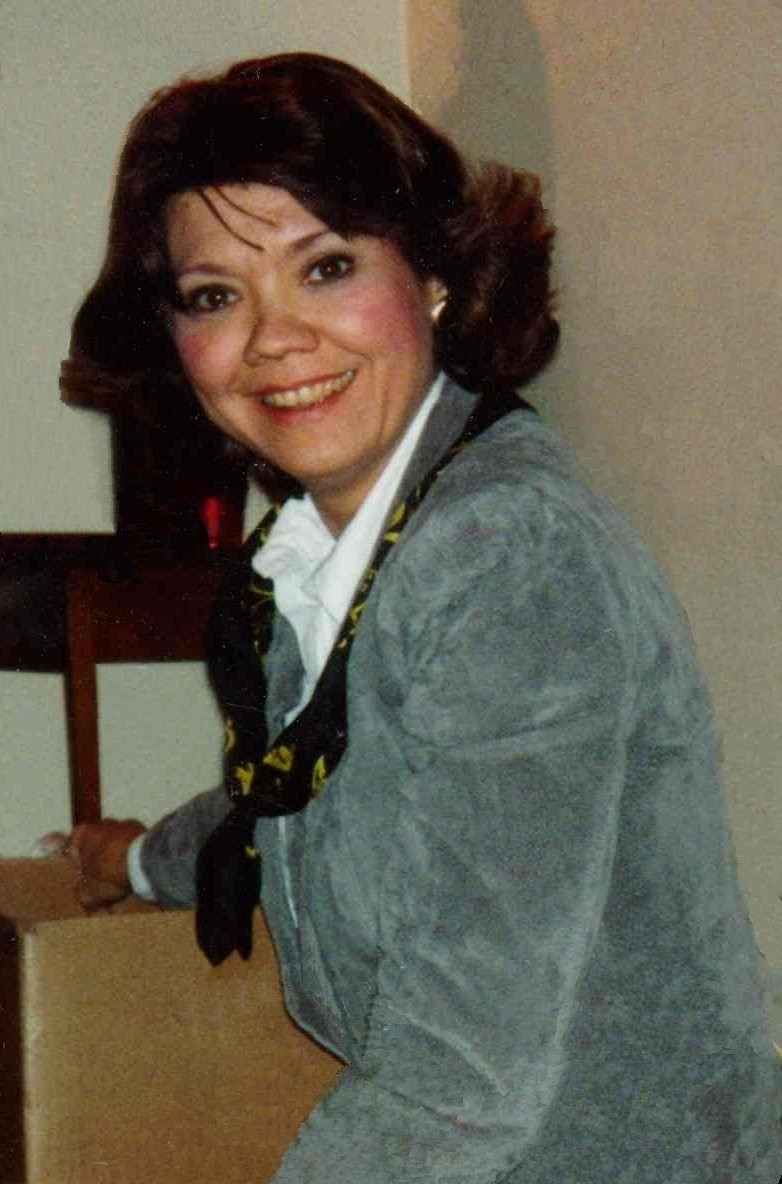
Donna Nelson

Nelson utilized her teaching assignment of large sections of organic chemistry to develop and evaluate learning devices for her students. The devices use a visual, rather than oral or written, presentation; two were adopted by publishers to accompany their major organic chemistry textbooks. She also surveyed students in order to determine factors which influence students to select or remain in science majors. Nelson's research results and materials from an education project, designed by Oklahoma high school students and involving precipitate-forming reactions conducted in microgravity on board the STS-40, are the subject of a permanent educational exhibit demonstrating the scientific method, at the Oklahoma Air and Space Museum.

=== Research on diversity in science ===
From FY2001 to FY2004, Nelson surveyed tenured and tenure-track university faculty members of the "top 50" departments in each of 14 science and engineering disciplines (chemistry, physics, mathematics, chemical engineering, civil engineering, electrical engineering, mechanical engineering, computer science, political science, sociology, economics, biological sciences, and psychology). Data were collected about race/ethnicity, gender, and rank, and are complete populations, rather than samples, so they accurately reveal the small number or complete absence of underrepresented groups. Data for all disciplines were obtained simultaneously and by a consistent protocol and are therefore comparable across a large number of disciplines. The National Science Foundation named these the Nelson Diversity Surveys.

That first study revealed that generally, women and minorities are significantly underrepresented on these faculties. For example, the first survey, completed in FY2002, showed that there were no black, Hispanic, or Native American tenured or tenure track women faculty in the top 50 computer science departments. For chemistry and chemical engineering faculties, her additional national origin data revealed that, recently, more immigrants have been hired as faculty than American females and American minorities combined. Analogous surveys were carried out for top 100 departments in each of 15 science and engineering disciplines, including earth science, in FY2005 and in FY2007.

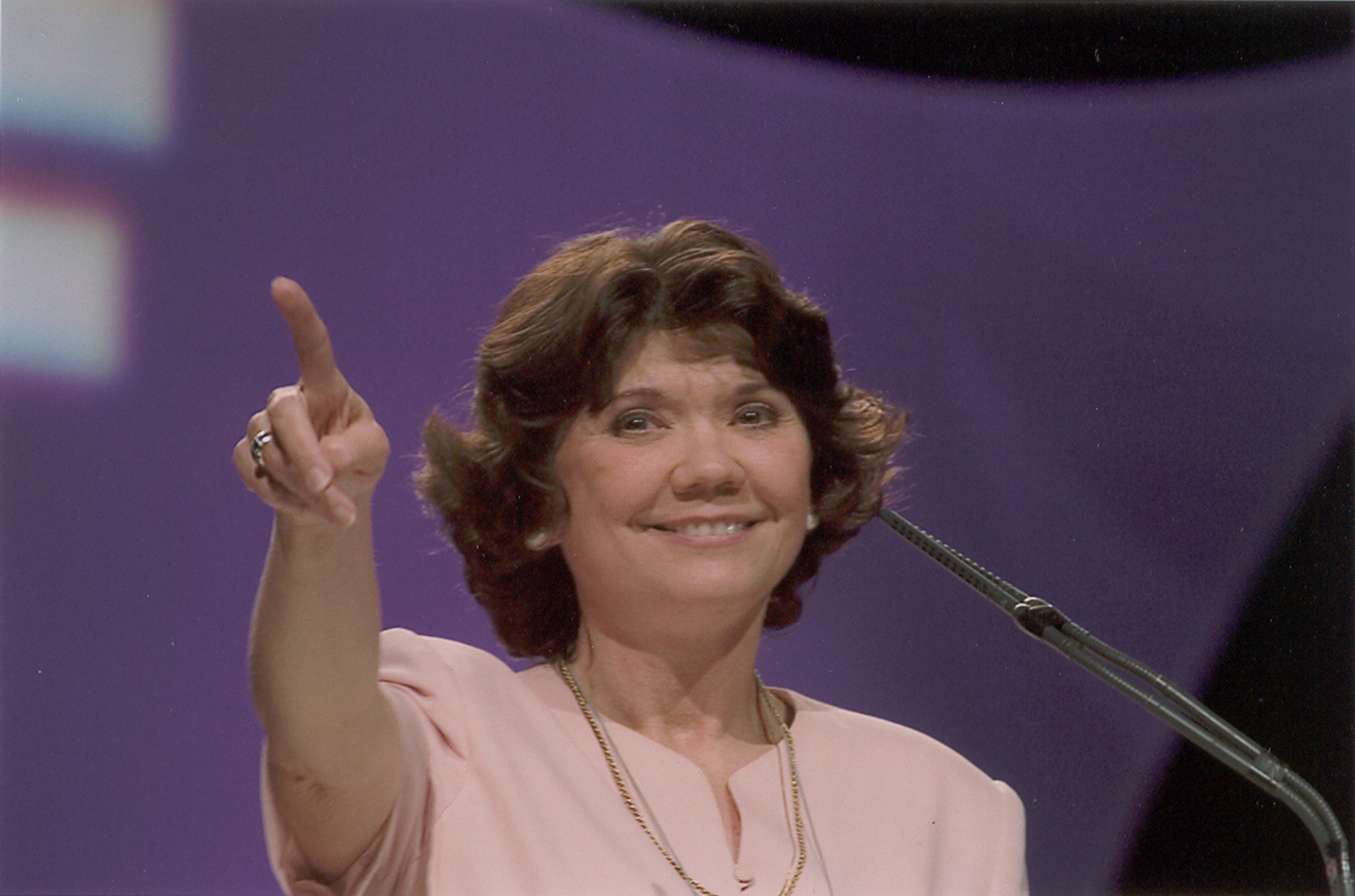

She received the 2004 National Organization for Women Woman of Courage Award for carrying out and disseminating the results of the Nelson Diversity Surveys.

Nelson's diversity research has been cited by dozens of newspapers, magazines, and journals, including Nature, The New York Times, The Christian Science Monitor, and CNN. The Government Accountability Office used Nelson's data for its July 2004 report to Congress on Title IX, specifically women's access to opportunities in the sciences. Nelson has also written about diversity in the STEM fields for outlets, such as PBS and the Association for Women in Science.

==== Harvard President Lawrence Summers remarks about differences between the sexes ====
Dr. Nelson presented results of her Nelson Diversity Surveys at the January 2005 Conference on Diversifying the Science & Engineering Workforce sponsored by the National Bureau of Economic Research. Shortly afterwards, Dr. Nelson and several others of the ~40 attendees received many calls from press. At his lunchtime talk for this conference, then-Harvard President Lawrence Summers had given three hypotheses for the higher proportion of men in high-end science and engineering positions, which were considered controversial by many. Reporters said they were told that no transcript of the talk existed, so Nelson suggested that they instead request a copy of the recording of the talk which had been made by President Summers's accompanying undergraduate assistant. During Q&A after his talk, recognizing that the recording might be of interest, Nelson posed the first two questions, which alerted attendees that the talk had been recorded. The suggestion that reporters request the recording eventually led to the creation and release of a transcript of his remarks.

=== Image of science and scientists in society ===
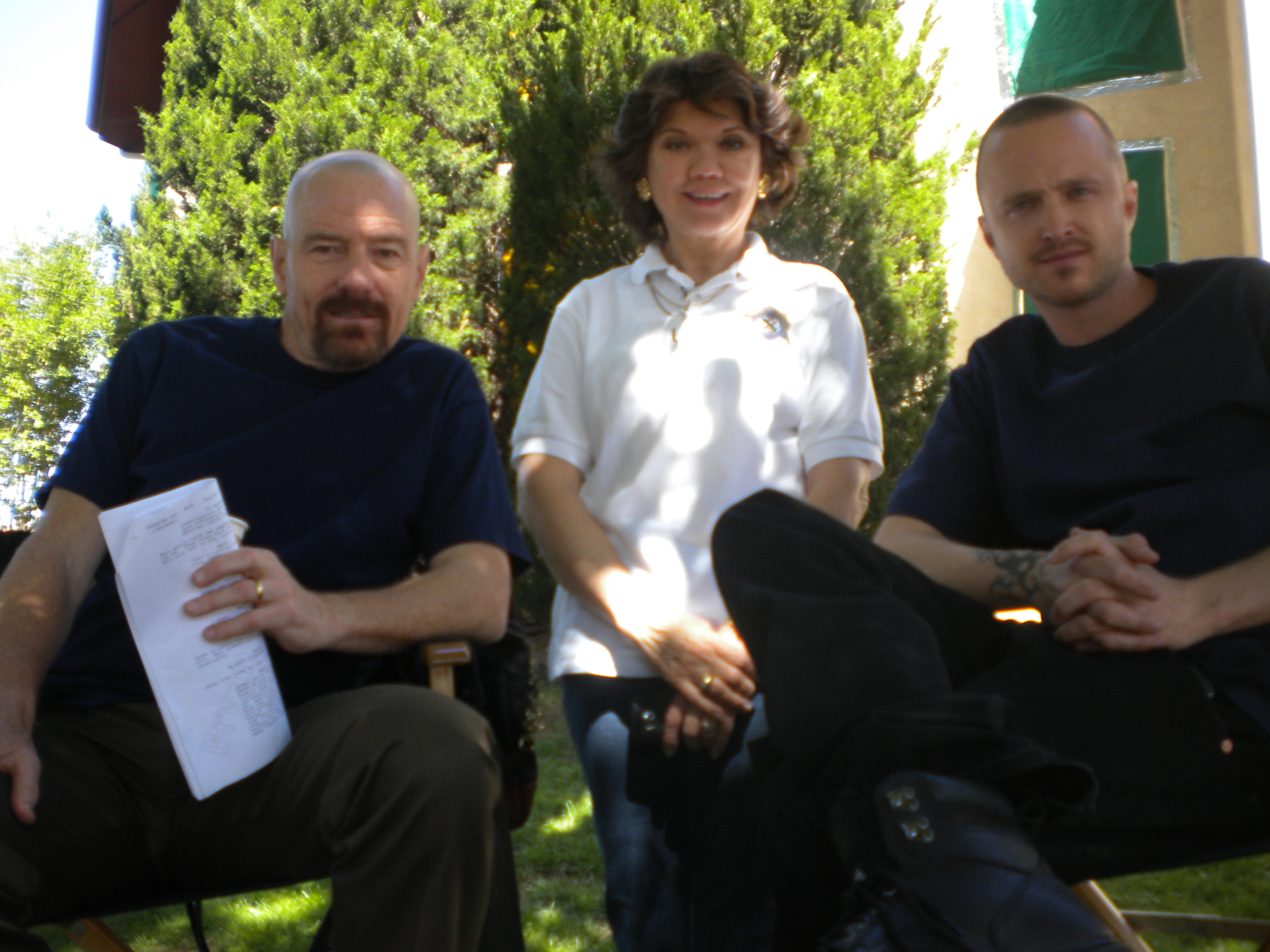
Dr. Donna J. Nelson, science advisor to AMC's television series Breaking Bad, stands between Bryan Cranston (left) and Aaron Paul, during a set visit in Albuquerque, NM., in May 2013.

==== Science advisor to AMC TV series Breaking Bad ====
Nelson is a proponent of scientific accuracy in television, film and other media. She was the science adviser for the AMC TV series, Breaking Bad. After a plea for scientific help from the show's creator, Vince Gilligan, Nelson volunteered to advise the show in regards to organic chemistry. Nelson checked scripts and provided dialogue for the show and also drew chemical structures and wrote chemical equations which were used as props. According to Gilligan, "[Because] Walter White was talking to his students, I was able to dumb down certain moments of description and dialogue in the early episodes which held me until we had some help from some honest-to-god chemists. We have a [chemist] named Dr. Donna Nelson at the University of Oklahoma who is very helpful to us and vets our scripts to make sure our chemistry dialogue is accurate and up to date. We also have a chemist with the Drug Enforcement Association based out of Dallas who has just been hugely helpful to us."

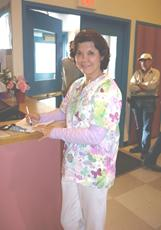
Photo of Dr. Donna J. Nelson taken during Breaking Bad set visit May 12, 2011.

Gilligan said, "Dr. Donna Nelson from the University of Oklahoma approached us several seasons back and said, 'I really like this show, and if you ever need help with the chemistry, I'd love to lend a hand.' She's been a wonderful advisor. We get help wherever we need it, whether it's chemistry, electrical engineering, or physics. We try to get everything correct. There's no full-time [advisor] on set, but we run certain scenes by these experts first." Nelson spoke of Gilligan's interest in having the science right, "[He] said it made a difference to him."

During a set visit in Albuquerque on May 12, 2011, she was filmed for a cameo appearance as a nursing home attendant, but the scene was cut. However, it can be found among the deleted scenes for season 4.

==== "Hollywood Chemistry" symposia ====
In order to span the science and entertainment communities, she organized a "Hollywood Chemistry" symposium at the March 2011 ACS National Meeting at Anaheim, CA. The symposium was so well-received that she was asked to organize a second symposium for the August 2011 ACS National Meeting at Denver, CO, "Science on the Hollywood Screen."

==== Science advisor to Hollywood productions and other contributions ====
She participated in the "Geek of the Week" program of David Saltzberg, by visiting the set of The Big Bang Theory in March 2013 and again in March 2014, in addition to answering a few chemistry-related questions. Dr. Nelson also served as Science Advisor for the 2024 disaster film Twisters and for the 2024 TV miniseries documentary The Godfather of Fentanyl.

In the 2011 Ig Nobel Awards, she gave a 24/7 presentation on her SWCNT research, in which she gave a technical talk appropriate for scientists to describe the work in 24 seconds, followed by 7 words which would clarify the work to all laypeople. The seven words were "SWCNT analyses should be shaken, not stored." She gave advice on background, terminology, pronunciation, and the retrosynthesis and total synthesis of haplophytine to a production of the musical Triangle at the Lyric Theatre in Oklahoma City.

==== Native Americans and diabetes ====
She collaborated with Native American tribes to determine incidences in, effects of, and attitudes toward diabetes in Oklahoma Native Americans.

== Activities as American Chemical Society president ==
Because the American Chemical Society (ACS) is the world's largest scientific society, with over 150,000 members, activities of its president can influence science and scientists globally. One theme of Dr. Nelson's ACS presidency was building and strengthening communities in chemistry. Many ACS international scientific alliances came during her term as President:

(1) A scientist exchange agreement was initiated with the Chemical Society of France.

(2) An ACS UAE Chapter was installed.

(3) During the 252nd ACS National Meeting in Philadelphia (August 18–24, 2016), she signed 5 Memos of Understanding (4 new and 1 renewal) on behalf of ACS.

(4) She represented the ACS in signing an agreement among 7 Pacific Rim countries to sponsor the 2020 International Chemical Congress of Pacific Basin Societies, Pacifichem 2020.

As ACS President, she spoke about building a global scientific community to scientific societies in several countries.
