= Nancy Hopkins (scientist) =

American molecular biologist

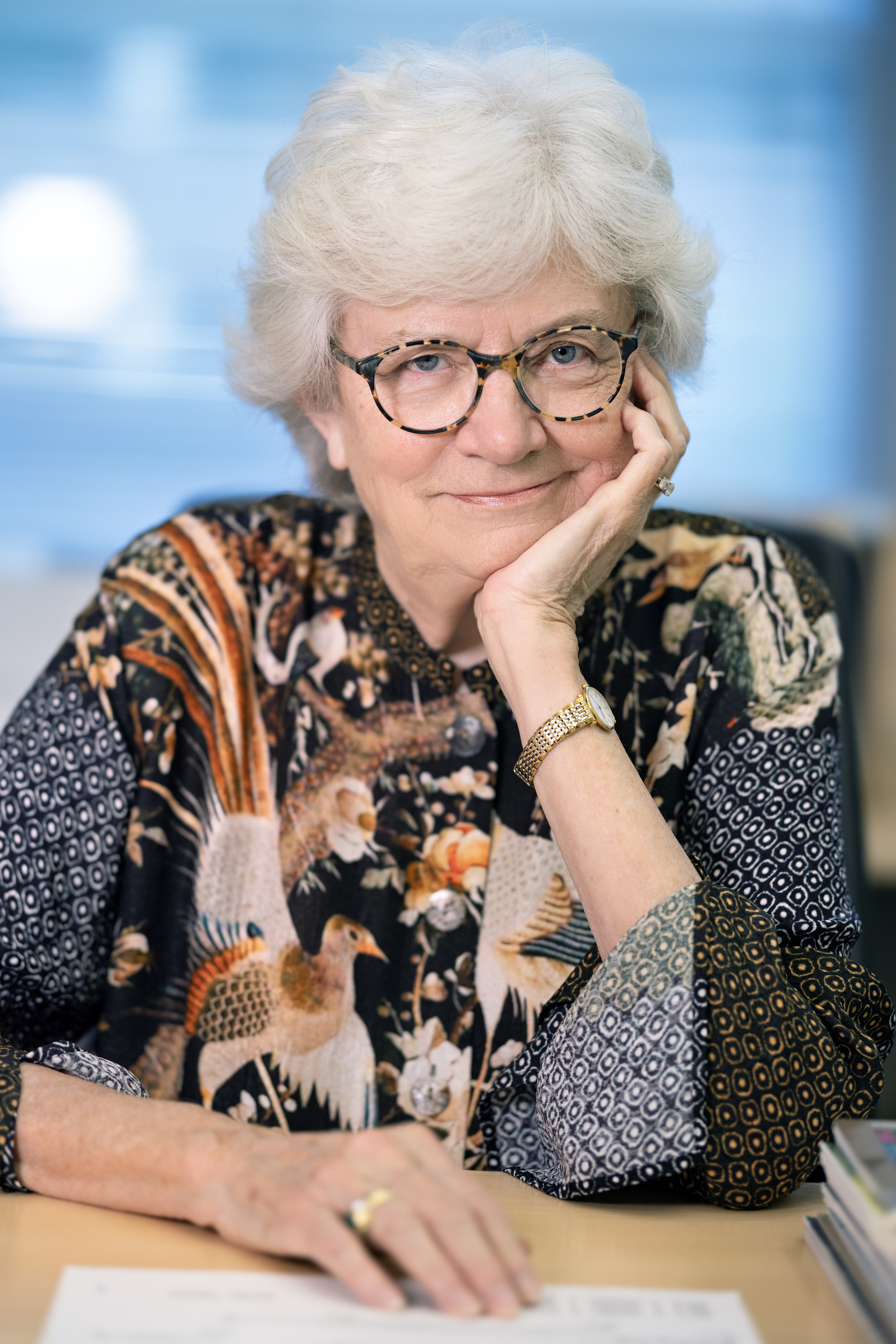
- Born: Nancy Doe; June 16, 1943 (age 83); New York City, US
- Education: Radcliffe College; Harvard
- Spouse(s): Brooke Hopkins (1967-1973); J. Dinsmore Adams Jr. (2007)
- Scientific career
- Fields: Biology
- Workplaces: MIT
- Website: https://biology.mit.edu/profile/nancy-hopkins/

Nancy Hopkins (née Doe, born June 16, 1943) is an American molecular biologist, currently the Amgen, Inc. Professor of Biology at the Massachusetts Institute of Technology. She is a member of the National Academy of Sciences, the Institute of Medicine of the National Academy, and the American Academy of Arts and Sciences. She is known for her research identifying genes required for zebrafish development, and for her earlier research on gene expression in the bacterial virus lambda, and on mouse RNA tumor viruses. She is also known for her work promoting equality of opportunity for women scientists in academia.

== Early life and education ==
Nancy Doe Hopkins was born in 1943 in New York City. Hopkins had many relatives involved in the fields of engineering and science.

Hopkins received her BA from Radcliffe College in 1964, and earned her PhD from the Department of Molecular Biology and Biochemistry at Harvard University in 1971, where she worked with Professor Mark Ptashne. With Ptashne she identified the operator sites on DNA to which the lambda repressor binds to control early gene expression and hence the viral life cycle. As a postdoctoral fellow of Nobel Laureate James D. Watson and Robert Pollack at the Cold Spring Harbor Lab she worked on DNA tumor viruses and cell biology, discovering that cells whose nucleus had been removed were able to re-establish normal morphology.

== Career and research ==
She joined the MIT faculty in the Center for Cancer Research in 1973 as an assistant professor and switched to work on RNA tumor viruses. She identified viral genes that determine host range and the type and severity of cancers mouse retroviruses cause, including importantly the capsid protein p30 and transcriptional elements that came to be known as enhancers. After a sabbatical in the lab of Nobel laureate Christiane Nusslein-Volhard in 1989, Hopkins switched fields to develop molecular technologies for working with zebrafish. With her postdoctoral fellow Shuo Lin, graduate students Adam Amsterdam and Nick Gaiano, and others in her lab she developed an efficient method for large-scale insertional mutagenesis in the fish. Using this technique her lab carried out a large genetic screen that identified and cloned 25% of the genes that are essential for a fertilized egg to develop into a free-swimming zebrafish larva. Among the genes identified was an unexpected class of genes which when mutated predispose fish to get cancer, and a set of genes that cause fish to develop cystic kidney and which overlap with genes that cause cystic kidney disease in humans.

== Retroviral insertional mutagenesis in zebrafish ==
In an effort to help maximize the utility of the zebrafish as a model organism, Hopkins and colleagues set out to develop a large-scale insertional mutagenesis method. Although large-scale chemical mutagenesis screens were getting underway in several zebrafish labs at the time (those of Mark Fishman in Boston, and Christiane Nusslein-Volhard in Tübingen, Germany), there were concerns in the community at the time that identifying the molecular lesions using positional cloning methods would be inefficient. Hopkins believed that insertional mutagenesis, which had been very successfully employed in invertebrate model organisms (D. melanogaster and C. elegans), would provide a valuable alternative or adjunct to the chemical screens.

== A Study on the Status of Women Faculty in Science at MIT ==
During the mid-90s, Hopkins discovered that she and other women were systematically discriminated against at MIT, receiving fewer research funds and less laboratory space than their male counterparts. In July 1994, together with 15 other women faculty in the School of Science at MIT, Hopkins drafted and co-signed a letter to the then-Dean of Science (now Chancellor of Berkeley) Robert Birgeneau, stating their evidence regarding gender discrimination. An ad-hoc committee was formed (with Hopkins as the initial chair) to investigate the issue of inequalities experienced by women faculty as a result of unconscious gender bias. The committee existed in two forms over the course of a four-year period and included both men and women faculty members, including men who were current or previous chairs of the departments of mathematics, chemistry, and physics.

A summary of the committee's findings, published in 1999 and endorsed by then-MIT president Charles Vest and then-dean Robert Birgeneau, is credited with launching a national re-examination of equity for women scientists. While some questioned the rigor of the analysis performed by the MIT committee, MIT's efforts are considered by many to be a laudable example of self-monitoring by an institute of higher education.

The study also led to 9 research universities, including MIT, forming an ongoing collaboration to study and address issues of gender equity. The group includes Harvard University, Stanford University, California Institute of Technology, Princeton University, University of Pennsylvania, University of Michigan, Yale University, and University of California, Berkeley, in addition to MIT. Hopkins involved many experts, who were researching the status of women and minorities among faculty, in these collaborations. At the MIT-9 meetings, Donna Nelson presented the Nelson Diversity Surveys to compare the representation of women among faculty at these individual universities versus the national data.

In 2020, Hopkins appeared in the Tribeca Film Festival in the film "Picture a Scientist", presenting the MIT study.

== Harassment incident by Francis Crick ==
Hopkins stated that when she was an undergraduate in the 1960s, Francis Crick put his hands on her breasts during a lab visit. She described the incident: "Before I could rise and shake hands, he had zoomed across the room, stood behind me, put his hands on my breasts and said, 'What are you working on?'"

== Walk-out protest of comments by then-Harvard-President Larry Summers ==
In January 2005, at an NBER meeting in Cambridge, MA on the topic of how to address the under-representation of women and minorities in science and engineering fields, Hopkins caused controversy by walking out in protest during a talk by then President of Harvard Lawrence Summers when he speculated that one reason for the very small number of high-achieving women in science and engineering fields might be “intrinsic aptitude” (specifically that the bell-curve of aptitude is flatter for men than women). Her action became public when she replied to an e-mail from Boston Globe reporter Marcella Bombardieri inquiring about Summers’ speech. Bombardieri's report of Summers’ speech set off a national discussion of gender discrimination, and academic freedom, and contributed to Summers’ resignation as the President of Harvard.

== Honors and awards ==
- Fellow, American Academy of Arts and Sciences (1998)
- Member, Institute of Medicine (now the National Academy of Medicine) (1999)
- UCSF Medal, University of California San Francisco (2003)
- Elected Member, National Academy of Sciences (2004)
- AACR-Women in Cancer Research Charlotte Friend Memorial Lectureship, American Association for Cancer Research (2006)
- Margaret L. Kripke Legend Award, MD Anderson Cancer Center (2012)
- Harvard Centennial Medal, Harvard Graduate School of Arts and Sciences (2014)
- Honorary Doctorate, Trinity College Dublin (2014)
- Alice C. Evans Award, American Society for Microbiology (2015)
- Helen Dean King Award, The Wistar Institute (2017)
- Honorary Doctorate, Rockefeller University (2019)
- Honorary Doctorate, Hong Kong University of Science and Technology (2021)
- George Streisinger Award, International Zebrafish Society (2021)
- Fellow, American Association for Cancer Research Academy (2021)
- Biomedical Innovation Award, STAT (2021)
- Public Welfare Medal, National Academy of Sciences (2024)
- STATUS List, STAT (2025)

== Personal life ==
Hopkins has been married to J. Dinsmore Adams Jr. (known as Dinny) since 2007.
