= Matilda Black Bear =

Lakota Sioux activist

Matilda "Tillie" Black Bear
- Wa Wokiye Win
- Born: Matilda Laura Black Bear; December 10, 1946; Rosebud Indian Reservation
- Died: July 19, 2014 (aged 67)
- Education: St. Francis Indian School; Northern State University, Bachelor of Science, University of South Dakota, Master of Arts
- Years active: 1978-2014
- Known for: Anti-domestic violence activist

Matilda "Tillie" Black Bear (Lakota: Wa Wokiye Win, meaning Woman Who Helps Everyone; December 10, 1946 – July 19, 2014) was a Lakota anti-domestic violence activist known as the Grandmother (Unci) of the Grassroots Movement of Safety for Native Women. She worked as an activist, therapist, school counselor, nonprofit administrator, and college instructor.

== Early life ==
Black Bear was born on December 10 on the Rosebud Indian Reservation as the third child of eleven children. She was baptized the day after her birth as Matilda Laura Black Bear, and raised Catholic. Her Lakota name, Wa Wokiye Win, means "woman who helps everyone." She was a citizen of the Rosebud Sioux Tribe and Sicangu Lakota Nation. She and her family, like many other Native Americans in the 1950s, were forbidden to practice their spiritual ways, and her childhood included fighting federal policies that forbade their spiritual practices. The Black Bears traveled to Washington, D.C. in the 1950s to press Congress to allow Rosebud's citizens to openly hold religious ceremonies. They were successful and were among the first families to bring the Sun Dance back to Rosebud, a victory in their Indian community. One of the teachings that she was taught that was influential throughout her life was that of the White Buffalo Calf Woman, who taught that women were to be respected. Black Bear greatly credits her character from the example her family set, believing that all the effort and resistance she was surrounded by at a young age helped her become the woman she lived on to be.

In first grade, Black Bear was torn from her family and forced to attend the St. Francis Indian School, a Catholic mission at the time. During this time, she only returned to her family during winter and summer breaks. At first, she struggled to learn English at the boarding school, only being able to speak very little but gradually became fluent. Despite this, she continued to speak the traditional Lakota language at home.

After graduating from high school, Black Bear attended Northern State University and earned a master's degree from the University of South Dakota.

In 1974, Black Bear's partner became abusive and began to beat her frequently, and it was when he was drunk he would quickly go from calm to violent and aggressive. When he started to hit her young daughters, though, Black Bear showed no tolerance and ejected him from her home, to which he complied and left.

== Advocacy ==
After kicking out her abusive partner in the early 1970s, Black Bear began opening her home to friends as a safe house. The lack of enforcement of laws in the reservations that protected Native Americans allowed for the majority of violence. Black Bear was very aware of the violence that was occurring and seeing the need for her work, she began a doctorate in counseling at the University of South Dakota. Though tending to the refuge her house turned into prevented her from completing her degree.

Black Bear founded the White Buffalo Calf Woman Society to end domestic and sexual violence in 1977. She continued to serve as the organization's executive director.

In January 1978, Faith Spotted Eagle contacted Black Bear to take her place to discuss domestic violence in the Indian community at the U.S. Commission of Civil Rights symposium on domestic violence. Black Bear spoke about the basic resources that help women confront domestic violence that were absent on Rosebud, like housing assistance, education, and child care. She recalls having to use the men's restroom at the event as there wasn't a single women's restroom in the entire building, highlighting the rarity it was for women to be present among government processes such as this, even when it directly involved them.

Later that year, Black Bear became a founding member of the National Coalition Against Domestic Violence. She also founded the more local South Dakota Coalition Ending Domestic Violence and Sexual Assault. She also organized the South Dakota Commission on the Status of Women's first coalition meeting.

In 1980, the White Buffalo Calf Woman Society opened a shelter for abused and raped Native women, the oldest shelter on an Indian reservation and the first American shelter for women of color.

Black Bear continued to advocate for federal legislation, notably advocating in relation to the Violence Against Women Act (VAWA), the Family Violence Protection and Services Act, and the Tribal Law and Order Act. In 1988, Black Bear was the first woman of color to chair the National Coalition Against Domestic Violence board.

In 1995, after VAWA passed, Black Bear met with the Department of Justice to advocate for its inclusion of Indian tribes. She saw tribal sovereignty as a vital part of preventing gender-based violence in the American Indian community. In 2000, she helped create the VAWA tribal coalition program. In 2003, she led a Wiping of the Tears ceremony at the Senate Building, launching the struggle for the VAWA 2005 Safety for Indian Women Act. This advocacy was pivotal in regard to the 2013 tribal provision in the Violence Against Women Act, which restored tribes' ability to prosecute non-native defendants in Indian Country for domestic violence.

== Death and legacy ==
Black Bear died on July 19, 2014, at the age of 67. In 2017, nearly five hundred organizations supported the National Indigenous Women's Resource Center's call to establish October 1 as Tillie Black Bear Women Are Sacred Day, which has since been held annually. She was a founding mother of the National Coalition Against Domestic Violence and inspired thousands to make a stand against domestic violence for all people and the duty the federal authorities had to make that happen. Black Bear became a model of excellence in her Rosebud reservation community and for all Native Americans alike. She leaves her mark as an incredible female figure of color who advocated for the minority she was a part of during a time when it was most difficult.

== Honors ==
- 1988: award from the U.S. Department of Justice
- 1989: Points of Light Honoree, from President George H.W. Bush
- 1999 Millennium Conference on Domestic Violence in Chicago, Black Bear was one of ten people who were recognized as the founders of the U.S. anti-domestic violence movement.
- 2000: Eleanor Roosevelt Human Rights Award, from President Bill Clinton
- 2003: First annual Lifetime Achievement Award, Lifetime Television
- 2004: 21 Leaders for the 21st Century, Women's eNews
- 2005: Woman of Courage Award, National Organization for Women
