= Barbara Hillary =

American adventurer (1931–2019)

- Born: June 12, 1931; Manhattan, New York
- Died: November 23, 2019 (aged 88); Queens, New York
- Education: New School University
- Occupations: Arctic Explorer, Nurse, Adventurer, Speaker
- Known for: First black woman to reach the North and South poles

Barbara Hillary (June 12, 1931 – November 23, 2019) was an American Arctic explorer, nurse, publisher, adventurer, and inspirational speaker. Born in New York City, she attended The New School, from which she earned bachelor's and master's degrees in gerontology. Following her education, she became a nurse as well as founding the Arverne Action Association and the Peninsula Magazine.

In 2007 at the age of 75, Hillary became the second known black woman to reach the North Pole. She reached the South Pole in January 2011 at the age of 79, becoming the first African-American woman on record to make it there and simultaneously the first black woman to reach both poles. Following her ventures to the North and South poles she became an inspirational speaker, addressing organizations such as the National Organization for Women.

Having survived breast cancer in her 20s and lung cancer in her 60s, her health began to decline in 2019. After being admitted to a hospital in Far Rockaway, New York, she died on November 23, 2019, at the age of 88.

== Personal life ==
Hillary was born on June 12, 1931, in New York City in an area now known as the Lincoln Square neighborhood (formerly San Juan Hill, Manhattan). She was raised in Harlem by her mother Viola Jones Hillary, her father having died while she was two. Hillary grew up impoverished—her mother cleaned homes to support the family—but she spent much of her time reading: "there was no such thing as mental poverty in our home." One of her favorite books was the adventure novel Robinson Crusoe. She attended the New School in New York City where she majored in gerontology, earning both her Bachelor of Arts and master's degrees. Following her graduation from the New School, she became a nurse, practicing for 55 years before retiring.

Around 1998, Hillary was diagnosed with lung cancer which required surgery to remove. This surgery resulted in a 25 percent reduction in her breathing capacity. This was her second cancer diagnosis, having been diagnosed with breast cancer in her 20s. She became ill in early 2019 as fluid accumulated in her heart valve. Despite the illness, she still managed to travel to Mongolia to raise awareness of the effects of climate change on societies there. After months of declining health, she was hospitalized and later died on November 23, 2019, in Far Rockaway, New York.

=== Activism ===
Hillary was active in her community. She was the founder of the Arverne Action Association, Inc., a group dedicated to improving life in Arverne, New York and the Rockaway Peninsula Community. She was also founder and Editor-in-Chief of The Peninsula Magazine, a non-profit and multi-racial magazine in the New York City borough of Queens. This magazine was the first of its kind in the region. After visiting the poles, Hillary took interest in the effects of climate change on the polar ice caps and the world beyond and took to public lecturing on the topic. In 2019 she traveled to the Mongolian steppe to visit a community whose cultural traditions are threatened by climate change.

== Adventurer ==
=== Trips to the North and South poles ===
After retiring from nursing, Hillary sought adventure dog-sledding in Quebec and photographing polar bears in Manitoba. When she learned that no black woman had reached the North Pole, she was determined to become the first one to do so. A polar expedition at the time cost around $20,000 and required her to ski, which she had never done before. To raise funds, she sent letters to potential sponsors and took in donations, eventually raising over $25,000 to fund her expedition to the Arctic. To prepare for her journey she took cross-country ski lessons, hired a personal trainer and worked out with weights. On April 23, 2007, at the age of 75, she became one of the oldest people to set foot on the North Pole, and the first black woman.

Five years later, she became the first African-American woman on record to stand on the South Pole at age 79, on January 6, 2011.

Following her expeditions, Hillary became an inspirational speaker. She was profiled by NBC News and CNN.com, and gave speeches at various organizations such as the National Organization for Women (NOW).

Hillary dedicated her travel to the North Pole to her mother, Viola Jones Hillary, who moved from the "Low country" of Hilton Head Island, South Carolina to New York City in the 1930s to give Barbara and her sister, Dorothy Hillary Aranda, a chance for a better education. Barbara Hillary's father died when she was only one year old.

=== Awards and honors ===
- 2007 – The United States House of Representatives passed a resolution recognizing and honoring her achievement in reaching the North Pole.
- 2008 – Received the Woman of Courage Award from the National Organization for Women.
- 2020 - Inducted into the National Women's Hall of Fame.
