= Burke Marshall =

American lawyer (1922–2003)

Assistant United States Attorney General for the Civil Rights Division
- In office 1961 – December 1964

Personal details
- Born: October 1, 1922 Plainfield, New Jersey, U.S.
- Died: June 2, 2003 (aged 80) Newtown, Connecticut, U.S.
- Party: Democratic
- Spouse: Violet P. Marshall
- Children: Catie Marshall, Jane Marshall and Josie Phillips
- Education: Yale University (BA, LLD)
- Occupation: Attorney

Burke Marshall (October 1, 1922 – June 2, 2003) was an American lawyer who served as the United States Assistant Attorney General for the Civil Rights Division during the Civil Rights Movement. He was a confidante of the Kennedy family.

Marshall was born in Plainfield, New Jersey. He attended Phillips Exeter Academy, graduating in 1940, and received a BA from Yale University in 1943. He joined the army, working in the intelligence corps as a Japanese translator and cryptoanalyst. It was during his military service that he met Violet Person, whom he later married.

After World War II, Marshall returned to Yale Law School, earning his LL.D. in 1951; he was admitted to the Washington, D.C., bar the same year, joining the Washington-based law firm of Covington & Burling in 1952, where he worked for ten years, specializing in antitrust law for clients such as Standard Oil.

== Government career ==
External videos
- “Eyes on the Prize; Interview with Burke Marshall” conducted in 1985 for the Eyes on the Prize documentary.

Marshall was appointed Assistant Attorney General in 1961 by Robert F. Kennedy, who was Attorney General in President John F. Kennedy's administration. Despite Marshall's lack of civil rights experience, he was put in charge of the Civil Rights Division, as Robert Kennedy had already decided not to appoint a known rights leader.

The relationship between Marshall and Kennedy had a difficult beginning. During their initial meeting, little was said, with Kennedy remarking, "I have nothing in common with that man." However, as the civil rights movement heated up in the South, events brought them together.

During his time in government, Marshall was a significant contributor to a number of advances in civil rights. In 1961, racial segregation on interstate travel was banned. The following year, the University of Mississippi was forced to admit James Meredith, a well-qualified black student. Marshall and the Attorney General persuaded President Kennedy to enforce the order using federal troops.

Marshall also ran a campaign to increase voter registration by blacks. Within two years of coming into office, he had launched 42 federal lawsuits against states to reform their electoral legislation.

Marshall's focus was on results. He argued to not use the Fourteenth Amendment to overcome discrimination, instead favoring the federal government's constitutional power to regulate interstate commerce. As that power was reserved to the government, states had few legal options of recourse. Marshall used it as a basis to write the 1964 Civil Rights Act, which prohibited discrimination in public facilities, in government and in employment.

Marshall's reputation was not that of an office-based bureaucrat, but of a hands-on negotiator who dealt with many of the major figures across the civil rights drama, ranging from Martin Luther King Jr. to Alabama Governor George Wallace.

Marshall resigned his office in December 1964. President Lyndon B. Johnson wrote on Marshall's formal letter of resignation, "I have never known any person who rendered a better quality of public service."

== Later career ==
After leaving government, Marshall returned to commercial legal practice, briefly rejoining Covington and Burling before becoming a vice president and general counsel at IBM in 1965. He rose to senior vice president in 1969. Despite turning down the offer of a deanship at Yale Law School (YLS) when he resigned as Assistant Attorney General, he became a deputy dean and professor at YLS in 1970.

In 1986, he was named Nicholas deB. Katzenbach Professor of Law, and later professor emeritus. He was also the George W. Crawford Professorial Lecturer in Law. At the Yale Law School, Marshall taught courses in constitutional law, federal jurisdiction, and political and civil rights. Among his most innovative and well-known courses was "The Limits of the Law," which he co-taught at first with Professor Joseph Goldstein and later with both Professor Goldstein and Aharon Barak, Chief Justice of the Israel Supreme Court. He also co-taught a course on Religion and the Law with Professor Perry Dane at a time when that subject was rarely taught as a course to itself at major law schools.

Marshall was the chair of the Vera Institute of Justice Board of Trustees between 1966 and 1986. He also chaired the Center for Employment Opportunities in 1996. In 1999, he received the Eleanor Roosevelt Award for Human Rights.

== Death ==
Marshall died June 2, 2003, aged 80, at his home in Newtown, Connecticut, of complications of myelodysplasia, a bone marrow disorder.

He was survived by his wife Violet P. Marshall, three daughters, Catie Marshall, Jane Marshall, both of Brooklyn, New York, and Josie Phillips of Plymouth, England, as well as four grandchildren: Ian Marshall Bakerman and Morgan Montgomery Bakerman of Catie Marshall and Nelson Bakerman; and James Marshall Phillips and Samuel Burke Phillips, who are the sons of Josie and Greg Phillips.
