= Frank Messina =

American poet and author

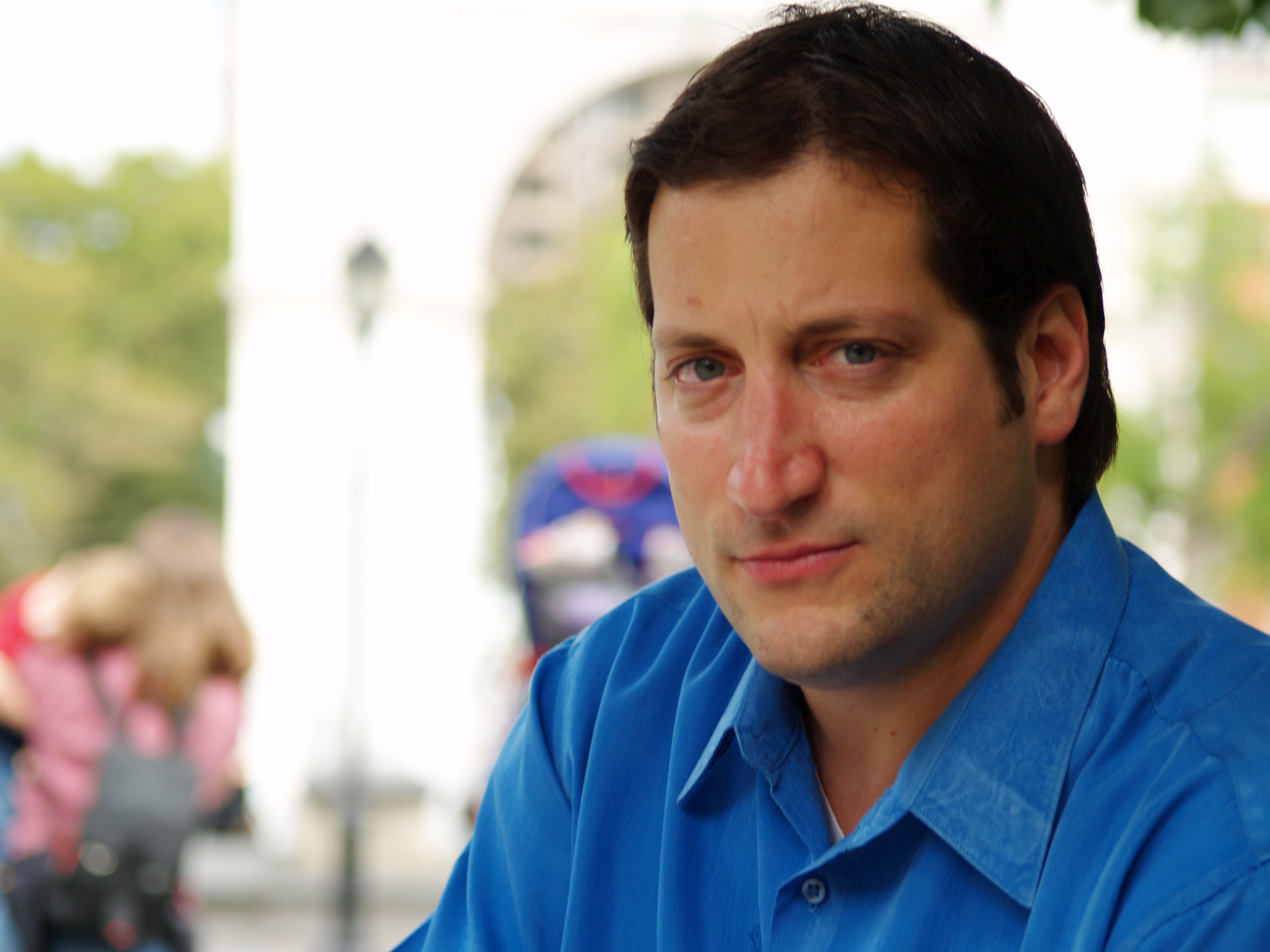
- Messina in October 2007
- Born: c. 1968; United States
- Education: St. Thomas Aquinas College
- Occupations: Poet; author; performance artist
- Notable work: Full Count: The Book of Mets Poetry; Disorderly Conduct
- Awards: Woolrich Poetry Award; Columbia University Fellowship

Frank Messina (born c. 1968) is an American poet, author and performance artist.

Among his four published works, Messina is the author of Full Count: The Book of Mets Poetry, a 2009 work that focused on baseball fanaticism. His 2002 book, Disorderly Conduct, focused on reactions to the September 11 terrorist attacks and is based on his experience as a volunteer for three days at Liberty State Park assisting rescue workers at Ground Zero. He has performed on stage with musicians such as members of Phish, the Spin Doctors and Sun Ra Arkestra and composer David Amram. On September 11, 2011, Messina performed his poem, "Bicycle", at Symphony Space in New York City to mark the tenth anniversary of the attacks, and was accompanied by Amram on piano.

== Early life and education ==
Messina grew up in Norwood, New Jersey, with a father who had been a fan of the New York Giants. Several members of the New York Yankees resided in Norwood during Messina's youth — including Ron Guidry, Catfish Hunter and Graig Nettles — and he played Little League Baseball with some of their sons. He attended Northern Valley Regional High School at Old Tappan and is an alumnus of St. Thomas Aquinas College. He is currently a resident of Jersey City.

== Career ==
A fan and season ticket holder of the New York Mets, Messina attends games wearing a replica team jersey emblazoned with "The Poet" on the back of the jersey. He had performed his poetry at Shea Stadium, though he has no official role with the team. A recital of his poem Leaping Gazelle, a tribute to the athletic abilities of outfielder Endy Chávez, was recorded on Shea's outfield grass in June 2007. Messina's poetry has been featured on several occasions on Mets Weekly, shown on SportsNet New York and read on the air on WFAN, a New York-area sports radio station. In August 2006, SportsNet New York filmed Messina at Shea and at several of his performances around New York City, which were broadcast in segments later that year. Fans refer to him as "The Mets Poet".

Messina for years has brought poetry to large audiences and it's not uncommon for him to be seen reading his work in theaters, stadiums and at public forums.

Messina was recognized with the Woolrich Poetry Award and Fellowship of Columbia University in 1993, and was nominated for the Allen Ginsberg Poetry Award in 1995. In 2013, his original hand-written journal of 9/11-related poetry was accessioned into the permanent collection of the National September 11 Memorial & Museum in New York City.

== See also ==
- Frank Messina: An interview with the 'Mets Poet' from Wikinews
