= Jean M. Marshall =

American professor and nun

Sister Jean M. Marshall O. P.

Personal life
- Born: January 20, 1942 The Bronx, New York
- Died: May 7, 2014 (aged 72) Nyack, New York

Religious life
- Religion: Roman Catholic

Jean M. Marshall (1942-2014, Sister Rita Vincent) was a Dominican Sister of Sparkill, New York. She founded St. Rita's Center for Immigrant and Refugee Services food distribution center, serving Cambodian, Vietnamese, and many other refugees and immigrants in the Fordham section of the Bronx, New York. In 1999 President Bill Clinton honored her at the White House with the Eleanor Roosevelt Human Rights Award.

== Early life, religious vocation, and education ==
She was born in the Bronx, New York, the daughter of Rita (Cullen) Marshall and Coleman V. Marshall (Vincent). She went to Monsignor Scanlan High School. She became a novice in the Dominican Congregation of Our Lady of the Rosary in Sparkill, New York, entering on September 8, 1959 and taking the name Sister Rita Vincent. In 1961 she took her first vows, and in 1966 she made her final vows. She went to St. Thomas Aquinas College in Sparkill, New York, and later earned a master's degree in education from the City College of New York. She also earned a certificate in multicultural studies and guidance counseling from the Spring Institute for Intercultural Learning in Denver, Colorado.

== Teaching ==
Marshall taught elementary school in the Archdiocese of New York, and the Brooklyn diocese. From 1961-62 she taught at St. Joseph's School in the Bronx; from 1962-65 and again from 1977-83 she taught at the now-closed St. Rose of Lima elementary school in Manhattan; from 1965-68 she was at Our Lady of Perpetual Help in Richmond Hill, New York; from 1968-69 she taught at St. Agnes school in Sparkill, New York; and from 1969-77 she was based at St. John Chrysostom in the Bronx.

== Work with refugees and immigrants ==
She established Saint Rita’s Center September, 1983 in the Fordham section of the Bronx to give refugees and immigrants a starting place from which to build their lives, often following war, conflict, and violence. She was inspired to start it after a Dominican sister was shot in the face in Cambodia in 1981, saying "She was and is my hero." In 1994 she told a reporter for Newsday:

Before St. Rita's, there was no agency in the Bronx helping these people. I found people picking garbage off the street and feeding it to their kids. . . . We've had over 11,000 people pass through here.... I want to expand services to include a cultural center for all refugees. I want a place where they can have a party or a wedding and not pay a huge amount of money. I want to get enough space to create a pre-GED and a GED classroom. My commitment is total. I want justice for these people and will fight for them till my dying day.

She was fluent in Spanish and also in Khmer, the language of Cambodia. Her bi- and even tri-lingual (or more) staff and volunteers offered the following services:

English as a Second Language (ESL)	Literacy and tutoring in English
Citizenship education classes	Medical and dental screenings
Legal services with volunteer lawyers	Job referrals and vocational ESL
Youth programs, elementary	Youth programs, high school
Recreation	Interpretation/translation
Remedial summer school	Food pantry
Mass in Vietnamese, Khmer, etc.	

The center serves about 500 people daily. Funding has always been a concern.

== Award ==
- 1999, Eleanor Roosevelt Human Rights Award. President Bill Clinton said that St. Rita's helped "thousands of refugees, from Vietnam to Cambodia to Bosnia, to find jobs, learn English, live better lives."
