= Eleanor Roosevelt Human Rights Award =

United States award

Eleanor Roosevelt Award for Human Rights
- Description: Honors outstanding promoters of human rights in the United States.
- Presented by: President of the United States
- Eligibility: U.S. citizens or organizations
- Hosted by: United States Department of State
- Status: Inactive (primarily 1998–2001)
- Website: http://www.jwj.org/about-us/past-honorees

The Eleanor Roosevelt Award for Human Rights was established in 1998 by American president Bill Clinton to honor outstanding promoters of rights in the United States.

The award was first given on the 50th anniversary of the Universal Declaration of Human Rights, honoring Eleanor Roosevelt's role as the "driving force" in the development of the UN's Universal Declaration of Human Rights. The award was presented from 1998 to the end of the Clinton administration in 2001.

== Recipients ==
Recipients of the Eleanor Roosevelt Human Rights Award
Name	Year	Reason	Ref(s)
Robert L. Bernstein	1998	Founder of Human Rights Watch and retired chairman of Random House.	
John Lewis	1998	Lifelong civil rights leader.	
Bette Bao Lord	1998	Human rights activist, China scholar and novelist.	
Dorothy Thomas	1998	Activist responsible for research and advocacy on human-rights violations against women.	
Charlotte Bunch	1999	An international women's rights activist instrumental in securing the inclusion of gender and sexual orientation on the global human rights agenda.	
Dolores Huerta	1999	Cofounder and leader of the United Farm Workers of America and lifelong labor activist.	
Burke Marshall	1999	Assistant Attorney General in the Kennedy administration.	
Jean Marshall	1999	A Dominican nun who founded St. Rita's Immigrant and Refugee Center in the Bronx to service to victimized immigrants.	
Leon Sullivan	1999	Anti-apartheid activist and author of the Global Sullivan Principles promoting corporate social responsibility.	
Tillie Black Bear	2000	A strong voice for Native American and women's rights and a leading advocate for victims of domestic violence.	
Frederick Charles Cuny	2000	A lifetime of service to the civilian victims of conflict and disaster.	
Norman Dorsen	2000	Former president of the American Civil Liberties Union and chairman of the board of the Lawyers Committee for Human Rights (now known as Human Rights First).	
Elaine R. Jones	2000	Represented the Legal Defence Fund in landmark cases before the Supreme Court.	
Theodore Edgar McCarrick	2000	Lifelong human rights advocate.	
Frank Wolf	2001	Worked for the passage of human-rights legislation including the International Religious Freedom Act of 1998 and legislation on human trafficking.	
John Kamm	2001	Engaged the Chinese government regarding human rights.	
Barbara Elliott	2001	Started a private initiative to help victims of communism following the fall of the Berlin Wall.	
Louis Henkin	2010	Major figure in developing the study of human-rights law.	
Alice Hartman Henkin	2010	Director of the Justice and Society Program at the Aspen Institute.	
Wade Henderson	2010	Led the Leadership Conference on Civil and Human Rights.	
Sarah Cleto Rial	2010	Program director for My Sister's Keeper, a private organization supporting women and girls in Sudan.	//
