= Nelson Diversity Surveys =

Dataset for women and minority in academia

The Nelson Diversity Surveys (NDS) are a collection of data sets that quantify the representation of women and minorities among professors, by science and engineering discipline, at research universities. They consist of four data sets compiled by Donna Nelson, Professor of Chemistry at the University of Oklahoma during fiscal years (FY) 2002, 2005, 2007, and 2012 through the Diversity in Science Association. These surveys were each complete populations, rather than samples. Consequently, the Surveys quantified characteristics of the faculty which had never been revealed previously, drawing great attention from women and minorities. Furthermore, the Surveys initially came at a time when these underrepresented groups were becoming concerned and vocal about perceived inequities in academia. At the time the surveys were initiated, the MIT Study of 1999, expressing the concerns of women scientists (including Nancy Hopkins), had just been issued, and underrepresented minority (URM) science faculty noticed URM students increase among PhD recipients without a corresponding increase among recently hired professors. Data sets like the NDS, along with similar research available through the NSF, allowed URM faculty to track the progress of diversity efforts in the STEM fields. As noted by the Women's Institute for Policy Research, progress has been slow for under-represented women in the sciences.

The NDS quantified the degree to which women and minorities are underrepresented on science and engineering faculties at research universities. Because the surveys were complete populations and disaggregated, the degree of underrepresentation was revealed, in ways it had never been revealed previously. For example, the FY 2002 survey showed that there were no Black, Hispanic, or Native American tenured or tenure track women faculty in 50 computer science departments. It also revealed that there were no black or Native American assistant professors in the top 50 chemistry departments. Analogous surveys were carried out for top 100 departments in each of 15 science and engineering disciplines in fiscal years (FY) 2005, 2007 and 2012.

The Nelson Diversity Surveys made it possible for the first time to know the level and rate of faculty diversification, disaggregated by race, by rank, and by gender. Researchers in the 15 areas of science surveyed used these disaggregated faculty data, in order to compare against analogous student data, which had been available from NSF for decades. A new program to increase the representation of women and minorities among professors was implemented and PhD and MS research was based on data revealed by the NDS. The NDS were utilized by the National Science Foundation, National Institutes of Health, Department of Energy, US Congress, Sloan Foundation, the National Organization for Women, universities, and many other organizations interested in diversity in academics.

== Methodology ==
During 2001 to 2003, Nelson surveyed department chairs in order to collect headcounts of tenured and tenure-track university faculty members of each of 14 science and engineering disciplines (chemistry FY2001, physics, mathematics, chemical engineering, civil engineering, electrical engineering, mechanical engineering, computer science, political science, sociology, economics, biological sciences, psychology, and astronomy FY2003). Data were collected about race/ethnicity, rank, and gender, and are complete populations, rather than samples. Consequently, they accurately reveal the small number or complete absence of underrepresented groups. Data for all disciplines were obtained in a relatively short time and by a consistent protocol and are therefore comparable across this relatively large number of disciplines. This entire data set became known as the FY2002 Nelson Diversity Surveys (NDS).

The NDS determined demographics of tenured / tenure track faculty in a discipline at pertinent departments of universities, ranked by the National Science Foundation( NSF) according to research funding expenditures in that discipline. The FY2002 data were the first such data published, disaggregated by gender, by race, and by rank, about faculty at 50 research universities in each of 14 science and engineering disciplines. The FY2005 survey was expanded to include 100 departments in each of 15 disciplines (adding earth science). In some cases, slightly fewer than 100 schools were ranked by NSF for a discipline. Data were collected by surveying department chairs, who provided their own department's faculty data, disaggregated by gender, by race/ethnicity, and by rank.

The NDS were funded by Nelson, the Sloan Foundation, the Ford Foundation, the Guggenheim Foundation, NSF, and NIH.
