= Dorothy Thomas (activist) =

American human rights activist

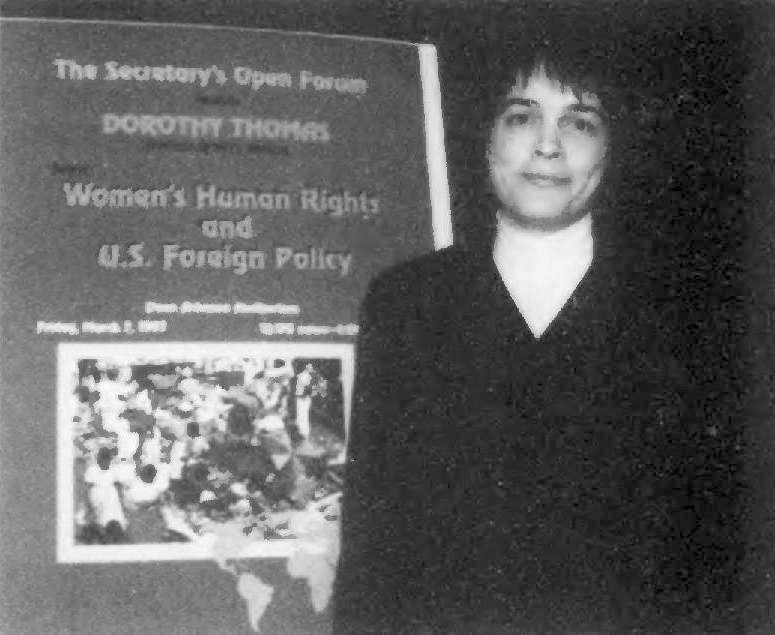
- Thomas in March 1997
- Born: Dorothy Quincy Thomas; 1960 (age 65–66)
- Education: Georgetown University (M.A.)
- Occupation: Human rights activist

Dorothy Quincy Thomas (born 1960) is an American human rights activist. She was a 1998 MacArthur Fellow, and a 1995 Fellow of the Radcliffe Institute for Advanced Study.

== Life ==
She graduated from Georgetown University with an M.A. in 1984. She is senior program advisor to the US Human Rights Fund. She was founding director of the Human Rights Watch, Women's Rights Division, from 1990 to 1998. She was a visiting fellow at the London School of Economics, from 2007 to 2008. She is a research associate at the School of Oriental and African Studies at the University of London. She is a director of the Ms. Foundation for Women.

== Works ==
- "Rape as a War Crime", SAIS Review, Johns Hopkins University Press
- "Domestic Violence as a Human Rights Issue", Human Rights Quarterly, Vol. 15, No. 1 (Feb. 1993)
- Binaifer Nowrojee; Dorothy Q. Thomas; Janet Fleischman, eds. (1996). Shattered lives: sexual violence during the Rwandan genocide and its aftermath. Human Rights Watch. ISBN 978-1-56432-208-1.
- Dorothy Q. Thomas; Sidney Jones, eds. (1993). A Modern form of slavery: trafficking of Burmese women and girls into brothels in Thailand. Human Rights Watch. ISBN 978-1-56432-107-7.
- Robin Kirk; Dorothy Q. Thomas, eds. (1992). Untold terror: violence against women in Peru's armed conflict. Human Rights Watch. ISBN 978-1-56432-093-3. "dorothy q thomas."
- Dorothy Q. Thomas (1996). All too familiar: sexual abuse of women in U.S. state prisons. Human Rights Watch. ISBN 978-1-56432-153-4.
