= St. Helena's Church (Bronx) =

Church building in New York, United States of America

Coordinates: 40°50′4″N 73°51′18″W

The Church of St. Helena
- Interactive map of the The Church of St. Helena area

General information
- Architectural style: Neo-Romanesque
- Location: Unionport, Bronx, New York City, United States of America
- Construction started: 1940
- Completed: 1941
- Client: Roman Catholic Archdiocese of New York

Design and construction
- Architect: Eggers & Higgins

The Church of St. Helena is a parish of the Roman Catholic Church in the Archdiocese of New York. Its parish church is located at the intersection of Olmstead Avenue and Benedict Avenue, Bronx, New York City, in the Unionport neighborhood. It was established in 1940, and the church building was built in the same year and was designed by the prominent architectural firm of Eggers & Higgins.
