= Maryknoll Society =

Roman Catholic society of apostolic life

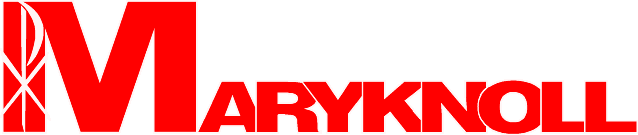
- Abbreviation: M.M.
- Formation: 1911; 115 years ago
- Founders: Thomas Frederick Price; James Anthony Walsh; Mary Joseph Rogers
- Type: Society of Apostolic Life of Pontifical Right (for Men)
- Headquarters: (Fathers and Brothers) P.O. Box 303, Maryknoll, NY 10545-0303
- Members: 317 (268 Priests) (2017)
- Key people: Raymond J. Finch, Superior General, Maryknoll Fathers and Brothers; Ted Miles, Executive Director, Maryknoll Lay Missioners
- Website: www.maryknoll.org

The Maryknoll Society (also known as the Maryknoll Fathers and Brothers and officially as Catholic Foreign Mission Society of America; Latin: Societas de Maryknoll pro missionibus exteris) is a Catholic society of apostolic life for men founded in the United States, who serve as missionaries to the poor and marginalized.

The society was founded in 1911 by Thomas Frederick Price, James Anthony Walsh, and Mary Joseph Rogers. The name Maryknoll comes from the hill outside the Village of Ossining, Westchester County, New York, which houses the headquarters of all three. Members of the societies are usually called Maryknollers.

Maryknollers are sometimes known as the "Marines of the Catholic Church" for their reputation of moving into rough areas, living side-by-side with the indigenous peoples and learning the language. Maryknollers focus on "combating poverty, providing healthcare, building communities and advancing peace and social justice" in the countries they serve and have built numerous orphanages, primary schools and secondary schools. Because of the way in which Maryknollers have especially engaged in social justice, Maryknoll is also sometimes seen as a movement that represents missionary service concerned with positive action for indigenous people. In the mid-20th century, this movement came to be associated with liberation theology.

The Christophers and The Maryknoll Affiliates are both associated with the Maryknoll Movement. Maryknoll is also the current name of the semi-monthly magazine which the Maryknoll Fathers and Brothers publish.

The Maryknoll name is shared by a number of related Catholic organizations, including the Maryknoll Sisters, and the Maryknoll Lay Missioners. The organizations are independent entities with shared history that work closely together in the joint focus of the overseas mission activity of the Catholic Church particularly in East Asia, the United States, Latin America, and Africa.

== History ==
=== Background ===
Prior to 1906, the United States was on a roster of Catholic mission territories compiled by the Vatican. It was part of an era of heavy migrations of European Catholics to the United States and there was a cultural hostility to Roman Catholicism. The establishment of Maryknoll for foreign missions came at a time when the Catholic church was focusing its energies on that anti-Catholic bias within the United States. "Out of the 17,000 Americans serving as Catholic priests at the time, for example, the number serving in foreign missions was 14."

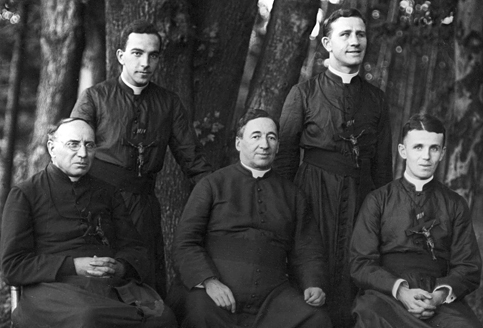
Fathers Thomas F. Price, seated at left, and James A. Walsh, seated at center, co-founders of the Maryknoll Fathers and Brothers, pose for a photo with fellow Maryknoll Fathers James E. Walsh, seated at right, Francis X. Ford, standing at left, and Bernard Meyer, at Maryknoll, N.Y., in 1918.

In 1907, Father James Walsh of Boston began publishing The Field Afar, a mission magazine that would later become Maryknoll. The following year, Mary "Mollie" Josephine Rogers (later Mother Mary Joseph, MM) began helping Walsh with editing, translating and writing.

In 1910, Father Thomas Price was facing the failure of his attempt to begin a Catholic order for domestic mission work in the South. Price was overwhelmed with fundraising on top of his actual mission work and the many responsibilities he had as the order Superior. Price and Walsh had corresponded and met in person that year at a conference in Montreal, Quebec, Canada. The pair immediately began planning a national foreign mission seminary. They were complementary in character; Walsh had a knack for organization and planning things on a grand scale while Price was a "Tarheel" from North Carolina who was personable and charismatic.

=== Foundation of the Maryknoll Fathers and Brothers: 1911–1919 ===
The two received permission to travel to Rome, where Pope Pius X granted their request to found a new society on June 29, 1911.

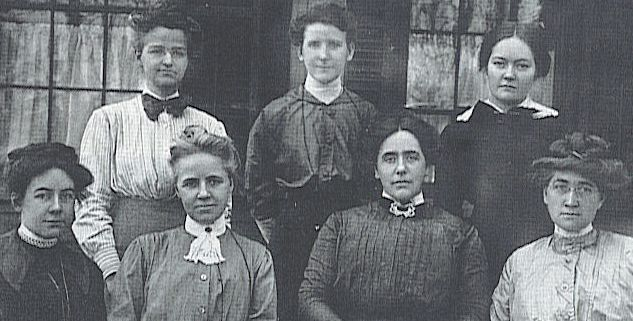
Founder Mary Josephine Rogers, second from right in the front row, with the first 'Teresians' – front row: Mary Louise Wholean, Anna Maria Towle, Sara Sullivan; Back Row: Mary Augustine Dwyer, Nora Shea, Margaret Shea, at Maryknoll in 1913.

Walsh immediately put an ad in The Field Afar: "Youths or young men who feel a strong desire to toil for the souls of heathen people and who are willing to go afar with no hope of earthly recompense and with no guarantee of a return to their native land are encouraged to write." In 1912, The Catholic Foreign Mission Society of America (CFMSA) was launched in a rented property Hawthorne, New York, with a total of six men. Thomas McCann was the first candidate to become a full brother member of the Maryknoll Society on November 21, 1912.

That September, Rogers had relocated to New York to continue work on the magazine. She and five other women "secretaries" began living together at Hawthorne. Rogers emerged as their natural leader and envisioned the women as missioners in their own right and not merely serving in supportive roles to the men.

==== "Mary's Knoll" and Foundation of the Teresians ====
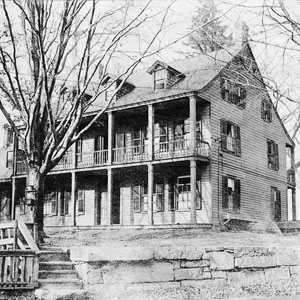
St Teresa's Lodge at Maryknoll, NY, October 15, 1912

Walsh and Price had immediately begun a search for a permanent home for their new society. They contracted for a parcel in Pocantico Hills in July, 1912 but John D. Rockefeller, who owned the property on the other side and did not want a seminary as a neighbor, contested the purchase in court. In August, CFMSA gave up the parcel in return for a financial arrangement. Walsh and Price found a 93-acre hill in Ossining that included three houses and a barn and was now affordable due to the Rockefeller windfall. Wary of another incident of bias, Rogers, dressed as a "Lady from Boston" and accompanied by a lawyer, negotiated the sale. Walsh, dressed as her chauffeur, waited for two hours with the car.

They made the purchase on August 20, 1912, for $44,500, a lower price than what had been offered for the previous parcel. Price dedicated the property to the Blessed Virgin Mary and the name "Mary's Knoll" was coined. The hilltop had two homesteads at a distance from each other, the larger one became the first Seminary and the other was set aside for the "secretaries". A carriage house with quarters was converted into the chapel. The barn was allocated to the brothers and seminary students.

A few weeks later, Walsh asked the "secretaries" how they wished to be organized after the move to Maryknoll. They had been paid $25 a month by Walsh and Price for their work, which Walsh promised to continue, but he now asked them to make a decision if they wanted to continue as laywomen or to transform into a community living under Religious vows. "Do you wish Mollie to direct you, i.e., under my direction?… Write me on this subject…" Each of the women responded affirmatively. Rogers replied to her colleagues, "I want you to know how wholly I belong to you in every hour of the day and night, to serve you, to love you, to watch over you and with you, under the guidance of the Holy Spirit, for of myself I can do nothing."

On October 15, 1912, the women joined Rogers, who had moved to Maryknoll directly after the purchase to cook and help organize. They dubbed their building at Maryknoll "St. Teresa's Lodge". A postcard from a traveling priest in England was addressed to them as the Teresians, and the nickname stuck. The Teresians began studying with the Scranton Sisters of the Immaculate Heart of Mary as they planned to petition for official recognition from Rome. They designed uniforms with the Chi Rho symbol but rarely wore them and, under the advice of a retreat leader, used the Missal for their prayers – a rare occurrence among women at that time.

Maryknoll now had nine men serving as brothers in addition to McCann. They named their building at Maryknoll "St. Michael's" Residence and themselves "The Brothers of St. Michael". Like the Teresians, most brothers spent much of those early years building, maintaining and updating the buildings at Maryknoll.

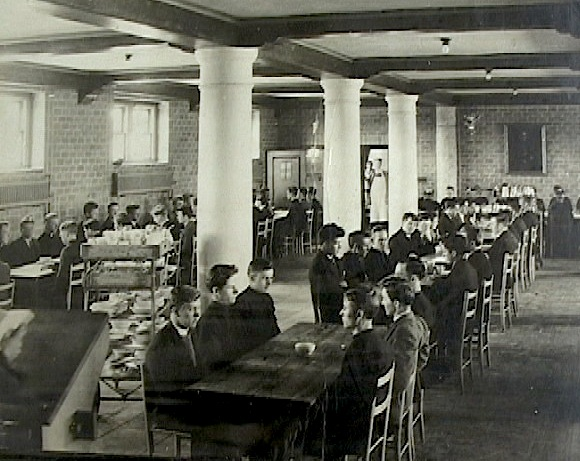
The Venard Seminary of the Maryknoll Society, Scranton, PA circa 1918

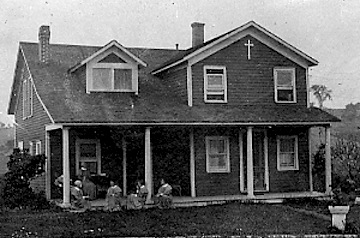
The "Teresians" of Maryknoll assisting at The Venard, PA; July 18, 1918

Michael Hoban, bishop of Scranton, Pennsylvania, invited Maryknoll to establish a school in the city. In 1913, Maryknoll Preparatory Seminary was founded on Clay Avenue and students attended classes at St. Thomas College. Raymond Lane, who made his profession that year in the inaugural class, wrote that the success of the venture was greatly due to residents of Scranton who supported the new seminary with meals, transportation, and donations. In 1915 the lease expired and the students joined the community outside Ossining for a year. In 1916, Walsh, after some difficulty, acquired 179 acres in Clarks Summit, PA and a school set up in an old farm house on the property. It became known as the Venard for Théophane Vénard. Price took charge of the Venard its first year, taking one of the Teresians to assist the new community.

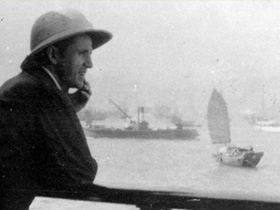
James E. Walsh arrives in China, 1918

==== First and second departures to China ====
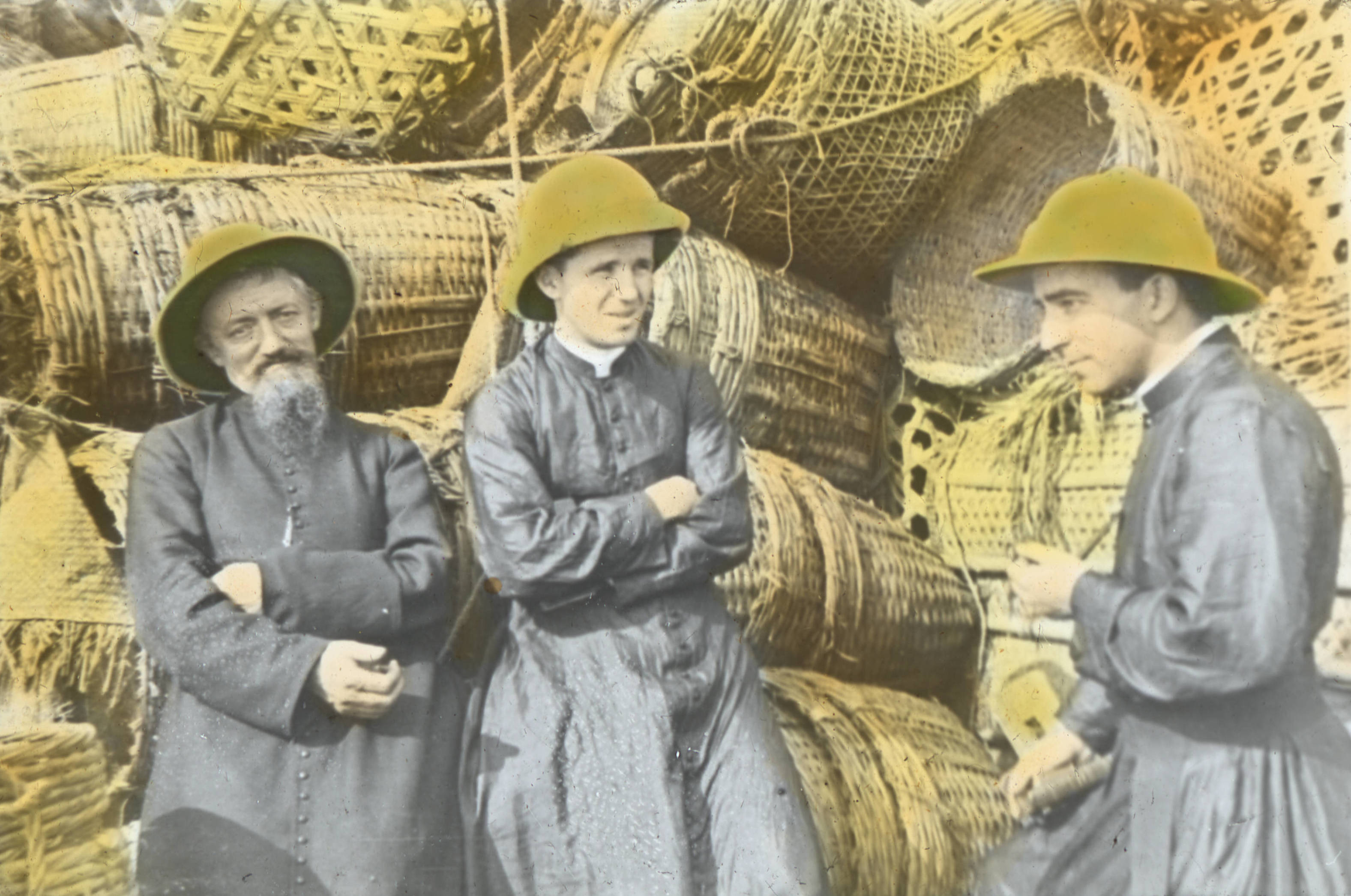
Colorized lantern slide of Maryknoll Fathers James E. Walsh, second from left, and Francis X. Ford, third from left, with Bishop Auguste Gauthier, M.E.P. A large pile of woven baskets provides a backdrop. All three men wear cassocks and pith helmets. ca 1918

World War I ended in 1918 and three Maryknoll priests were ready to make the first Maryknoll mission to China. James Edward Walsh, Francis X. Ford, and Bernard F. Meyer along with Price as Mission Superior departed for China on September 7, 1918. Walsh and Meyer arrived first, Price and Ford some weeks later. Their first stop in Asia was Hong Kong (a British colony at the time), to acclimate briefly with the Paris Foreign Missions Society, which was the predominant Catholic organization in China. From Hong Kong, they went to Yeungkong and started their missionary work in China from there. Although he was only successful at learning a few words in the local dialects, Price quickly set the tone for the mission and those that would follow;

Father Price liked China equally with us, but he had one enthusiasm only... all those precious souls that make up the vast population of common people that we went to help and to save. He gave this emphasis in a way that was very simple and yet highly important, and that was by taking very seriously every little piece of work that was done for the people – the simplest service in the Church, even though it should be attended by only a handful, the insistence on a complete schedule of church services for them just as if he had been in the biggest parish in his own country; the immediate planning for whatever they needed in the matter of religious, educational, medical and other help, even though plans could not be immediately realized, the most patient and courteous reception for every visitor; the scrupulous visits to the outlying villages, even though some of them contained only a few apparently hopeless apostates; and, in general, the placing of himself, his mission and all his energies and resources at the complete service of the people.

In short, Father Price knew why he went to China, and if we did not know it, we soon learned it from his example. I think this emphasis has persisted throughout the development of our missions, and I believe that his short and sacrificial mission career was a providential means in bringing this about.

— James E. Walsh

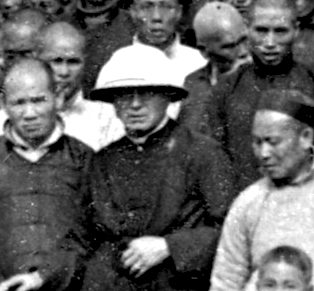
Father Thomas F. Price, co-founder of the Maryknoll Fathers and Brothers, center, was pictured in a 1918 photo in China.

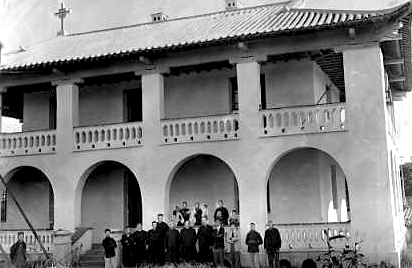
Maryknoll Orphanage at Luoding, China 1921

Daniel Leo McShane led the second Departure Group in 1919. McShanes's first assignment was to assist Meyer. When the Maryknollers arrived, they discovered that Chinese orphanages did not accept infants or sick children. An orphanage was begun in Yeungkong in 1920. McShane was then sent to be the pastor of Luoding and immediately set up an orphanage for abandoned children there, as well, despite local opposition. The abandoned babies were almost all female and traditionally drowned before the Maryknollers built facilities and began offering a few cents for every child. Soon the Yeungkong orphanage was averaging 450 baptisms a year and the Luoding facility close to a thousand.

==== Death of founder Thomas Price: 1919 ====
In August 1919, Price became seriously ill. With no adequate medical facilities in the area, he was transported to St. Paul's Hospital, Hong Kong. It was a long and arduous journey from Yeungkong by primitive means. Price was admitted on August 19, 1919 and underwent an operation in early September. The treatment was too late and Price died as a result of a burst appendix on September 12, 1919. His body was buried in the priests' plot in St. Michael's Cemetery in Happy Valley, Hong Kong. In 1936, his body was exhumed and transferred to the cemetery at Maryknoll, New York. James E Walsh was named Superior of the mission following Price's death.

=== Maryknolls Today ===
As of 2008, there were over 475 Maryknoll priests and brothers serving in countries around the world, principally in Africa, Asia and Latin America. Throughout their history, especially in the first half of the 20th century, Maryknoll missioners played a large role in the Catholic Church in East Asia where some missioners still work. Maryknoll also has extensive connections with many Latin American countries, where it has long worked to help alleviate poverty and bring constructive changes to the life of Latin America's poor.

== Maryknoll Seminary Building ==
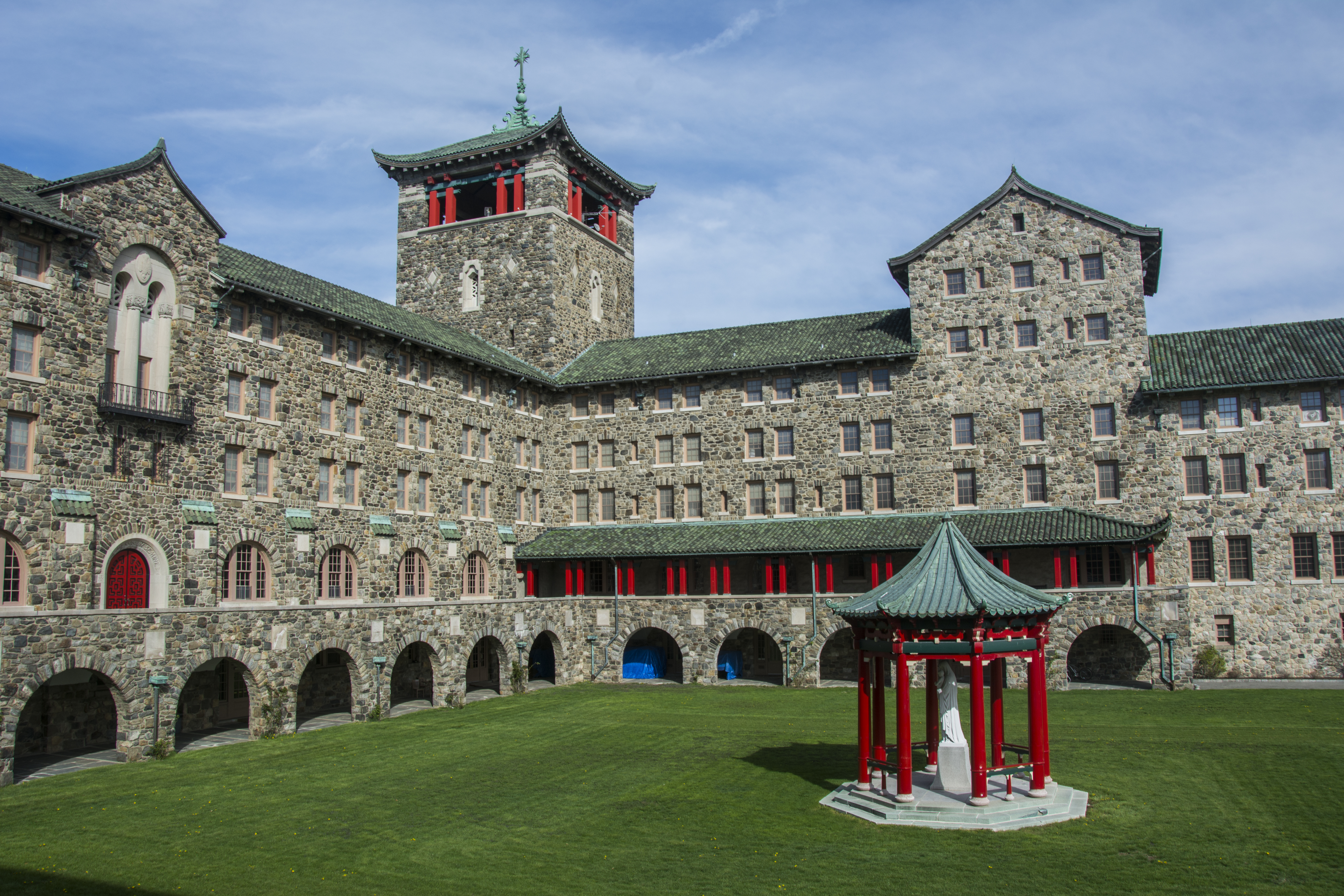
The Asian-inspired fieldstone seminary at Maryknoll, a hill on the outskirts of Ossining, N.Y. Designed by Maginnis & Walsh.

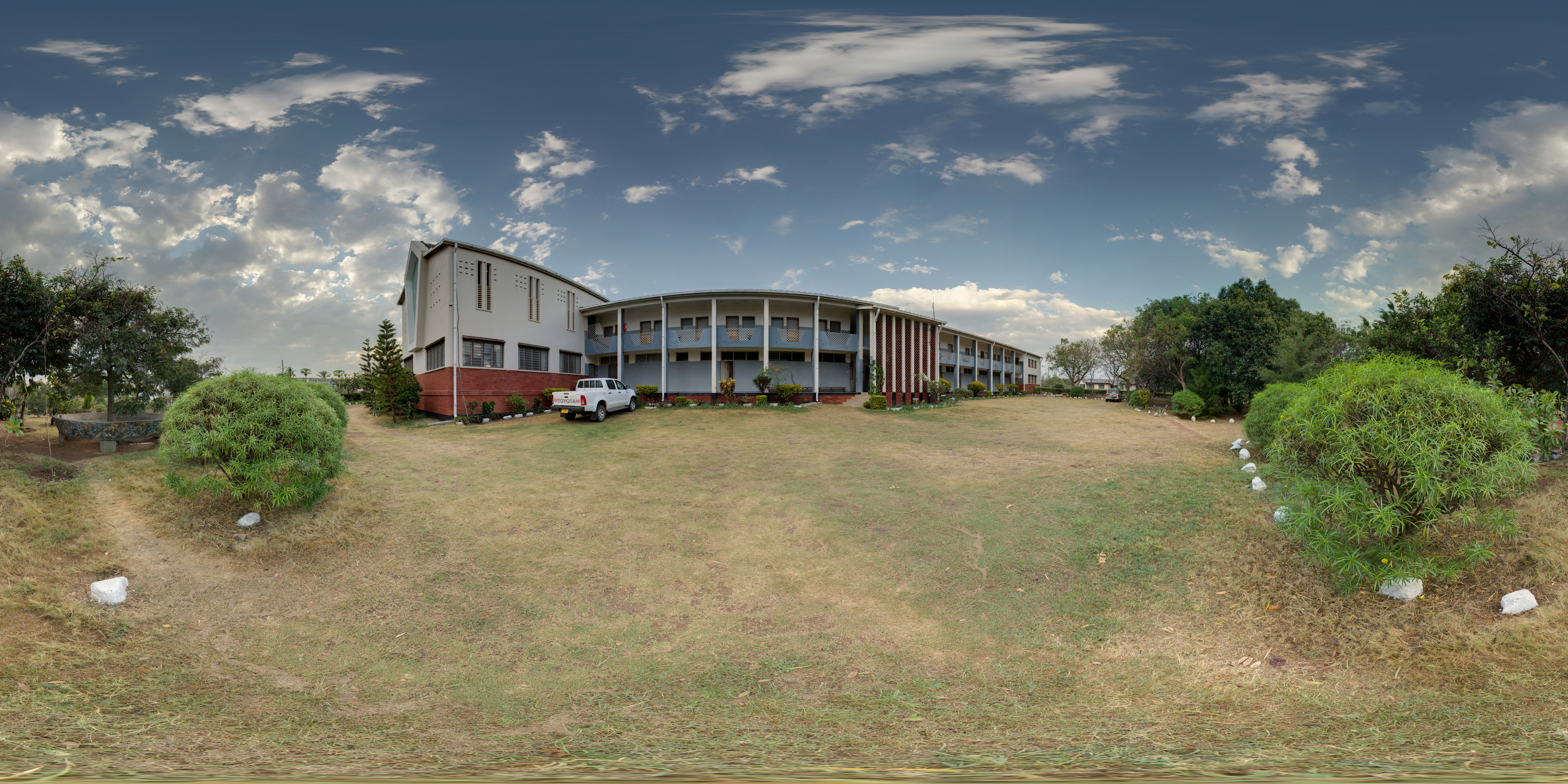
Panorama of a missionary station built by Maryknoll Fathers (Makoko, Tanzania)

The Maryknoll Seminary Building is located in Ossining, Westchester County, New York. The building currently houses the headquarters of Maryknoll missions. The building has distinctive design, specifically with pagodas built into its architecture, to honor its founding purpose as a mission order to the Far East.

== Martyrs ==
- Francis Xavier Ford, Maryknoll martyr. Fr. Ford was one of the first four Maryknollers to arrive in China in 1918 and died in a Canton prison in 1953. A primary school named Bishop Ford Memorial School was founded by the Maryknoll Fathers in Hong Kong in 1952. The school is now run by the Catholic Diocese of Hong Kong Bishop Ford Central Catholic High School in Brooklyn, New York was founded in 1962 and named in his honor, but closed in 2014.

== Other notable Maryknollers ==
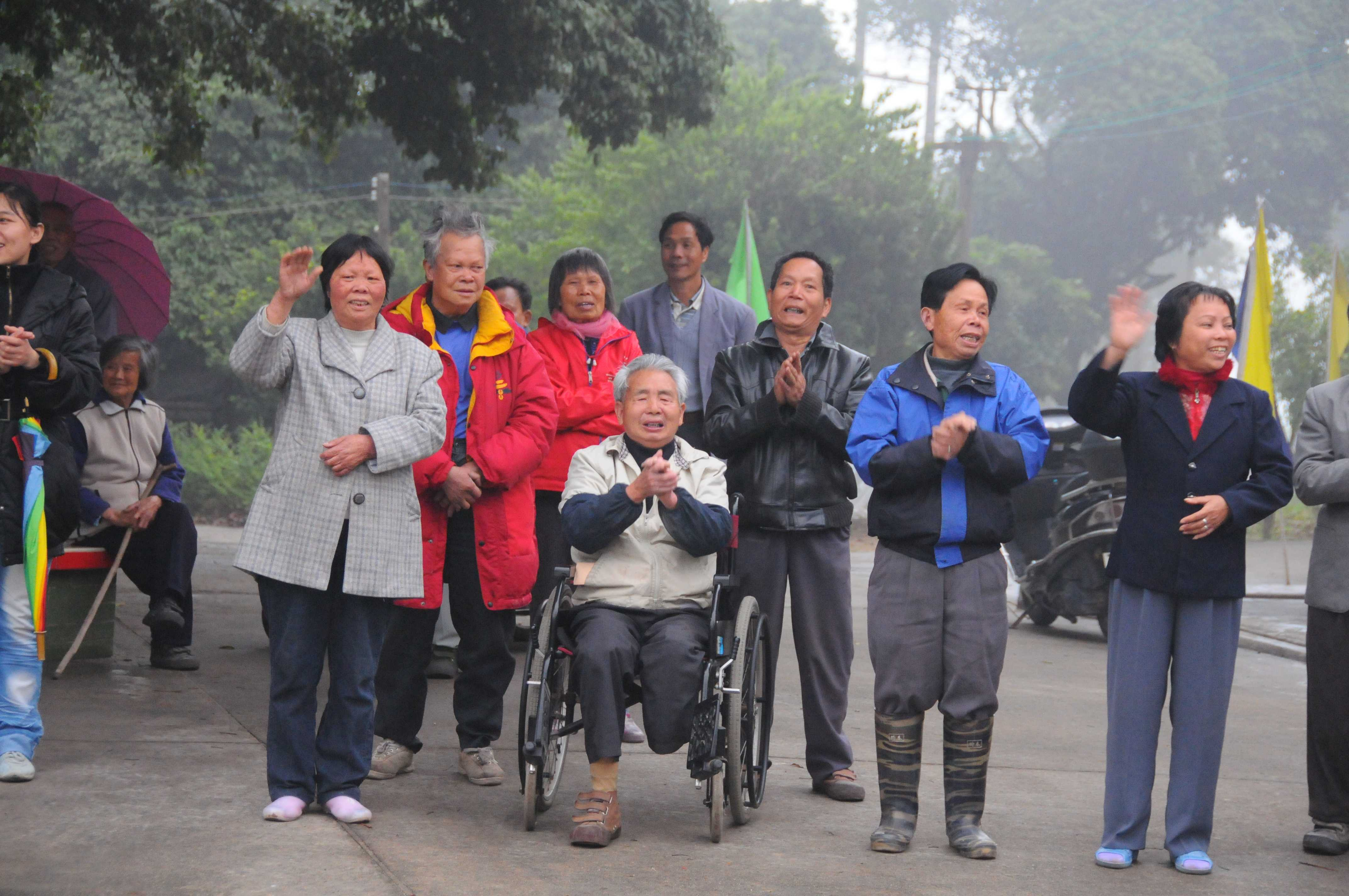
Residents at Gate of Heaven Leprosarium in Kongmoon 厓門倉山 Many of the buildings there erected by Bro Albert Staubli are still standing today. Photo taken on 2011 March 20.

- Maryknoll Seminary alumni
- Roy Bourgeois was ordained to the priesthood in the Maryknoll Fathers and Brothers in 1972, after which he worked with the poor in Bolivia until 1975. An outspoken critic of US foreign policy in Latin America, he founded the non-profit human rights organization, School of the Americas Watch (SOA Watch) in 1990. In 2005 he was awarded the Thomas Merton Award for his work. Following his participation in a women's ordination-to-the-priesthood ceremony in August 2008, he was warned of possible excommunication latae sententiae, marking the beginning of a four-year-long period of discussion and negotiation between Bourgeois and the Church, through the Maryknoll Society. Finally, on November 19, 2012, it was announced that Bourgeois had been officially canonically dismissed from both the Maryknoll Society, and the Roman Catholic priesthood, effective October 4, 2012.
- Everett Francis Briggs, Maryknoll missionary, studied the history of the Monongah Mining Disaster of December 6, 1907 described as "the worst mining disaster in American History". After discovering there was no memorial, he sought to ensure that the victims of the tragedy were not forgotten.
- Miguel d'Escoto Brockmann, Foreign Minister of Nicaragua in the Sandinista government. Pope John Paul refused to meet him during his papal visit to the country on 4 March 1983, as he remained in that government contrary to Church discipline.
- Patrick Joseph Byrne, Apostolic Delegate to Korea from 1949 to 1950 who died in the custody of the Communists in Korea.
- Fr. Vincent R. Capodanno former Maryknoll missionary, Servant of God, and Medal of Honor winner during the Viet Nam War as a Navy Chaplain attached to the US Marines. He did his missionary work in Taiwan.
- Fr. Robert W. Greene, served in China; placed under house arrest on Oct. 15, 1950; banished from China and marched under guard to Hong Kong on Apr. 13, 1952. Later authored best-selling novel "Calvary in China" about his work and incarceration, published in 1953.
- Fr. Joseph G. Healey serves in Kenya. He is noted for his innovative use of proverbs and other local verbal arts in ministry.
- James Keller, founder of The Christophers.
- Thomas Melville, a former Maryknoll priest, Catholic activist, one of the nine Catholic activists of Catonsville Nine
- Bishop Adolph John Paschang, Maryknoll missionary. A primary school named Bishop Paschang Memorial School was set up by Fr. John M. Mcloughlin, M.M. in Hong Kong in 1969. The school is still run by the Maryknoll Fathers in Hong Kong
- Thomas Frederick Price, one of the two Maryknoll founders. Fr Price was one of the first four Maryknollers to arrive in China in 1918. Price Memorial Catholic Primary School was founded in Hong Kong for his labour in missionary work.
- Bishop James E. Walsh, Maryknoll missionary. Fr James Edward Walsh was one of the first four Maryknollers to arrive in China in 1918. Consecrated bishop of Kongmoon in 1927, he was imprisoned in 1959 and released in 1970 due to the improving US-China relationship. He became the last American missionary to be released by the Communist Chinese government. A primary school named Bishop Walsh Primary School was set up by the Maryknoll Fathers in Hong Kong in 1963. The school is now run by the Catholic Diocese of Hong Kong

An ex-Maryknoll priest, now deceased, recently was reported to have sexually abused a young boy for about eight years during the 1960s when he was assigned to parishes in Westchester County. This filing was reported in the June 13, 2019 issue of The Journal News.

Another former Maryknoll priest, also deceased, has been cited for child sex abuse allegations in the Virginia Diocese of Richmond. He is one of six clergy recently added to the list priests from the diocese cited for 'credible and substantiated' allegations of sexual abuse against a minor. The announcement was made during June 2019.

A deceased Maryknoll priest, was accused of abuse in a claim filed during 2019 by the son of lay missioners who lived close to the Maryknoll campus in Ossining, New York. The family ate their meals at the Maryknoll dining room. The claim was reported in the January 13, 2020 issue of The Journal News.

== Schools in Hong Kong ==
Several notable schools in Hong Kong were founded by Maryknollers; and several are still run by them.

=== Founded by the Maryknollers ===
- Bishop Ford Memorial School, a co-educational primary school. This is the first ever school founded by the Maryknoll Fathers in Hong Kong after the Second World War. It was founded in 1952 after the Maryknoller, Fr. Francis Xavier Ford for his mission in China. This school is now managed by the Catholic Diocese of Hong Kong,
- Kwun Tong Maryknoll College, a secondary school for boys, now managed by the Catholic Diocese of Hong Kong,
- Bishop Walsh Primary School, a co-educational primary school. This school was founded in 1963 after the Maryknoller, Bishop James Edward Walsh, who had suffered a lot for his mission in China. This school is now managed by the Catholic Diocese of Hong Kong,
- Pope Pius XII Primary School, a co-educational primary school in Hong Kong, founded in 1953, closed in 1979. Her legacy is inherited by Chai Wan Kok Catholic Primary School and Sham Tseng Catholic Primary School, both now run by the Roman Catholic Diocese of Hong Kong)
- St. Patrick's School, a co-educational primary school, now managed by the Catholic Diocese of Hong Kong,
- St. Patrick's Catholic Primary School (Po Kong Village Road), formerly PM section of St Patrick's School, also a co-educational primary school, now managed by the Catholic Diocese of Hong Kong
- Marymount Secondary School initially known as the Holy Spirit School, then the Maryknoll Sisters' School, a secondary school for girls founded in 1927. This is the very second school set up by Maryknollers in Hong Kong.
- Marymount Primary School, a primary school for girls,
- Maryknoll Convent School, primary and secondary school for girls.

The last three schools were in fact founded by the Maryknoll Sisters. Maryknoll Convent School is still managed by them in Hong Kong. However, sponsorship of the two Marymount schools was transferred to Christian Life Community. Nevertheless, these three schools are frequently viewed as members of the Maryknoll family in Hong Kong.

(The first school managed by the Maryknollers in Hong Kong was called St. Louis Industrial School, between 1921 and 1927, run by Fr Raymond Lane and Brother Albert Staubli. Management of the school was handed over to the Salesians in 1927 and later renamed as St Louis School. Likewise, the first school founded by the Maryknollers in China was called St. Thomas School, a primary school in Yangjiang (previously known as Yeungkong) with the first graduation held in July 1923. The second school founded by the Maryknollers in China was called Sacred Heart School, also a primary school, set up by Fr Bernard F. Meyer in Gaozhou (previously known as Kochow), with inauguration held on 5 October 1923. and first graduation in 1926 Fr Adolph John Paschang once served in this Sacred Heart School in Gaozhou.)

=== Still run by Maryknoll Fathers and Brothers ===
- Maryknoll Secondary School, formerly known as Maryknoll Technical Secondary School, a co-educational secondary school,
- Maryknoll College (Senior Form), formerly known as Maryknoll Technical Secondary Evening School, a private co-educational evening school, senior forms only,
- Maryknoll Fathers' School secondary section, a co-educational secondary school,
- Maryknoll Fathers' School (Primary Section), a co-educational primary school,
- Bishop Paschang Catholic School, formerly known as Bishop Paschang Memorial School, a co-educational primary school. This school was founded after the late Maryknoller, Bishop Adolph John Paschang, who had suffered a lot for his missionary work in China.

== See also ==
- Catholic Church in China
- Catholic Church in Japan
- Catholic Church in Korea
- Consecrated life
- Dalian Catholic Church
- Institute of consecrated life
- Roman Catholic Diocese of Jiangmen
- Secular institute
- Maryknoll House (Stanley)
