= Maryknoll (disambiguation) =

Maryknoll is a Catholic non-profit mission movement. Maryknoll may also refer to:

== Organizations ==
- Maryknoll Lay Missioners, a Roman Catholic organization
- Maryknoll Sisters, a Catholic missionary order
- Maryknoll Society, a Roman Catholic society

== Schools ==
- Kwun Tong Maryknoll College, Hong Kong
- Maryknoll Academy, a former name of Maryhill College
- Maryknoll College, a former name of Miriam College
- Maryknoll College of Panabo, Davao del Norte, Philippines
- Maryknoll Convent School, Hong Kong
- Maryknoll Fathers' School, Hong Kong
- Maryknoll School, Hawaii, United States

== Places ==
- Maryknoll House (Stanley), a building in Hong Kong
- Maryknoll, Victoria, Australia
- Our Lady of Maryknoll Hospital, Hong Kong
