= Bernard F. Meyer =

Reverend Bernard Francis Meyer, M.M.
- Prefect Apostolic of Wuzhou
- Church: Catholic Church
- Appointed: December 10, 1934
- Term ended: July 20, 1939

Orders
- Ordination: February 12, 1916 by Austin Dowling

Personal details
- Born: June 16, 1891 Brooklyn, Iowa
- Died: May 8, 1975 (aged 83) North Tarrytown, New York

Bernard Francis Meyer, M.M. (June 16, 1891 – May 8, 1975) was an American Catholic missionary. As a member of the Catholic Foreign Mission Society of America (Maryknoll), he was assigned to missions in China. He served as the Prefect Apostolic of Wuzhou from 1934 to 1939.

== Early life and education ==
Born in Brooklyn, Iowa, Bernard Meyer's family moved to Stuart, Iowa, where he was educated in the local public schools. After working on the family farm he attended St. Ambrose College in Davenport, Iowa, and St. Mary's Seminary in Baltimore. While he was a student at St. Mary's he wrote to Bishop James Walsh and inquired about Maryknoll. He professed religious vows in 1914 and was ordained a priest on February 12, 1916, by Bishop Austin Dowling of Des Moines.

== Priesthood ==
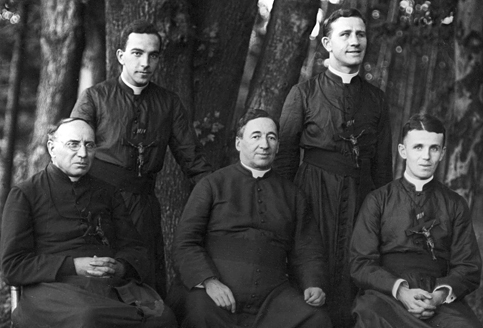
From left to right, seated: Fr Thomas Frederick Price, Fr James Anthony Walsh and Fr James Edward Walsh; standing Fr Francis Xavier Ford and Fr Bernard Meyer in 1918.

After ordination Meyer was appointed to the minor seminary faculty at Venard. The following year he was assigned as one of the first Maryknoll missionaries to South China. He was a delegate to Maryknoll's first General Chapter in 1929 after which he returned to Wuzhou (Wuchow). He was named the superior of the mission on October 30, 1931. On December 10, 1934 Pope Pius XI appointed Meyer as the Prefect Apostolic of Wuzhou. He suffered health problems and he resigned his position on July 20, 1939. As World War II broke out, Meyer was living in Hong Kong and he was interned by the Japanese. He was offered repatriation, but instead chose to take care of the medical and spiritual needs of his fellow prisoners. He returned to the United States as a delegate to the Third General Chapter in 1946. Meyer returned to Guangdong (Canton), but was exiled from China by the Communists in 1950.

Bishop Vincent Waters of the Diocese of Raleigh invited Meyer to promote Catholic Action in his diocese. Being located in the Southern United States also provided relief from the acute rheumatism he suffered from.

== Later life and death ==
Meyer's health declined during the last ten years of his life. He moved into the St. Teresa Residence when it opened in 1968. He died on May 8, 1975, at Phelps Memorial Hospital in North Tarrytown, New York, at the age of 83. Bishop John W. Comber celebrated his funeral on May 12 in the Maryknoll Chapel.

== Contribution to Cantonese Learning ==
Together with Theodore F Wempe, he compiled the Student's Cantonese English Dictionary published in 1934. Although some refer to a 'Meyer-Wempe System', there was nothing new in it as their entire schema followed the system devised in the last decade of the 19th century known as Standard Romanization (SR), which, in turn, was almost identical to John Chalmers' system of 1870.
