= Observations in the Orient =

1919 travel book by James Anthony Walsh

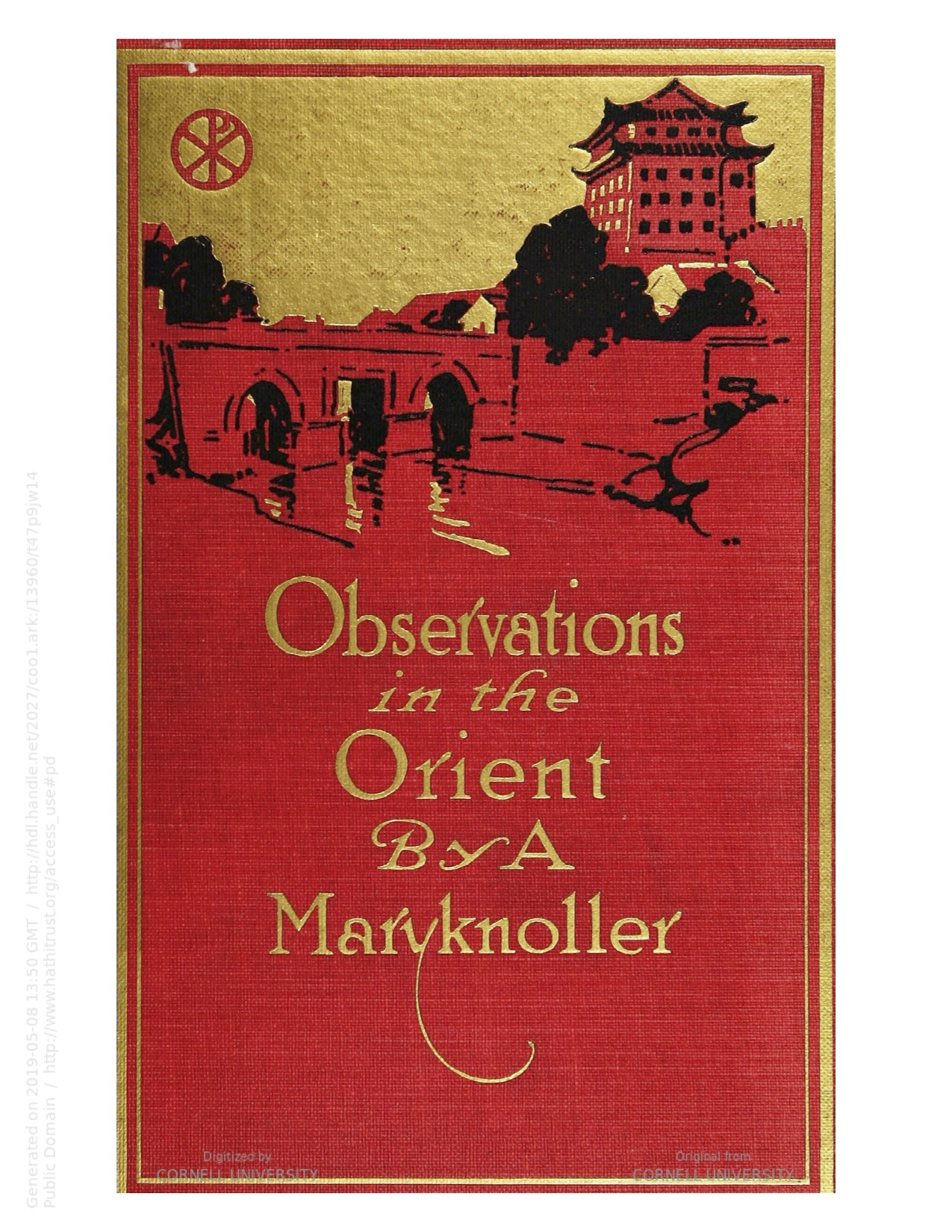
- Author: James Anthony Walsh
- Genre: Travel literature, account
- Publisher: Catholic Foreign Mission Society of America
- Publication date: 1919
- Publication place: US
- Media type: Book

Observations in the Orient: The Account of a Journey to Catholic Mission Fields in Japan, Korea, Manchuria, China, Indo-China, and the Philippines is the travel book of James Anthony Walsh on his travels through Asia between fall 1917 and spring 1918. Walsh was a bishop and co-founder of the Maryknoll Fathers and Brothers. The book was published in 1919 by the Catholic Foreign Mission Society of America in Ossining, New York.

Observations in the Orient is originally 323 pages long and contains twenty chapters excluding the preface. It also includes 104 black-and-white photographs.

== Bibliographical information ==
=== Full citation ===
Walsh, James Anthony (1919). Observations in the Orient: The Account of a Journey to Catholic Mission Fields in Japan, Korea, Manchuria, China, Indo-China, and the Philippines. Ossining, New York: Catholic Foreign Mission Society of America.

=== Paratext ===
==== Physical aspects ====
The original cover of Observations in the Orient is red with gold highlights and black detailing. It contains an illustration that appears to depict a landscape in East Asia. Half of the cover is taken up by this illustration. The other half has "Observations in the Orient By a Maryknoller" written in gold script. Both the illustrations and text are framed by a gold border. The symbol in the top left corner is the Maryknoll symbol.

The spine of the book is also red. From top to bottom, the spine reads "Observations in the Orient," "Walsh," and "C.F.M.S.A. Maryknoll." It is also adorned with a decorative cross. The back of the book is bare of any embellishment.

The text within the book is printed on plain paper while the photographs are printed on sub-glossy paper. Additionally, the first initial of every chapter is illustrated.

The front matter of the book consists of (in order) a black-and-white picture of Kwangtung, China, an inside front cover with the title, author and publisher, a copyright page, dedication page, preface, a table of contents, and a list of illustrations. The book also originally comes with a "reader's map" that traces Walsh's route.

==== Dedication ====
Observations in the Orient is dedicated to John Cardinal Farley. Walsh cites Farley as: Prince of the Church, Beloved of his flock, patron of all good works, for God and Country, friend of the missions, and father to Maryknoll.

==== Preface ====
Walsh's preface gives an explanation and justification for writing Observations in the Orient. Walsh first notes his growing interest in recording the Orient, citing The Field Afar and his own early experiences in China as major sources of inspiration. Walsh writes that publishing letters on the Orient in book form can help fill the gap of English literature on Foreign Missions.

His hope is to enlighten thousands of Catholic Americans on the growing mission to evangelize the heathen world. Walsh pushes for awareness of Catholic foreign missions from "the great Republic," America. The development of missionary zeal and spirit in the church of America is how he believes the Holy Father's Apostolic army can be sustained and strengthened. Walsh ends the preface by expressing his hope for the Maryknoll Society to continue growing in prestige and progress.

=== Holdings ===
Original copies of the book are rare. Only a select few of universities and libraries around the world hold a copy. European universities and libraries tend to have Observations in the Orient in book form while the United States exclusively has the book in microforms. The University of Toronto and Duke University are the only two universities whose libraries hold multiple copies.

Books
Place	Location	Copies held
Maastricht University Inner City Library (Jesuit collection)	Maastricht, The Netherlands	1
University of Würzburg Library	Würzburg, Germany	1
Berlin State Library	Berlin, Germany	1
National and University Library	Strasbourg, France	1
International Research Center for Japanese Studies	Kyoto, Japan	1
University of Toronto Libraries	Toronto, Canada	3

Mircoforms
Place	Location	Copies held
Boston University School of Theology Library	Boston, MA, US	1
Yale University Sterling Memorial Library	New Haven, CT, US	1
Cornell University Library	Ithaca, NY, US	1
Princeton Theological Seminary	Princeton, NJ, US	1
Duke University Libraries	Durham, NC, US	2
Concordia Theological Seminary (CTSFW Library)	Fort Wayne, IN, US	1
University of Manitoba	Winnipeg, Canada	1
Asbury Theological Seminary (B.L. Fisher Library)	Wilmore, KY, US	1
Colombia Theological Seminary (JBC Library)	Decatur, GA, US	1
University of Washington Libraries	Seattle, WA, US	1
Southwest Baptist Seminary (Roberts Library)	Fort Worth, TX, US	1
San Diego Christian & Southern California Seminary Library	California, CA, US	1
University of Hong Kong Libraries	Hong Kong	1

== Historical context ==
James A. Walsh was the co-founder of the Maryknoll Fathers and Brothers and a prominent figure for Catholic missions to Asia during the early twentieth century. Walsh was an important missionary for the Church of America. He attended Boston College High School where he garnered recognition and developed his journalism skills. Later, he studied at Boston College, Harvard College, and St. John's seminary. In 1892, Walsh was ordained as a priest. He was then appointed as director of the Society for the Propagation of the Faith a few years later in 1903.

The Society was important for it was established in the hopes of generated support for foreign missions. Before, the American Catholic Church was more focused on home missions, more concerned with Native Americans, African-Americans, immigrants, and the rural poor than overseas peoples. In contrast, American Protestants relished in foreign missions. Walsh, as a new director, had to both compete with American Protestant missionaries and garner support for Catholic missions overseas. Walsh did two major things to accomplish this: “launch a campaign to educate clergy” and publish The Field Afar, which would become the official Maryknoll magazine.

The campaign's goal was to "educate future missionaries through closely supervised programs." Missionaries were trained for six years on philosophy and dogmatic and moral theology. They were shown charitable accounts, evangelistic activities, and struggles with "pagan" China. Walsh hoped to foster a deep spiritual commitment through this education. Little was devoted to the study of China's language, history, and political affairs. Walsh "was drawn to China because he judged it to be the mission field in which Maryknoll efforts could rival those of American Protestant missions, arouse the competitive spirit of American Catholics, and generate mission vocations and financial contributions." The ever-increasing number of Catholic missionaries journeying to China combined with their lack of cultural, political, and linguistic knowledge on the nation left them with only missionary zeal and a spirit of self-sacrifice.

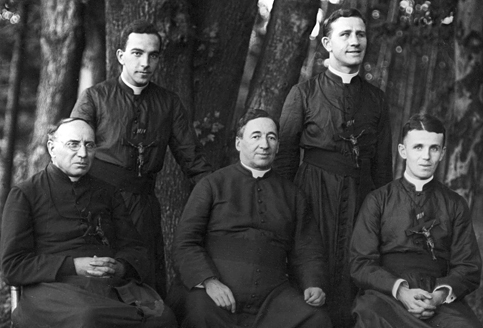
Co-founders of the Maryknoll Father and Brothers, Thomas F. Price seated on the bottom left and James A. Walsh seated at the center.

The Field Afar was also used to gain support. First published in 1907, The Field Afar was a bimonthly publication detailing the foreign missions of the Catholic Church. The twenty-five to thirty page issue contained information ranging from the Maryknoll's activities in the United States to news on the world missionary movement to even selections from Maryknoll missionaries’ diaries. Its overall purpose was to promote missionary spirit, cement Catholic missionaries’ presences in East Asia, challenge Protestant missions, and attract monetary support. The magazine was also crucial for the emergence of foreign missions for it informed the public about the activities and needs of the Maryknoll missioners. Walsh modeled the magazine after another successful magazine, named Life, in an effort to make it a more interesting read for the public (as opposed to the "dry" Annals). Four main themes circulated by the magazine are highlighted by Jean-Paul Wiest: “China was a ‘great country and a great people,’ China was ‘a country ready for Christianity,’ works of charity would reach and convert non-Christian Chinese, and their faith was a wonder to behold." The magazine increased in popularity over the course of the 1920s.

Walsh's increasing involvement and interest in foreign missions eventually lead to the co-founding of the Maryknolls with Thomas F. Price in 1911, also known as the Catholic Foreign Mission Society of America. Prior to its founding, Walsh and Price traveled to Rome to receive the permission and blessing of Pope Pius X to begin their seminary. Their goal was to spread the word of Christ through foreign missions. The society embodied some of the core Progressive Era values of the time. These values included "an optimism about American and its ‘place in the world, ‘activism,’ (situations did not improve on their own), a positive interpretation of the increasing sense of globalness...respect for the individual, adaptability, and an appreciation of democracy." The Maryknolls saw these values as uniquely American. One bishop summarizes the Maryknoll attitude, supposing: “not that we have not the ‘foreigners at our door and within our gate,’ but that we might take advantage of our Country's prestige in foreign lands to spread the Gospel." The Maryknolls also held certain anti-modernist beliefs.

Walsh's response to the tendencies of modernism shaped his "American" approach to missions overseas. He believed that a certain "vital energy" was lost in industrialization and over-civilization; assembly lines and factories separated workers from their products that left little satisfaction. There was a suspicion toward urban luxury and comfort achieved by the middle and upper class. Walsh wanted to avoid the idea of the "teacup" clergyman, who represented all the luxury and daintiness found in American civilization, and aimed to preserve "true substance" in religion. The major symbol of this perspective was the "apostolic martyr, a person who went the ‘whole way into the wilderness,’ even to the point of spilling blood for belief in Christ."

From 1918 until his death in 1936, Walsh served as Superior general of the Maryknoll Fathers and Brothers. During this time, he traveled the world to observe mission work, attended to the administration of the Maryknolls, and discussed life in mission. By the end of his life, Walsh wrote five books along with numerous The Field Afar issues, one book of which was Observations in the Orient. The book is an account of his travels throughout primarily East Asia, but also Indo-China and the Philippines.

Walsh gives five reasons (which can be found in the preface) for writing Observations in the Orient. Firstly, he has a growing interest in the Orient thanks to his own early experiences in China and The Field Afar. Secondly, it can help fill the gap of English literature on Catholic foreign missions. Thirdly, he wants to enlighten Catholic Americans on the growing missionary work. Fourthly, to raise awareness of Catholic foreign missions from America. Lastly, he wishes to sustain and strengthen Catholic missionaries.

== Contents ==
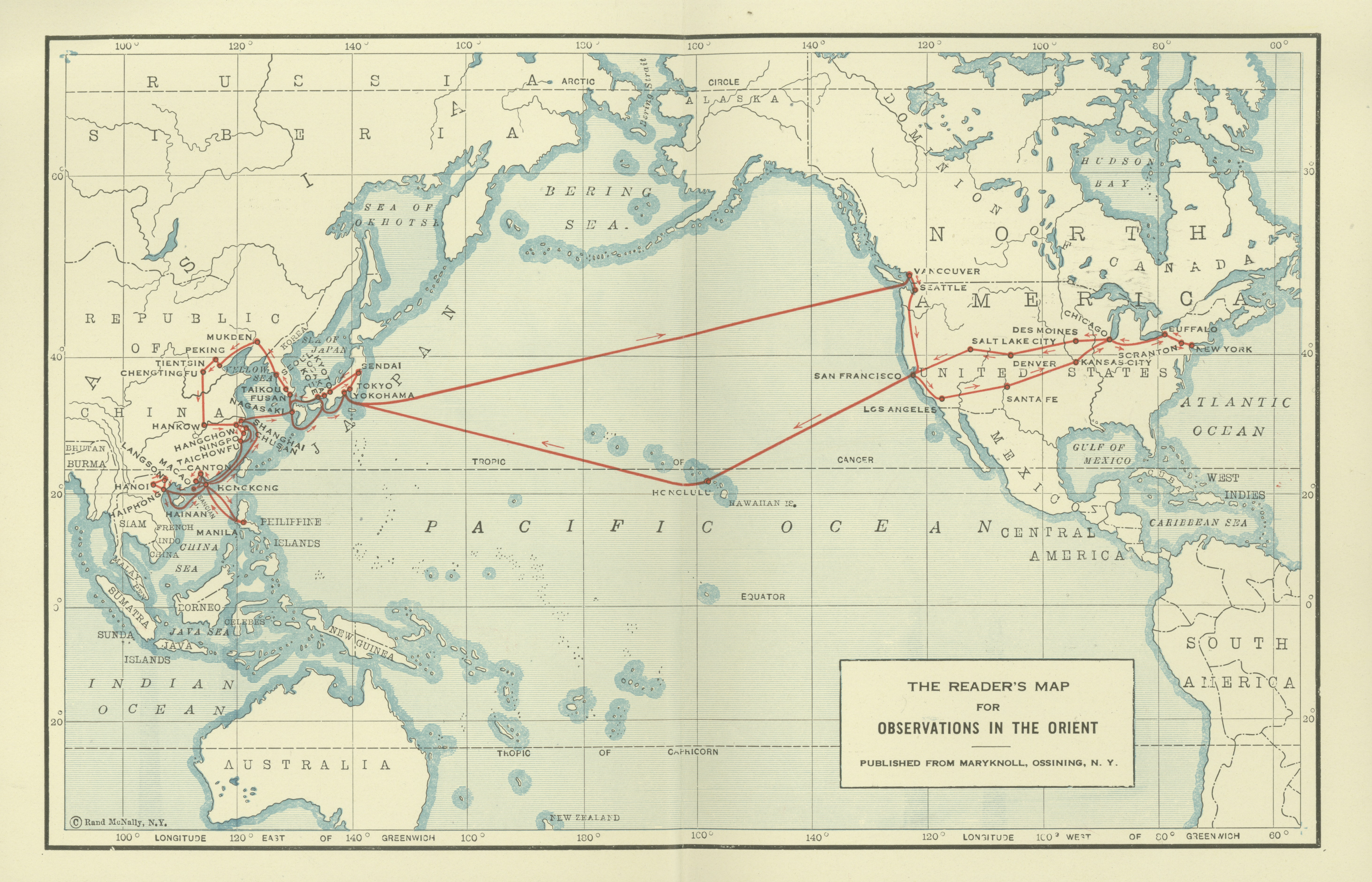
Readers map provided by James Anthony Walsh in Observations in the Orient

The account of Walsh's journey through Asia is in chronological order in Observations in the Orient. He begins in New York City and travels across the United States, ending on the West Coast. He then takes a Japanese ship to Japan. From there, he goes briefly to Korea and Manchuria then spends a long while traveling throughout China. He ends in Indo-China after making a quick trip to the Philippines. The last chapter of his book is dedicated to impressions and takeaways he has gathered by the end of his travels. These impressions are both of the people he encounters as well as the accomplishments of the Catholic mission.

=== United States and Pacific ===
Walsh decided to go on the journey to get a glimpse of Catholic missions in Asia as well as scout out the missions field for the Maryknolls. His journey began in New York city in September 1917. From New York, he travels through the American cities of Scranton, Buffalo, Chicago, Des Moines, Denver, Salt Lake City, and San Francisco. The first chapter of Walsh's book is dedicated to the observations and feelings he had while making his westward journey. Many of the observations are on people, the landscape, and the Catholic faith. There are six photographs in this chapter.

Walsh leaves San Francisco on September 15 on the Japanese steamer, Tenyo Maru. There are missionaries (both from America and Europe), Chinese, and Japanese. He speaks to some English speaking Asians and non-Asians while on board. The boat stops in Hawaii and Walsh spends some time there. A Korean joins after their stop in Honolulu, Hawaii.

=== Japan ===
Walsh docks on the shores of Yokohama, Japan on October 3, 1917. He travels to Tokyo, Sendai, Kyoto, Osaka, Kobe, Yokohama, Fukushima, Shimonseki, Moji, Urakami, and Nagasaki during his journey. While in Japan, he mets many representatives of the church who hail from all over the world. He also is able to scout out future Maryknoller fields in Japan and get a taste for what life if like there for them.

Throughout his stay in Japan, Walsh reports on the progress of the Catholic missions. In Tokyo, he writes that he misses some necessities from home, such as a shaving mirror. At one point, he visits the Jesuit College within Tokyo. Walsh notes that he is not in the Christian land although the success of the missions and the fellow missionaries and clergy he met may suggest otherwise.

In Niko, Walsh observes the local "pagan" priests. He observes that there are no Catholic priest or church in the city. He does visit a temple during his stay and notices its pilgrims. Walsh travels to Sendai next. The missions in the city are predominately Protestant. There are only three Catholic churches. He also witnesses a "pagan festival." Fukushima is the next destination after a quick stop to Yokohama.

At Fukushima, Walsh encounters many accomplishments of the missions. He also encounters various missionaries during his stay. After, he travels to Kyoto through Yokohama by train. On his way he comments on the countryside and how "things seem small in this country." He arrived at Kyoto earlier than expected, surprising the priest he will be staying with. He visits where the Bishop of the city lives and another flourishing school. Walsh even meets A Field Afar subscriber in the next city, Kobe. He travels through Shimonseki and Moji before reaching Nagasaki. He makes a quick trip to Urakami during his stay in Nagasaki. Walsh continues to observe the Catholic mission's achievements throughout his journey. He departs to Korea via a steamer from Moji.

=== Korea and Manchuria ===
Only a single chapter is dedicated to each Korea and Manchuria. Walsh first starts his chapter on Korea by contrasting his easy entrance to the "Hermit kingdom" with those before him. He writes of at the "untold sufferings" of the bishops, priests, and natives who shed their blood for Christ on Korean soil. He regrets the very strict Japanese laws toward photography but is still able to take a few. Walsh is able to find two missionaries and details their backstories. One missionary came due to the flock of Japanese converging upon Korea, some of which were Catholic. Little is said about the other missionary aside that he arrived by bike from the neighboring village. Walsh comments on the landscape between Fusan and Taikou, noting and describing the houses the passed especially.

At Taikou, Walsh visits the Catholic Mission of Taikou where he encounters numerous peoples. He notes the Protestant stronghold near the Catholic building as well but seems to appreciate the Catholic Mission's accomplishment. The lack of "modern amenities" even within the building is described. Walsh visits a seminary where he meets young Koreans studying in classrooms. During his stay in Taikou, he also met four Korean lords and nuns in the midst of taking care of a group of orphans. From there, the next destination is Seoul.

Walsh is picked up by a bishop in Seoul and is dropped off at the Cathedral gate where he observes much. He comments on the Korean's cooking as well as Sunday mass attendees and child singers. A section of the chapter is then solely devoted martyrs who died on Korean soil. After that section, Walsh visits Seoul's seminary and monastery and watches the daily happenings there. He comments on how Catholic buildings are built as well as the process. He later attends a "Garden Party" at the Governor-general's estate. He notes that the All Saints’ Day's service is attended by few (although he does not blame the "busy" Koreans) and he writes of its simplicity. All Souls’ Day comes about and Walsh compares the similarities of Koreans to Americans in certain aspects. That same day, Walsh departs from Seoul regretfully. He writes: “I can only hope that when American missioners get to the field their spirit will be as much as possible like that which it has been my privilege to experience so far in the Orient.”

Walsh leaves Korea and enters China from Antung, Manchuria on November 4, 1917. He stops in Mukden, Manchuria where he comments on many of the same things in the previous chapters: the locals and the Catholic mission accomplishments. While there, he visits an orphanage. He is impressed by the head-dresses of the Manchurian women but considers Mukden a "typical Chinese city, ancient, and dusty, with nothing especially attractive." Walsh takes the train to Tientsin, which he describes as a "flooded city" because of a flood when he first arrives. While there, he visits the city's cathedral and hospital, erected by the Catholic Mission of Tientsin. In the next few chapters, Walsh moves into mainland China.

=== China, Indo-China, and the Philippines ===
In China, Walsh travels through the main cities of Pecking, Chengtingfu, Hankow, Hangchow, Shanghai, Chusan, Ningpo, Taichowfu, Hong Kong, Canton, Macao, and Sancian. As he travels around China, he meets a similar range of missioners participating in a variety of mission work. Like in the previous nations, he visits orphanages, clinics, churches, schools, and government offices. Additionally, Walsh assess the needs that future Maryknollers may encounter. He writes also on the numerous unique customs that a missioner must get used to. Walsh journeys through the cities of Langson, Hanoi, Haiphong, Hainan, and Manila in Indo-China (mostly Vietnam) and the Philippines.

=== The return ===
Walsh begins his return journey after Indo-China. He travels back through China and Japan, taking a ship from Yokohama to Vancouver, Canada. Making his way down the West Coast to Los Angeles, he takes a partially new route back to New York city. By the end of his journey, he had found a field in Asia for the Maryknolls. After meeting with Bishop de Guébriant of Canton, Walsh decides that the Maryknolls will have their first home in Yeungkong. An agreement was signed on Christmas Day 1917 and sends a telegram to Maryknoll stating that his hope for the new mission was high.

== Publication history ==
Observations in the Orient was first published in 1919 by the Catholic Foreign Mission Society of America in Ossining, New York. It has since been reprinted multiple times. Little reviews of the book can be found online. Regardless, Observations in the Orient appears to have some cultural and historical significance due to its numerous reprints.

In 2008, Read Books and Kessinger Publishing, LLC reprinted the book. The book has been reprinted again in 2009 (Cornell University Library), 2010 (Gleed Press), 2012 (Ulan Press and HardPress Publishing), and 2013 (Nabu Press). Fb&c Limited and FORGOTTEN books reprinted it in 2015.
