= James Keller (priest) =

American priest (1900–1977)

James Keller, M.M. (June 27, 1900 – February 7, 1977) was a Catholic priest in the Maryknoll Order. In 1945 he founded The Christophers, a Christian inspirational group which broadcasts a weekly inspirational television show of the same name. It was seen on ABC in that network's early years. After ABC canceled the show in the mid-1960s, Keller continued to produce it for independent distribution. The Christophers continues to be syndicated to local television stations along with a radio version. The organization also holds "The Christopher Awards" ceremony each year, primarily to recognize media that exemplify the human spirit.

== Early years ==
Keller's father was an Irish immigrant named James Kelleher, who changed his name to Keller to avoid anti-Irish sentiment. His mother, Margaret Selby, was Irish on her mother's side and Portuguese on her father's. James Jr. was born in 1900 in Oakland, California, the fourth of six children in a devout Roman Catholic household.

After a brief stint in the US Army, Keller entered a seminary in Menlo Park, California. After two years, he was inspired by contacts with Father Thomas F. Price and Father James Anthony Walsh, leaders of the Catholic Foreign Mission Society of America, more familiarly known as Maryknoll. In 1921, he left California, to attend the Maryknoll Seminary in Ossining, New York.

He spent the summer of 1922 doing orderly work and watching medical and surgical procedures at St. Vincent's Hospital in New York, in order to prepare himself for mission work in areas without medical care. In 1923, he was ordained subdeacon and made a commitment to lifetime celibacy. He then continued his education at Catholic University in Washington, D.C., where he received his baccalaureate and, the following year, a master's degree in medieval history. From a professor, Peter Guilday, he learned the importance of historical trends as opposed to individual occurrences. In 1925 he was, atypically, ordained in his parish church in Oakland, CA., largely because his archbishop thought he would get a better crowd, which would be exposed to the Maryknoll movement.

He was surprised when he was told to remain in California for a vacation while awaiting assignment. Then he learned that Fr. McCormack, who headed the small Maryknoll chapter in San Francisco, had been assigned to a mission in China, and that he was to take over as chapter head at the age of 25, fresh out of school.

Keller never received an overseas mission assignment.

Keller starred in a 1951 documentary called You Can Change the World that was based on his teachings. He went on to be the host of a 1950s and 1960s television show called Christopher Closeup.
