= The Christophers =

Christian organization

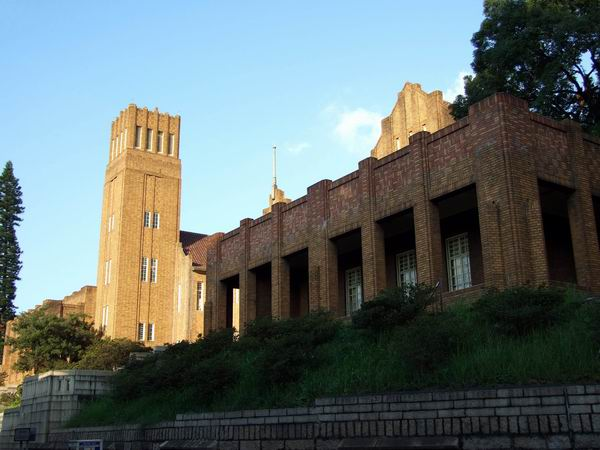
- The Maryknoll Convent School in Hong Kong.
- Formation: 1945
- Type: nonprofit
- Legal status: corporation
- Purpose: spiritual and humanitarian
- Headquarters: 5 Hanover Square, New York, NY
- Region served: USA and international
- Website: www.christophers.org

The Christophers are a Christian inspirational group that was founded in 1945 by Father James Keller. The name of the group is derived from the Greek word christophoros, which means "Christ-bearer". Although the founders were Maryknoll priests, and the Roman Catholic orientation is overt, The Christophers preach a doctrine of religious tolerance and intend their publications to be generally relevant to those of all faiths.

== Founding ==
The early hints of the Cold War revived historical suspicion of Roman Catholic loyalty to the United States. In 1949, Time printed a debate between a Jesuit priest and Professor Walter Bowie of New York's Union Theological Seminary. Bowie stated that there was "a clearly stated Roman Catholic purpose to make America Catholic" and to jeopardize "the religious and civil liberties which have been the glory of Protestant countries . . . ."

In response, a number of Roman Catholics began to find new ways of commending the Church and its ideal to the public, including the new medium of television. Perhaps the most notable of these men was Bishop Fulton Sheen. The most popular and influential television presentation was The Christophers, a weekly half-hour program aired on ABC beginning in 1945. Keller avoided theology and philosophy, going "straight for the watcher's heart."

To espouse the aims of The Christophers, Keller wrote an article for the conservative American Ecclesiastical Review entitled "What About the Hundred Million?" In it, he addressed the needs of Americans (including those from Protestant or other non-Catholic backgrounds) who had no connection to organized religion.

== Mission and activities ==
The motto of both the television show and The Christophers is, "It's better to light a candle than to curse the darkness". The saying is reflected in the television show's theme song, "One Little Candle". It also reflects the philosophical orientation of the organization, which emphasizes positive action to create a better world in such various arenas as political honesty, caring for the sick and poor, and dealing with substance abuse.

Although the foundation and media presentations are overtly Roman Catholic, they are intended to be ecumenical in scope. The organization states that it is "rooted in the Judeo-Christian tradition of service to God and humanity" and that "the Christophers embrace people of every nation, religion and age level."

The Christophers are based in New York City. Their newsletter, Christopher News Notes, is published 10 times a year. They produced a weekly television show (Christopher Closeup) from 1952 to 2012, often featuring interviews with celebrities. Interviewees have included Bob Hope, Jack Benny, Ken Burns, Daniel Rodríguez, Andrew Weil, and Tim Russert. Other incarnations of the show have included dramatic features, with guest stars Don Ameche, James Cagney, and Ricardo Montalbán, among others. The show was originally broadcast on ABC, but later changed its name to Christopher Closeup and was relegated to limited syndication by local cable channels. It also syndicates a weekly radio program of the same name.

== The Christopher Awards ==
The Christopher Awards, made annually since 1949, salute media that "remind audiences and readers of their worth, individuality and power to positively impact and shape our world". Recipients receive a bronze medallion, 4 inches (100 mm) in diameter, depicting a kneeling pilgrim, on whose back sits a radiant child.

The awards have seven categories. Multiple awards are given each year in four categories: Books for Adults, Books for Young People, Feature Films, and Radio & Television. Three other categories generally have a single recipient: the Christopher Leadership Award, the Christopher Life Achievement Award, and the Special Christopher Award. The stated criteria are that nominees "exhibit exceptional artistic and technical proficiency, be able to impact the widest possible audience, and, above all, they must affirm the highest values of the human spirit." Potential winners are nominated and reviewed throughout the year by panels of media professionals, members of The Christophers' staff with expertise in film, TV and publishing, and by specially supervised children's reading groups.

Awards are not limited to those with religious content, and adult content does not disqualify a work; "R-rated" movies, for example, are eligible for awards.

== Other activities ==
The Christophers also offer The Christopher Leadership Course, a course in public speaking and leadership. This course is held in many locations in the US, Canada and other countries.
