= Dalian Catholic Church =

Church building in Dalian, China

Coordinates: 38.9155°N 121.6240°E

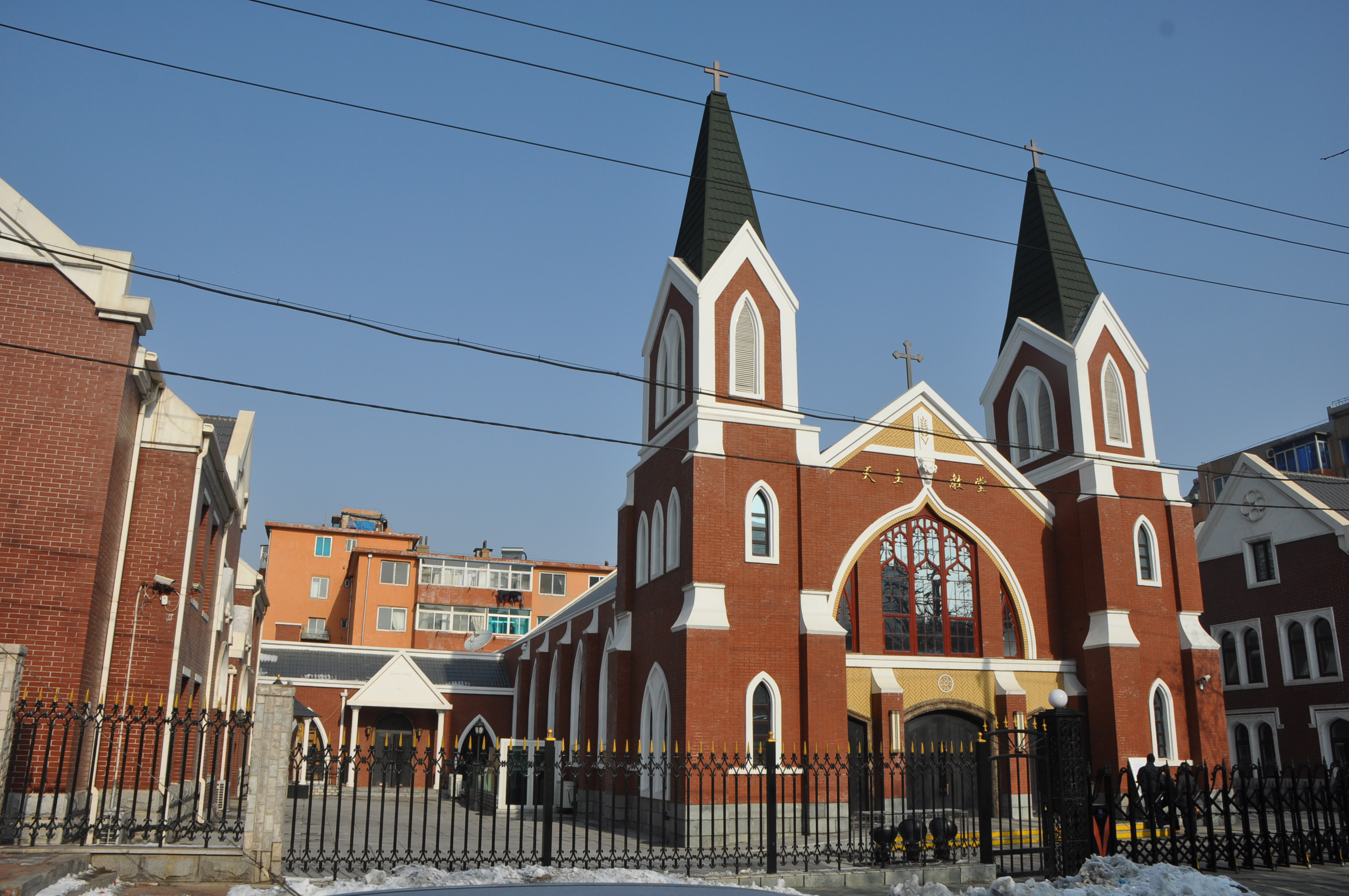
Dalian Catholic Church (newly built in 2013)

Dalian Catholic Church (Chinese: 大连天主教堂) is located in Dalian, China. It was built in 1926 and is the only Catholic church in Dalian. It is now a Historical Building protected by Dalian City.

== Brief history ==
- During the time when Dalian was Japan's leased territory, the activities for dedicating a church were initiated by those Catholic believers who worked for the South Manchuria Railway Co. Their efforts, led by Daiji Oka, resulted in collecting 20,000 yuan to build a Catholic church, which was dedicated in 1926 as Stella Maris Catholic Church under Maryknoll, a Catholic foreign missionary society, headquartered in New York, U.S.A., with a branch in Tokyo.
- From 1931, the Chinese believers moved to the Catholic Church in Liujia Dun. The total number of the believers at Stella Maris Church in Dalian were over 1200.
- As Japan lost the war, the Japanese people left here and the churches became Chinese. As the Cultural Revolution began, Father Ding Runan was forced to engage in agriculture in a village near Shenyang.
- In 1980, Father Ding moved back to Dalian and the church was renamed Sacred Heart Catholic Church. During the 1980s, there were two or three people who got baptised annually. From 1989, Father Guo Jingcheng served, and from 1994, Father Peter Zhang Yongzhe.
- Korean language mass started in 1994, served by Father Cui Zaizhe.

---So far from the history of Dalian Catholic Church---

- Dalian City's Patriotic Catholic Association is housed in the former rectory in the same premises. A bookstore is also in the room on the right and is open on Saturdays and Sundays.
- In 2002, the church building was listed as Dalian City's Historical Architecture.
- In 2013, a new church building was constructed with its exterior similar to the old building's

== At This Church Today ==
- Address: No. 31, Xi-an Street, Xi-gang District, Dalian City, Liaoning Province 116011
- The church retains the form of the building as it was built in 1926. In the six Districts of Dalian, there are six Protestant churches and this one Catholic church.
- Morning Chinese mass is held at 6:30 on weekdays. Chinese mass at 17:30 on Saturdays and 9:00 & 17:00 on Sundays. Korean mass at 14:00 in Sundays. English Mass held at 5 pm on Saturdays in the Parish Center located within the courtyard to the left of the main church.
- Special mass is conducted on Christmas Eve, Christmas Day, Ash Wednesday, Good Friday, Easter, Ascension Day, Pentecost and other important Catholic holidays.

== Gallery ==
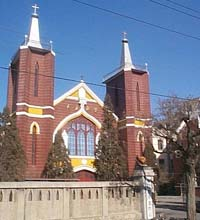
The old church building (1926–2013)

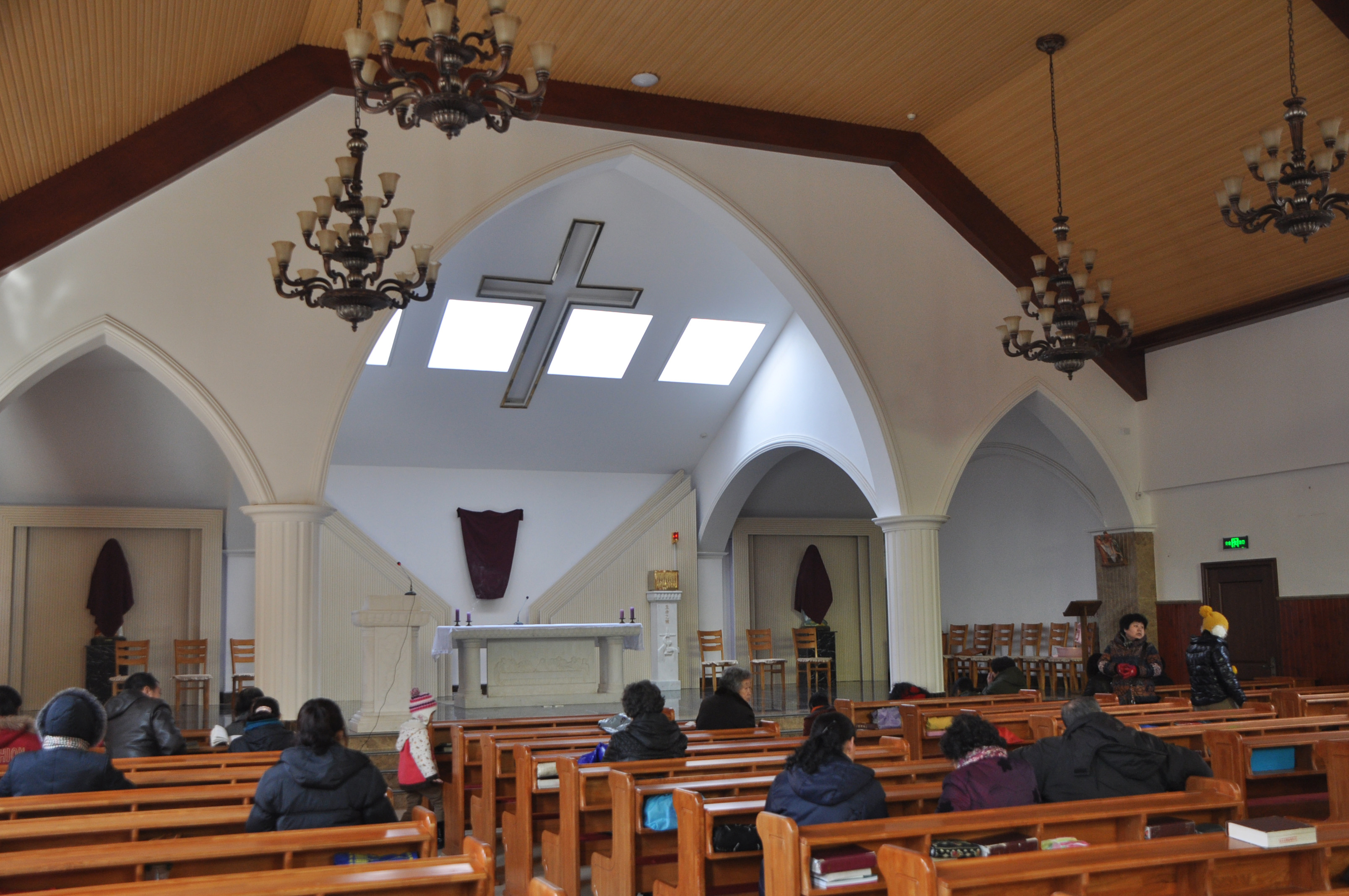
The altar of the new church building (2013-)

== See also ==
- Christianity in China
- Roman Catholicism in China
- Chinese Patriotic Catholic Association
