= Maryknoll Fathers' School =

Coordinates: 22°20′03.07″N 114°10′22.94″E

- Chinese: 瑪利諾神父教會學校
- 2 To Yuen Street, Tai Hang Tung, Kowloon; Hong Kong

Information
- Type: Government funded co-educational, primary, secondary
- Motto: 真理忠貞
- Established: 26 September 1957; 68 years ago
- School district: Shek Kip Mei
- Principal: Sung Hoi Yan
- Grades: P1 – U6
- Affiliation: Maryknoll (Roman Catholic)
- Website: www.mfs.edu.hk
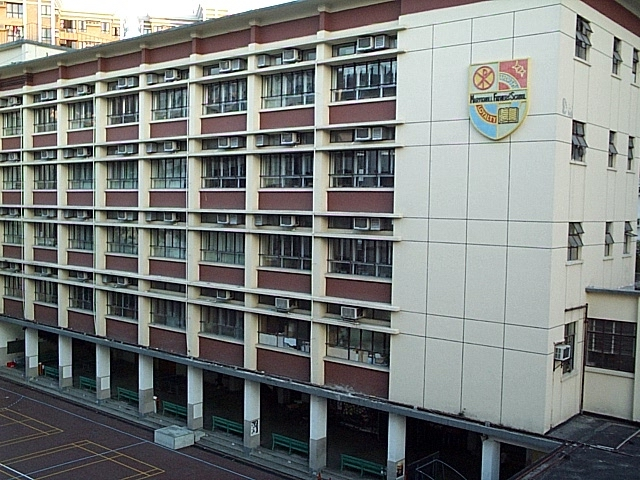

Maryknoll Fathers' School is an aided (government funded) co-educational school in Tai Hang Tung, Kowloon, Hong Kong. The school was founded in 1957 by the Maryknoll Fathers and Brothers.

The school's medium of instruction is Cantonese for the primary section and English for the secondary section.

== History ==
In 1952, Father Peter A. Reilly, an American Catholic priest of the Maryknoll Fathers and Brothers, came to Hong Kong as a missionary. He had been a missionary in Wuchow, Kwangsi for more than a decade, until he was forced to leave after the Chinese Communist Party came to power in 1949. When Father Reilly came to Hong Kong, he put up a small wooden hut in Kowloon Tsai, where he served the poor in that area, including many refugees from the People's Republic of China. He set aside a study room and hired teachers to educate the children of the area.

Father Reilly applied to the government for permission to build a subsidised school. In those days, the government began to focus on the provision of public services such as safe housing, medical care and education. The government granted permission not only for Father Reilly to build the primary school he had hoped for, but also to build a subsidised secondary school, the first of its kind in Hong Kong. To find students and teachers for the school, Father Reilly sought the help of Tong Yu Sheung Woon, the headmistress of Yan Pak School.

On 26 September 1957, the Right Reverend Bishop Lawrence Bianchi (the Bishop of Hong Kong) and Governor Sir Alexander Grantham presided over the official opening and blessing of the school. Father Reilly and Mrs. Tong became, respectively, the first supervisor and the first principal of the school.

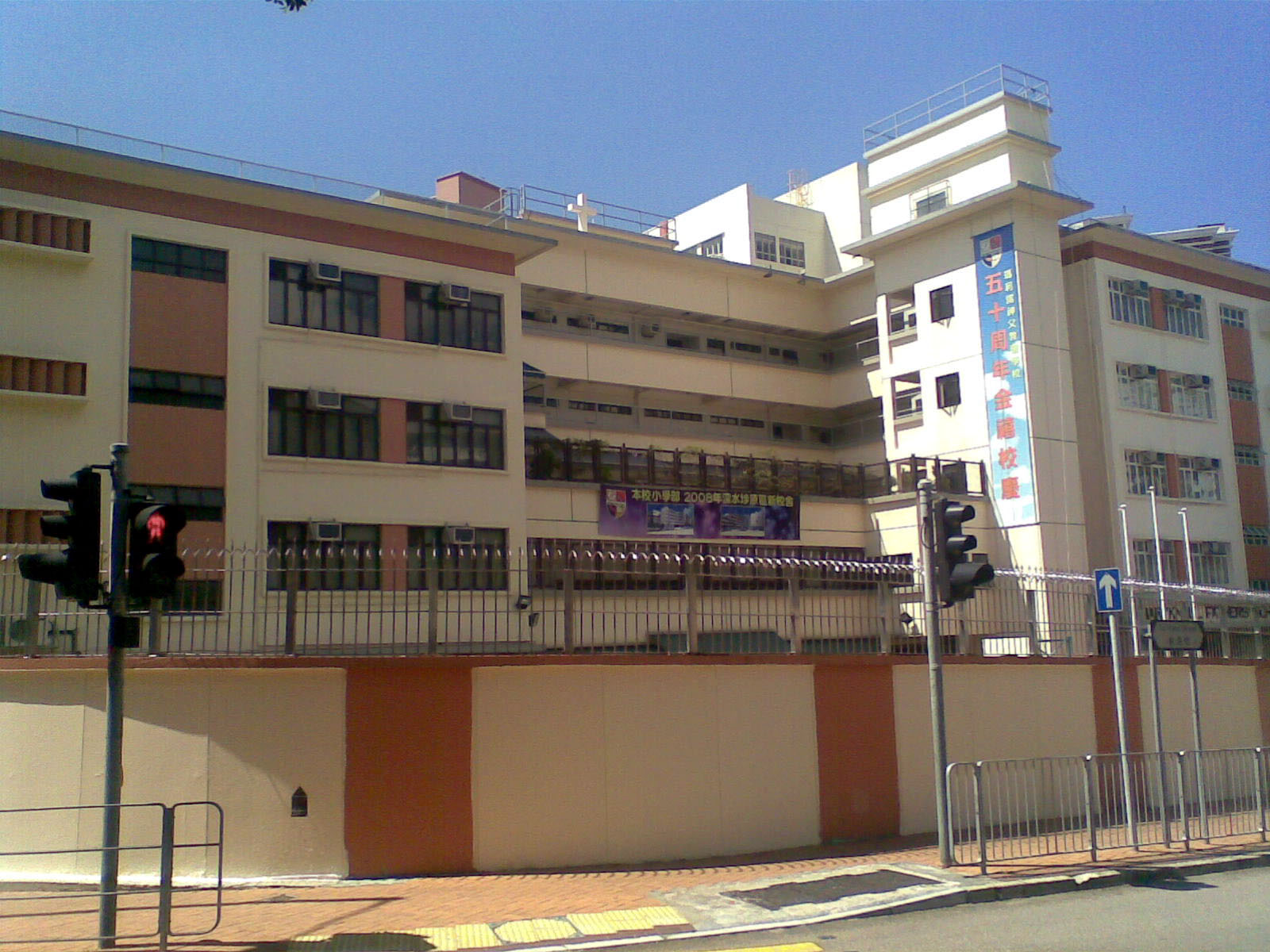
Maryknoll Fathers' School

Encouraged by initial successes and motivated by the need to provide education for the children in the district, the Maryknoll Fathers requested the Education Department for an expansion of the school by the acquisition of a site behind it. The request was approved. On 17 February 1966, the Right Reverend Bishop Frederick Donaghy (the Bishop of Wuchow) blessed the New Wing, which provided space for a library, twelve new classrooms, improved science facilities, and a large hall.

In 2008, the primary section moved to a new campus at 11 Hoi Lai Street, Sham Shui Po. From originally a half-day school (with A.M. and P.M. sections), it became a full-day school.

Father Reilly was supervisor for the rest of his life. He died in 1994. He was succeeded by Father John Geitner from 1995 to 2011, who in turn was succeeded by Father Michael Sloboda from 2011 to 2017. In 2017, Agnes Garman Yeh became the supervisor.

The current principal of the secondary school is Ho Lik Sang and the principal of the primary school is Ng Wai Man.

== Achievements ==
In 2008, two students of the school were awarded second place in the Intel International Science and Engineering Fair (ISEF) for their invention of an "anti-bump lock" that could counter bump keys.
