= Mary Joseph Rogers =

Catholic missionary (1882–1955)

Mother Mary Joseph Rogers
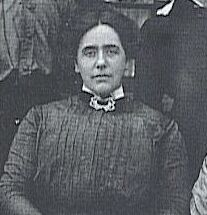
- Rogers in 1913

Personal life
- Born: Mary Josephine Rogers; October 27, 1882
- Died: 9 October 1955 (aged 72)
- Education: Smith College

Religious life
- Religion: Christianity
- Denomination: Catholic Church
- Institute: Maryknoll Sisters

Mary Joseph Rogers MM (née Mary Josephine Rogers; October 27, 1882 – October 9, 1955) was the founder of the Maryknoll Sisters, the first congregation of Catholic women in the United States to organize a global mission. Rogers attended Smith College and was inspired in 1904 by graduating Protestant students preparing to leave for missionary work in China. After her graduation, she returned to the school and founded a mission club for Catholic students in 1905.

While organizing the club, she met Father James A. Walsh, director of Boston’s Office for the Propagation of the Faith, later founder of Maryknoll Fathers & Brothers, through whom she was inspired to establish a mission congregation for women. Rogers moved to Boston in 1908 to teach at public schools and attend the Boston Normal School. The Maryknoll Sisters were founded in 1912. By the time of her death, the Maryknoll Sisters had over 1000 sisters working in some twenty countries. Mother Mary Joseph Rogers was inducted into the National Women's Hall of Fame in 2013.

== Early life ==
Mary Josephine Rogers was born in Roxbury, Massachusetts, United States. Rogers was one of eight children and the first girl born to her parents Abraham T. Rogers and Mary Josephine Plummer. Her paternal grandfather Patrick Henry, emigrated from Ireland to Canada before crossing the border into the United States where he settled in Boston, Massachusetts. At the time Henry made the move to the United States, Irish immigrants were a focus of public persecution. The Rogers family practiced their faith discreetly, as to not draw unwanted attention from anyone. They evaded a lot of the persecution from traditional Protestant Americans by keeping their religious practices to a minimum outside the home. Rogers and her siblings attended Mass, Sunday school, and received the Eucharist weekly. They did these out of duty to their religion, but most of the Catholic principles that are taught and implemented by constant unrestricted immersion in church life came from time at home. Their parents also promoted an understanding of the church's foreign missions through the Society for the Propagation of the Faith and the Holy Childhood.

Henry chose to send his children and grandchildren including Rogers into public schools. In 1901 she graduated top of a Roxbury Protestant public high school class, and spoke as the valedictorian.

== Education/College ==
Rogers went on to complete her undergraduate in 1905 at Smith College in Northampton, Massachussetes. Her degree was in zoology. While at Smith College Rogers found herself drawn to volunteerism and service of the student body. In June of Rogers junior year she felt so strongly moved by the mission- sending of five Protestant classmates she decided she wanted to reconnect with the church. It would not be until a few years later that Rogers would come to understand how she would connect back with the church life.

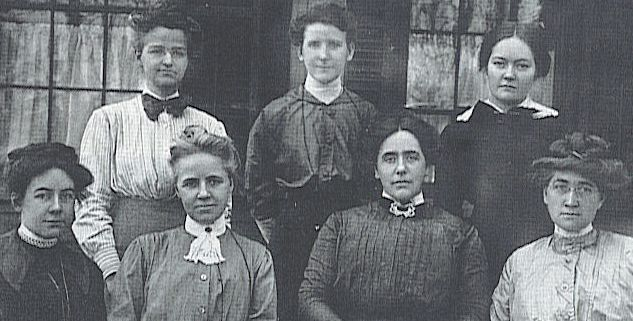
Founder Mary Josephine Rogers, second from right in the front row, with the first 'Teresians' – front row: Mary Louise Wholean, Anna Maria Towle, Sara Sullivan; Back Row: Mary Augustine Dwyer, Nora Shea, Margaret Shea, at Maryknoll in 1913.

After graduating, Smith College invited Rogers back with a position in the Zoology Department. It was her plan to work as well as study to get her master's degree. While taking classes at Smith College, she also received a teaching certificate from Boston Normal School. During her time in the master's program, Rogers was recruited by a professor to help inspire the student body to get involved with service programs on campus. Smith College faculty member Elizabeth Hanscom of the college's English Department suggested forming a group on campus. Rogers was not sure at first if she would be able to start and lead such a group, as she did not have a vast knowledge or background in how to start a mission club. The only example she had to base her choices on came from the Protestant mission work she witnessed while an undergraduate. Because she liked what she witnessed in the Protestant mission sending, she agreed to Hanscom's request. Rogers got help and guidance for the club from Father James A. Walsh who at the time was director of the Boston office of the Society for the Propagation of the Faith. At their first meeting, Walsh explained to Rogers that he believed Catholic Americans needed to be more involved with foreign missions. By the end of that first encounter Rogers found herself moved and asked what else she could be doing to help with Father Walsh's mission. Walsh invited her to help with his magazine The Field Afar. She worked translating documents that came from French missioners to English, and made basic edits to the magazine drafts.

It was not long before she was devoting any and all free time to helping with the magazine. In order to commit more fully to the magazine, Rogers dropped out of the master's program at Smith College and took a job teaching in Boston Public schools. Her role in the Boston public school was an assistant in the biology department. After working on the magazine for some time, Father Walsh began to pay Rogers for the time she was putting in. The magazine is still around today, it is now called Maryknoll Magazine. Despite not finishing her master's degree, before her death Rogers received two honorary degrees and a Doctor of Letters from Smith College.

== Religious work ==
In 1908 Pope Pius X announced that the Catholic Church could support itself as America was no longer considered mission territory. The Catholic Church turned its focus to global missions and Fathers Walsh and Thomas Frederick Price soon began the process of forming a foreign mission seminary in America. Father Walsh In 1911 the Catholic Foreign Mission Society of America was established. They are known today as the Maryknoll Fathers and Brothers. They set up their head office in New York.

Rogers was chosen by Father Walsh in 1912 to take lead of the women that had come forward to help in his foreign mission society. Rogers previous establishment of the mission club at Smith College equipped her with a small amount of knowledge on how a mission based group was run. What Father Walsh asked required her to think broader and even though she did not know yet would reach an international level. What Rogers and the other women did know is that they wanted to be diverse in the type of work they did and who they helped. After the announcement in 1912 by Father Walsh that Rogers would be leading, she took a trip in 1914 to Europe with a friend. She arrived in France and ended the trip in Italy, where they were able to attend Pope Pius X funeral. This trip left Rogers with a deeper knowledge and understanding for religious life.

Recognizing that Rogers would need help to establish the group, the Dominican Sisters of Sinsinawa, Wisconsin offered guidance. The group took some time to be approved as errors in administration and patriarchal concern prolonged the process. Paperwork between the Vatican and the women took a while to go back and forth. At one point some of the paperwork was sent back to the wrong address in New York. Word also got back to the women that there were doubts from those in charge in Rome about how successful the women's group would be. Those in power were quoted saying " American girls would not make good Missioners." Rogers and the women continued their work despite the reluctance of the authorities in Rome. At the start there was only three women including Rogers that were helping Father Walsh and the society.

In February 1920, the Archbishop of New York, Patrick Joseph Hayes, relayed the news that the group of now 35 women was a church approved Diocletian congregation. Their title was "The Foreign Mission Sisters of St. Dominic", it was later changed to the "Maryknoll Sisters of St. Dominic". Rogers was voted to be the official leader in 1925, upon which point she took the name Mother Mary Joseph. She stayed head of the Maryknoll sisters until she retired.

Mother Mary Joseph espoused a belief that God was present wherever a Maryknoll is present, even if the actions taking place were not considered typical of a Catholic missionary. She would use the term cultivate as a way to explain what she felt that Maryknolls should aim to do, stating that "In our active religious life we don’t have time for sustained and long prayer. We must cultivate union with God at every possible moment." Mother Mary Rogers and the other Maryknoll sisters kept this motto in mind on all missions throughout the world.

== Later years ==
Toward the end of her life Mother Mary Joseph took extra care in making time to mentor the new members of the Maryknoll Sisters. She lived with them for a short period of time, until 1952 when she became paralyzed on one side of the body due to a blood clot in her brain. Mother Mary Joseph died at a New York Hospital in October 1955. The Maryknoll Sisters that brought her to the hospital said that even near death she put others before her insisting that the doctors working with her be sure to get a break.
