= James Edward Walsh =

American Roman Catholic prelate (1891-1981)

The Most Reverend James Edward Walsh M.M.
- Bishop of Kongmoon
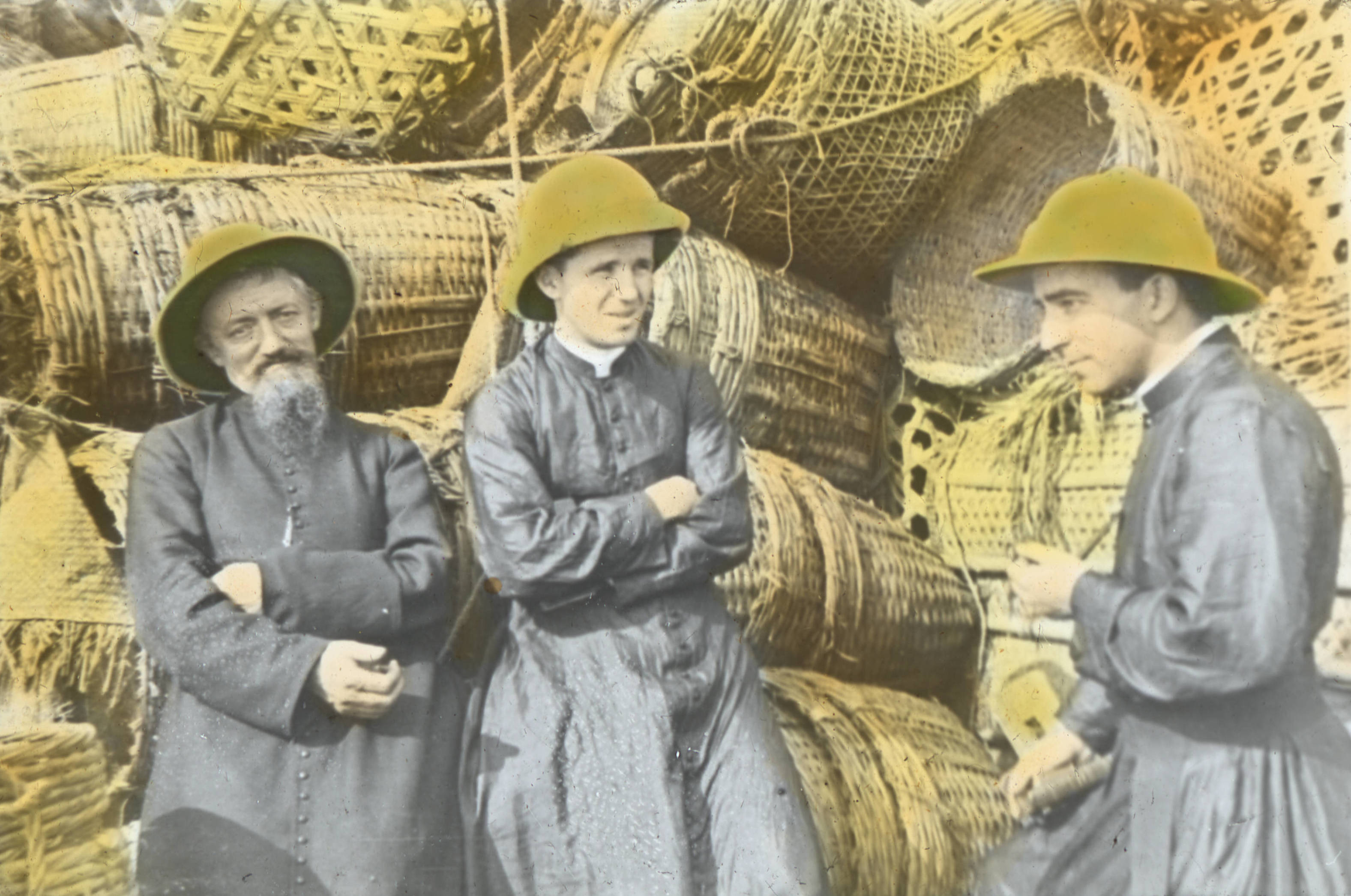
- Group portrait of Maryknoll Fathers: Walsh (centre) with Auguste Gauthier (left) and Francis Xavier Ford (right).
- Church: Roman Catholic Church
- Installed: February 1, 1927
- Term ended: July 1936
- Successor: Bishop Adolph John Paschang
- Other post: Titular Bishop of Sata

Orders
- Ordination: 7 Dec 1915
- Consecration: 22 May 1927

Personal details
- Born: James Edward Walsh; April 30, 1891 Cumberland, Maryland
- Died: July 29, 1981 (aged 90) Maryknoll, Ossining, New York
- Buried: Maryknoll, Ossining, New York
- Occupation: Missionary; bishop; priest; educator; relief worker
- Motto: Primum regnum Dei
- Coat of arms

James Edward Walsh, MM (April 30, 1891 – July 29, 1981) was an American Catholic prelate who served as Bishop of Kongmoon from 1927 to 1936. He was a member of the Maryknoll order and a missionary in China.

== Early life ==
Father Walsh was born in Cumberland, Maryland on April 30, 1891, to Mary Concannon and William E. Walsh. He was the second child of nine. After graduating at age 19 from Mount St. Mary's College, he worked as a timekeeper in a steel mill for two years until he became aware of Maryknoll, a new American order. In 1915, he became the second priest ordained in this order.

== China ==
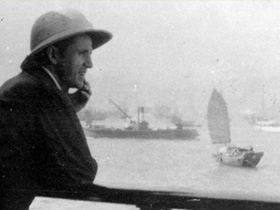
Fr Walsh in China

He and three other men were sent on the order's first foreign mission to China in the year 1918. The other three were Father Thomas Frederick Price, one of the founders of Maryknoll and Superior of the group; Father Francis Xavier Ford; and Father Bernard F. Meyer.

Fr. Walsh and Fr. Meyer arrived first, Fr. Price and Fr. Ford some weeks later. Their first point of debarkation in South China was the British colony of Hong Kong on 30 October 1918. While they were in Hong Kong, they stayed briefly with the Paris Foreign Mission Fathers at Battery Path. From Hong Kong, they went to Yeungkong (now known as Yangjiang) and started their missionary work in China there.

Walsh's early years in China were chaotic, and included being captured by bandits and caught in bloody local conflicts. At the age of thirty-six, on 22 May 1927 he was consecrated Maryknoll's first bishop and served the Diocese of Kongmoon (now known as Jiangmen) in China. The ceremony was held on Sancian Island (now called Shangchuan Island), a lonely spot off the coast of South China where St. Francis Xavier, the Apostle to the Indies, died in 1552.

In 1936, Bishop Walsh left China to return to the United States as head of Maryknoll. During his ten-year term he oversaw Maryknoll's first missions to Latin America and Africa. In November to December 1940, he and Father James M. Drought, his assistant went to Japan to take part in the diplomatic negotiation between US and Japan. However, following the Holy See's special request for his service in China, he returned to take charge of the Catholic Central Bureau in Shanghai in 1948 to coordinate mission activities in China.

When the Chinese Communist Party (CCP) seized power in 1949 they began harassing Catholic clergymen. The Catholic Central Bureau was shut down by the government in 1951. When Walsh's superiors in Maryknoll inquired about his safety he responded by saying, "To put up with a little inconvenience at my age is nothing. Besides, I am sick and tired of being pushed around on account of my religion."

Although he anticipated arrest, Walsh chose to stay and tend to his congregation. He was eventually apprehended by CCP authorities in 1958 and sentenced to twenty years in prison. He spent twelve years of his prison sentence in isolation and was suddenly released in 1970. He was deported via a footbridge to freedom in Hong Kong on 10 July 1970. He is believed to be the last of 7,000 foreign missionaries to be expelled from China after the Communist Revolution in 1949.

Walsh stated he held "no bitterness toward those who tried and condemned me", and spoke approvingly of favorable relations between United States and China. His release was an important gesture leading to the thawing of relations with President Nixon's visit to China in 1972.

== Death ==
Bishop James E. Walsh returned to the United States and died at the age of ninety on July 29, 1981, in Maryknoll, New York, from a heart ailment.

Bishop Walsh Primary School in Hong Kong, founded 1963, was named to commemorate his missionary achievements.

== Bibliography ==
=== Written works ===
- Mission Manual of the Vicariate of Kongmoon (South China). Hong Kong: Nazareth Press. 1937. OCLC 20648219.
- Maryknoll Spiritual Directory. New York: Field Afar Press. 1947. OCLC 2302853.
- The Man on Joss Stick Alley. New York: Longmans, Green. 1947. OCLC 1699327.
- The Church's World Wide Mission. New York: Benziger Bros. 1948. OCLC 2712754.
- Blueprints of the Missionary Vocation. Maryknoll, N.Y.: Maryknoll Publications. 1956. OCLC 643162.
- The Young Ones. New York: Farrar, Straus, and Cudahy. 1958. OCLC 1262450.
- Zeal for Your House. Catholic Foreign Mission Society of America. Huntington, Ind.: Our Sunday Visitor. 1976. ISBN 0-87973-892-8. OCLC 2439380.

=== Biographical accounts ===
- Kerrison, Raymond (1963). Bishop Walsh Of Maryknoll: Prisoner of Red China. New York: G.P. Putnam's Sons. OCLC 855921958.
- Le Veness, Frank Paul (June 1973). "Bishop Walsh's China: The Life and Thought of an American Missionary in China". Chinese Culture. 14: 21–36. OCLC 469777918.
- Sheridan, Robert E. (1981). Bishop James E. Walsh As I Knew Him. Maryknoll Publications. OCLC 702704546.
- Wiest, Jean-Paul (June 1989). "The Spiritual Legacy of Bishop James E. Walsh of Maryknoll". Tripod. 51: 21–28, 56–67. ISSN 1560-2125.

Catholic Church titles
Preceded by Created	Vicar Apostolic of Kongmoon; 1924 – 1936	Succeeded by Adolph J. Paschang, M.M.
Preceded by Created	Titular Bishop of Sata; 1927 – 1981	Succeeded by Vacant
