= James Anthony Walsh =

American Catholic bishop

Servant of God The Most Reverend James Anthony Walsh MM
- Titular Bishop of Seine; Superior General, Maryknoll Fathers and Brothers
- James A. Walsh (c. 1930)
- See: Syene (titular)
- Successor: James Edward Walsh

Orders
- Ordination: May 20, 1892 by John Joseph Williams
- Consecration: June 29, 1933 by Pietro Fumasoni Biondi

Personal details
- Born: February 24, 1867 Cambridge, Massachusetts, US
- Died: April 14, 1936 (aged 69) Maryknoll, New York, US
- Buried: Maryknoll, New York
- Relatives: Timothy Francis Walsh (brother)

James Anthony Walsh (February 24, 1867 – April 14, 1936) was an American Catholic bishop who was the co-founder of the Maryknoll Fathers and Brothers and served as its superior general from 1918 until his death.

== Background ==
=== Early life ===
James Walsh was born on February 24, 1867, in Cambridge, Massachusetts, the son of James and Hanna Shea Walsh. His brother, Timothy Francis Walsh, was an architect and partner in Maginnis & Walsh. After completing his elementary education in the public schools, Walsh attended Boston College High School, where he participated in debate and journalism. After graduating from high school, Walsh enrolled at Boston College. However, he transferred from Boston College to study bookkeeping at Harvard College in Cambridge.

Having decided to enter the priesthood, Walsh enrolled at St. John's Seminary in the Brighton neighborhood of Boston. While at the seminary, he became inspired by Theophane Venard, a French missionary who was beheaded in 1860 in French Indochina, dying a martyr.

=== Priesthood ===
Walsh was ordained a priest for the Archdiocese of Boston by Archbishop John Joseph Williams on May 20, 1892, at the Cathedral of the Holy Cross in Boston. After Walsh's ordination, the archdiocese assigned him as a curate at St. Patrick's Parish in the Roxbury section of Boston. One of his responsibilities was directing the parish sodalities and organizations for young people. During this period, Walsh traveled to France to trace the steps of Venard and other French martyrs.

In 1903, Walsh left St. Patrick's to serve as director of the diocesan chapter of the Society for the Propagation of the Faith, in charge of missionary activities for the Catholic Church. In 1907, in conjunction with the Catholic Foreign Mission Bureau, Walsh founded The Field Afar magazine, a monthly publication about Catholic foreign missions. Mary Joseph Rogers, a young college graduate from Boston, assisted Walsh with the magazine.

=== Establishment of Maryknoll ===
During the 19th century, many of the European missionaries who ministered to Native American peoples in the United States were trained and sponsored by immigration societies in France, the Austrian Empire and other European nations. At the same time that Walsh was writing about the need for American foreign missionaries, Thomas Frederick Price, a priest from North Carolina, was exploring the same idea. The next year, Price and Walsh met in Montreal, Quebec, at the 21st International Eucharistic Congress. While there, they discussed the creation of a seminary in the United States to train priests and brothers for foreign missions.

After gaining the support of American bishops, Walsh and Price traveled to Rome to obtain approval from Pope Pius X for a missionary society in the United States. The pope approved their request and Catholic Foreign Mission Society of America (CFMSA) was established in 1911. It became known as the Maryknoll Fathers and Brothers. Walsh immediately put an ad in The Field Afar that read:

"Youths or young men who feel a strong desire to toil for the souls of heathen people and who are willing to go afar with no hope of earthly recompense and with no guarantee of a return to their native land are encouraged to write."

In 1912, the CFMSA moved into a rented property in Hawthorne, New York, with six male members, included Walsh and Price. Looking for a permanent site, Walsh and Price found a 93-acre hill in Ossining that included three houses and a barn. However, they were worried that local discrimination against Catholics would derail a purchase. Walsh, Rogers and a lawyer arrived at the estate in Ossining. Dressed as a wealthy lady, Rogers and the lawyer went inside to negotiate a purchase. Walsh, masquerading as their chauffeur, waited in the car.

Walsh and Price then began the construction of their seminary in Ossining. Walsh became known for living and working with the new seminarians, preparing them for their foreign missions. Rogers and six other women, known informally as the "secretaries", had been helping Walsh and Price established the CFMSA. After consulting with the two priests, Rogers and the women decided to form a religious congregation known then as the Maryknoll Sisters, with Rogers as their leader. They occupied a residence at the Maryknoll property in Ossining.

Price and three other priests sailed to China in 1918 to begin the first CFMSA mission. One of those priests was James Edward Walsh (not to be confused with the older James Anthony Walsh, the subject of this article). The four missionaries arrived in the Crown Colony of Hong Kong in October 1918. They then settled in the city of Yeungkong (present-day Yangjiang) on the South China Sea. A year later, Price died in Hong Kong of an appendicitis.

=== Superior General of Maryknoll Society ===
Walsh became the superior general of CFMSA in 1918. Rather than serving as a missionary himself, Walsh used his organizational skills to build the organization. Walsh made trips across the United States, Rome, and other places. On April 20, 1933, Walsh was named by Pope Pius XI as titular bishop of Seine. He was consecrated as bishop in Rome on June 29, 1933, in the chapel of the College of Propaganda Fide by Cardinal Fumasoni-Biondi.

=== Death ===
Walsh died at Maryknoll, New York, on April 14, 1936. He was buried in the Maryknoll Cemetery in the town of Maryknoll.

== Publications ==
- Choral Sodality Handbook (1898,1955)
- A Modern Martyr (1907)
- Thoughts from Modern Martyrs (1908)
- Walsh, John Anthony (1919). Observations in the Orient: The Account of a Journey to Catholic Mission Fields in Japan, Korea, Manchuria, China, Indo-China, and the Philippines. Ossining, N.Y.: Catholic Foreign Mission Society of America. OCLC 782089664 (all editions).
- In the Homes of Martyrs (1922)

== Bibliography ==
All the Day Long, Daniel Sargent (1941) Longmans, Green & Company
