= Maryknoll House =

Building in Hong Kong

Coordinates: 22.22072°N 114.21026°E

- Traditional Chinese: 瑪利諾神父宿舍
- Simplified Chinese: 玛利诺神父宿舍
Transcriptions
Standard Mandarin
- Hanyu Pinyin: Mǎlìnuò Shénfu Sùshè

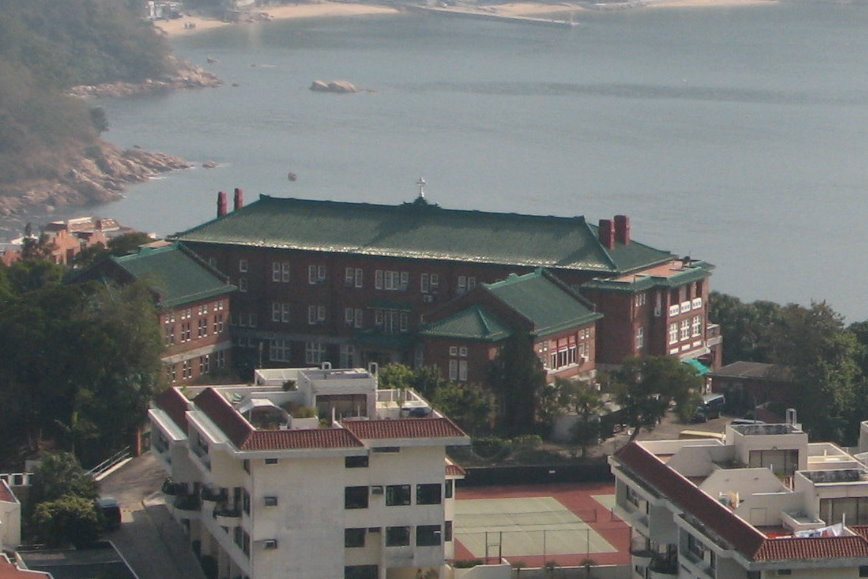
Maryknoll House in Stanley, Hong Kong.

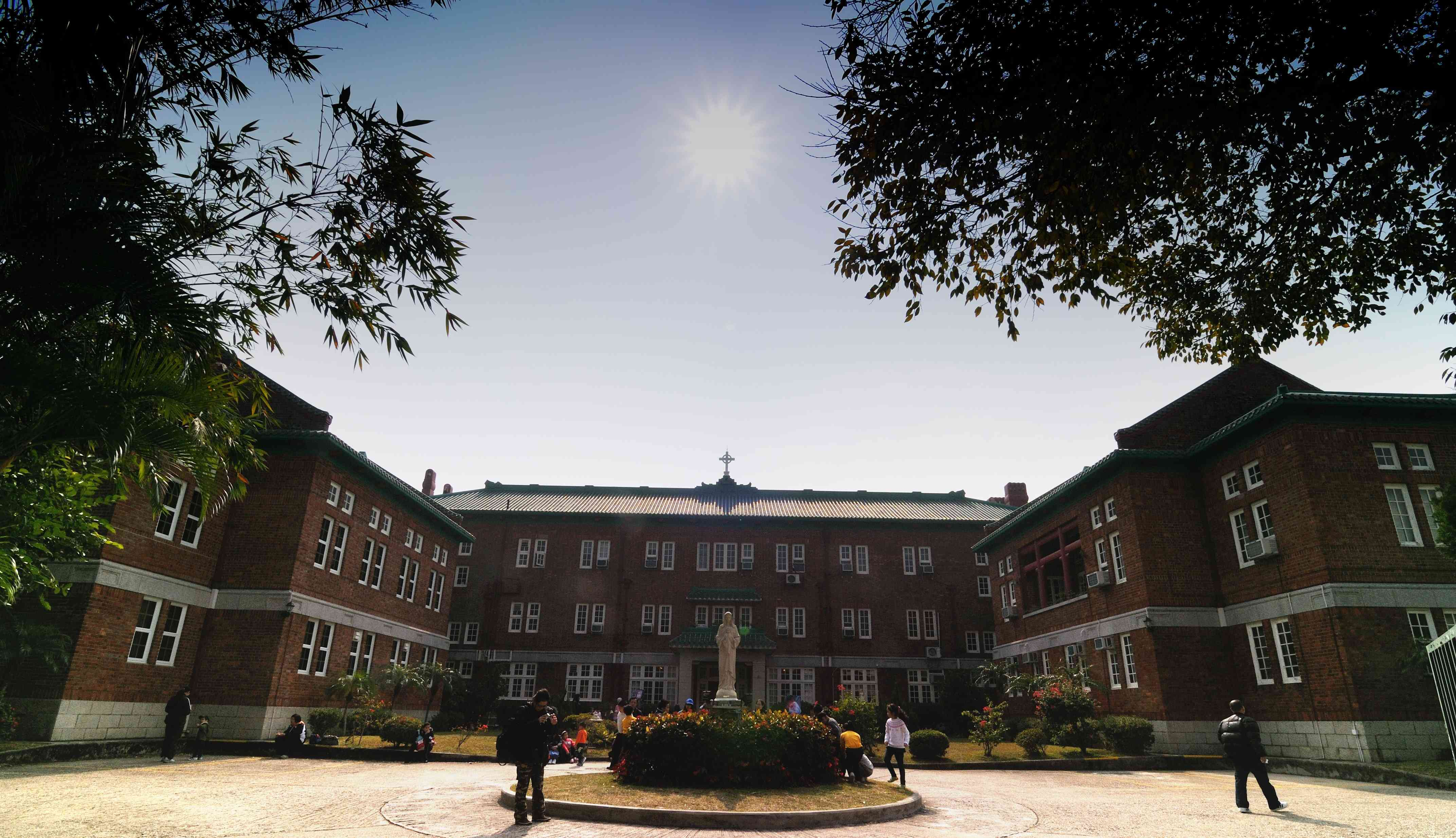
Maryknoll House in Stanley, Hong Kong.

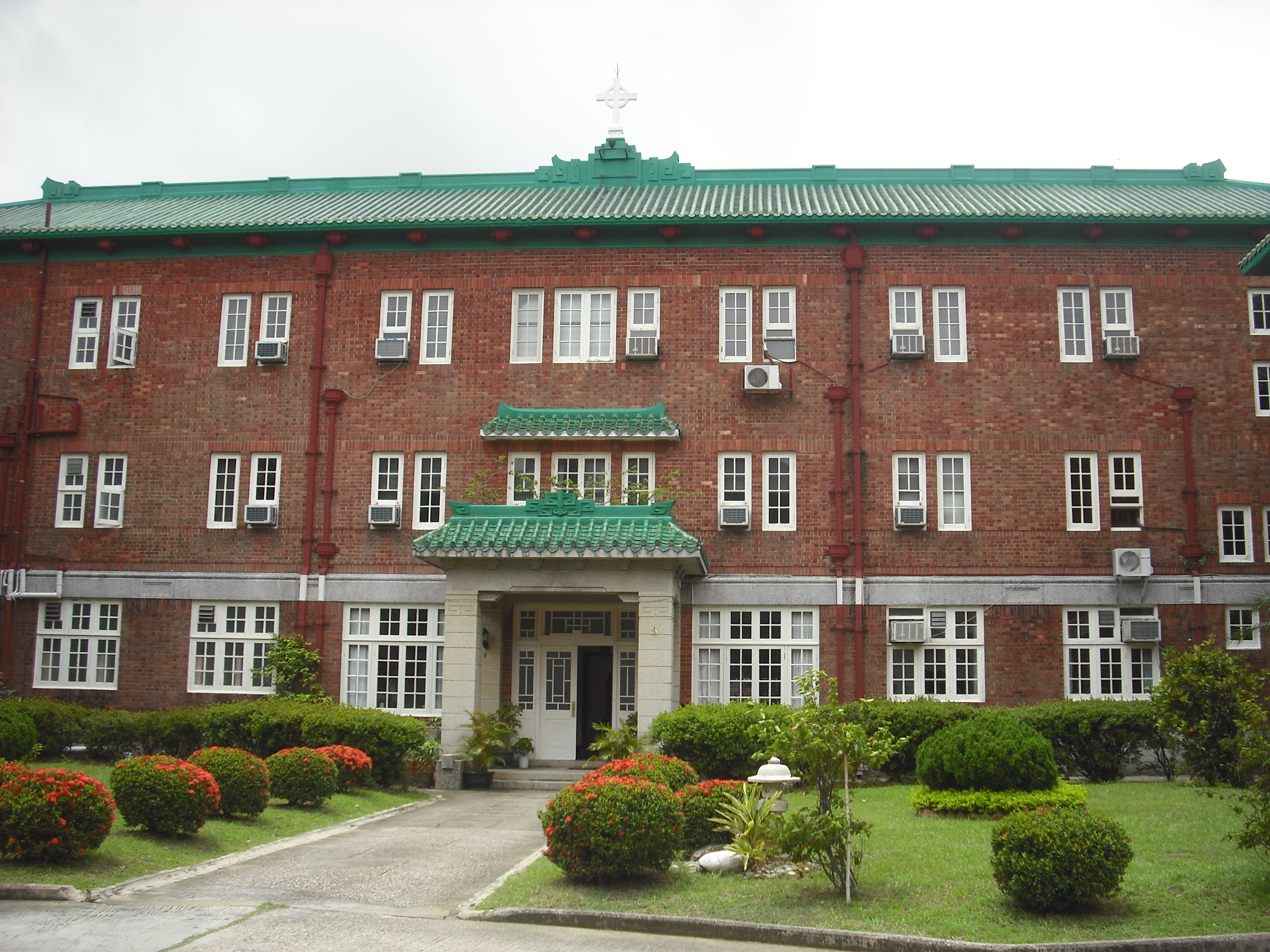
Maryknoll House in Stanley, Hong Kong.

Maryknoll House (Chinese: 瑪利諾神父宿舍) is a Grade I historic building located in Stanley, Hong Kong.

== History ==
Built in 1935, Maryknoll House served as the local headquarters of the Maryknoll Fathers and Brothers, as well as a rest house and a language school for priests who were going to preach in China. As Fr Patrick Byrne, Assistant Superior General, explained:

...it is our custom for missioners to spend several months either in one particular station in the Interior, or visiting various stations, and after months of this, including...more or less precarious travel, because of bandits..., as well as poor food and all sorts of delightful company like fleas and such, a vacation of a couple of weeks at the rest house, looks more or less like a million dollars. These rest periods mean much toward maintaining the morale of the men, and consequently contribute in no small part to the effective work done by them.

In December 1941, the residents were moved to the Stanley Internment Camp and the property occupied by the Japanese. After the war, Stanley became once again a mission center, and a refuge after China expelled missionaries in 1949.

The Stanley House was declared “a cultural asset” by the Hong Kong government in the 1990s. In 2016, the house was purchased by CSI Properties, which planned to redevelop the property for residential use while retaining some historical architectural elements.
