= Maryknoll Lay Missioners =

Roman Catholic organization

Maryknoll Lay Missioners (MKLM) is a Catholic organization inspired by the mission of Jesus to live and work in poor communities "for a more just, compassionate and sustainable world". They currently work in Africa, Asia, South America, and North America.

== History ==
The Maryknoll Fathers and Brothers and the Maryknoll Sisters were founded in 1911 and 1912, respectively. After the Second Vatican Council closed in 1965, both organizations started work on starting a lay institute (following the council's encouragement of more lay involvement and ministry in the church; see Lumen Gentium). Four lay people started preparing for mission work in 1974, and the Maryknoll Lay Missioners were officially founded in 1975 as a collaboration between the Fathers & Brothers and the Sisters. The MKLM worked alongside the Maryknoll Fathers, Brothers, and Sisters in their ministries, guided by Catholic social teaching.

In 1994, MKLM was established as an independent non-profit organization with church recognition, officially named the Maryknoll Mission Association of the Faithful (MMAF), having separate leadership and governance from the other Maryknoll entities and raising its own funding; the popular name Maryknoll Lay Missioners would be officially adopted in 2004. MKLM maintains a close working relationship with the Fathers, Brothers, Sisters and Affiliates.

MKLM is one of the largest lay Catholic mission-sending organizations in the U.S. and possesses 40 years of experience in supporting laity in overseas mission. The organization has prepared approximately 700 missioners to serve overseas over this time. MKLM recruits new missioners (single people, married couples and families with children); helps potential missioners through a discernment process; trains new missioners with an intensive 10-week orientation; provides ongoing mission education, including language and cultural experiential learning; and helps match missioners’ talents with the needs of the population they will serve. The organization provides for its missioners a living allowance, health insurance, worker's compensation, life insurance, retirement plan, human resource support and initial travel to and from mission. MKLM helps to transition missioners returning to the U.S., including re-entry counseling, limited employment counseling and networking.

== Martyrs ==
- Lay Missioner Jean Donovan was killed in El Salvador on December 2, 1980, alongside Maryknoll Sisters Maura Clarke and Ita Ford, and Ursuline Sister Dorothy Kazel.
