= Thomas Frederick Price =

American religious group co-founder (1860–1919)

Servant of God Thomas Frederick Price M.M.
- Co-founder of Maryknoll
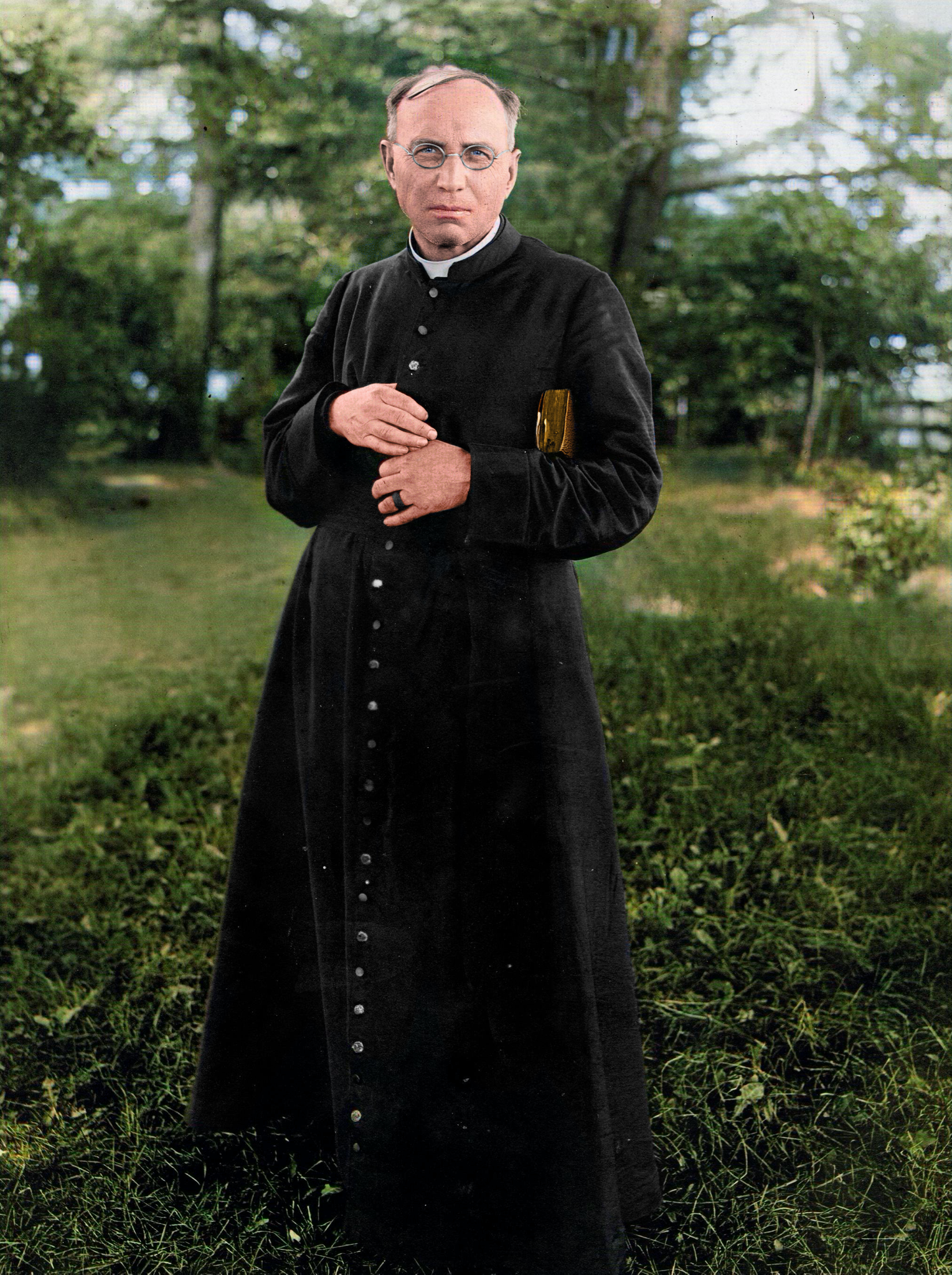

Orders
- Ordination: June 20, 1886 by Henry P. Northrop

Personal details
- Born: August 19, 1860 Wilmington, North Carolina, United States
- Died: September 12, 1919 (aged 59) St Paul’s Hospital, Causeway Bay, British Hong Kong
- Buried: Maryknoll, Ossining, New York
- Denomination: Roman Catholic
- Parents: Alfred Price & Clarissa Bond
- Occupation: Missionary, priest
- Education: St. Charles College; St. Mary's Seminary

Thomas Frederick Price, MM (August 19, 1860 - September 12, 1919) was the American co-founder of the Catholic Foreign Mission Society of America, better known as the Maryknoll Fathers and Brothers.

== Early life ==
=== Childhood ===
Thomas Price was born on August 19, 1860, in Wilmington, North Carolina, the eighth of ten children of Alfred and Clarissa Bond Price. Clarissa was a Methodist who converted to Catholicism when she was a girl, alienating her family forever. She had a special devotion to the Virgin Mary. When Clarissa married Alfred, a newspaper publisher in Wilmington, he was an Episcopalian. However, he also converted to Catholicism in 1866. Price attended the St. Thomas parish school in Wilimington, where his two older sisters, Margaret and Mary, served as teachers. They left the school after becoming members of the Sisters of Mercy. Mark Gross, pastor of the church, then took over the teaching.

During the later 1860s, Bishop James Gibbons, the first vicar apostolic of North Carolina, was a frequent visitor to St. Thomas Parish. When Gibbons celebrated mass at the church, Price served as his altar boy. He also accompanied Gibbons on some of his official trips in North Carolina. Gibbons was a great influence on Price's religious direction.

=== Seminary study ===
When Price was a teenager, he told Gross that he wanted to study for the priesthood. In August 1876, Gross arranged for Price to enter St. Charles College. It was the minor seminary for teenagers run by the Archdiocese of Baltimore in Catonsville, Maryland.

Price left Wilmington in 1876 for St. Charles, sailing on the steamship Rebecca Clyde. The ship ran into a strong storm and became disabled near Ocracoke Inlet at Cape Hatteras in North Carolina. The ship broke into pieces that were eventually washed up on the beach of Portsmouth Island. A poor swimmer, Price recalled seeing a vision of the Virgin Mary directing him to a floating plank. Price reached the plank and hung onto it until his rescue. He returned home to Wilmington to recuperate from his ordeal. This episode strengthened his devotion to Mary. Price was further delayed by illness from going to Maryland.

In 1877, Price entered St. Charles College. He graduated in June 1881. Price then continued his formation for the priesthood in September at St. Mary's Seminary, the major seminary for the archdiocese in Baltimore.

== Early priesthood ==
=== First assignments ===
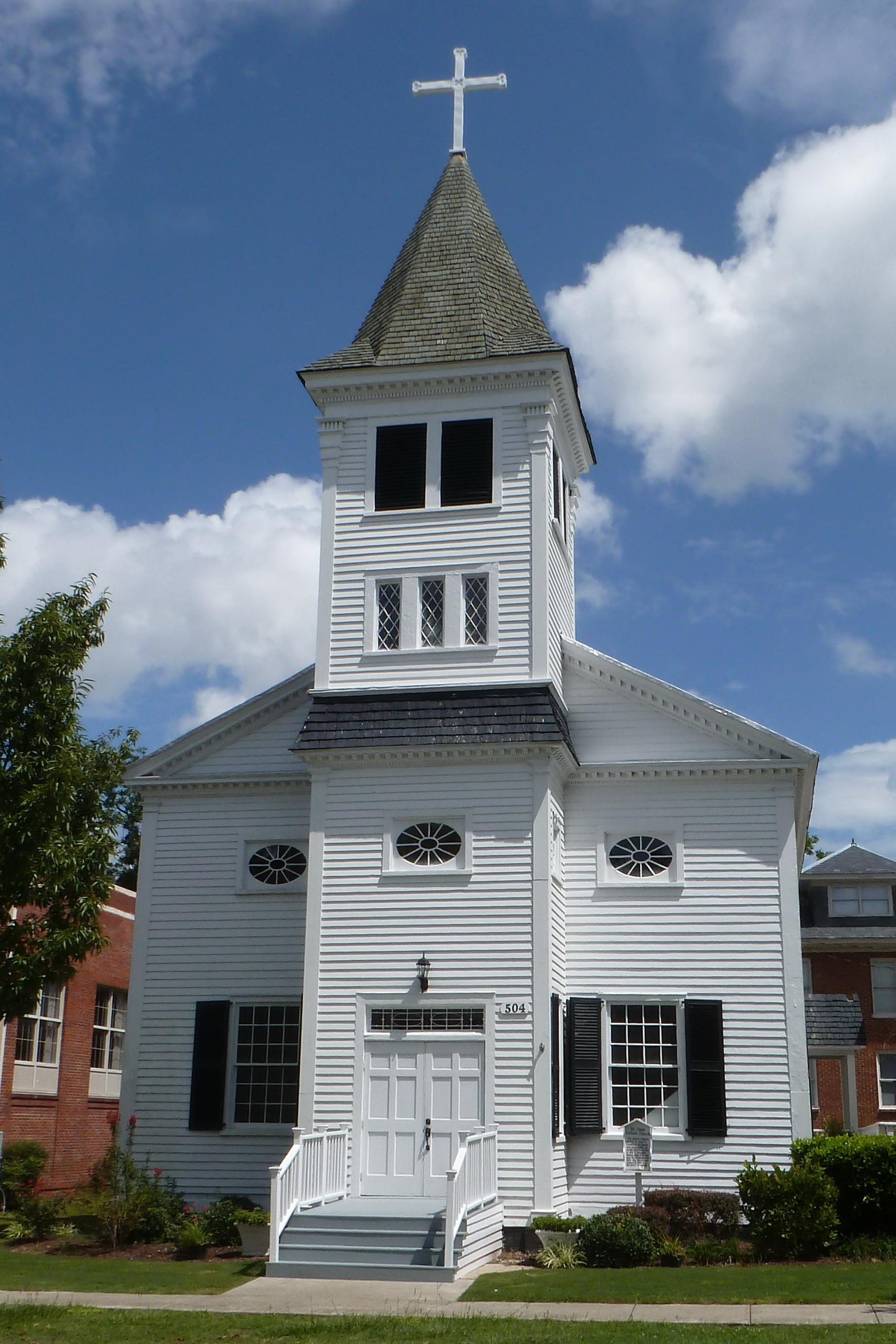
St. Paul's Church, New Bern

Price was ordained to the priesthood for the Apostolic Vicariate of North Carolina on June 20, 1886, by Bishop Henry P. Northrop, the vicar apostolic of North Carolina, at St. Peter's Pro-Cathedral in Wilmington. Price was the first North Carolina native to be ordained a priest.

After his ordination in 1866, Northrup assigned Price to stints as an assistant pastor at parishes in Wilmington and Asheville, North Carolina. He was then named as pastor of St. Paul Parish in New Bern, the oldest parish in the state. He was responsible for the small Catholic population scattered throughout Eastern North Carolina. He would travel by carriage to the 17 missions in the region.

=== Evangelism in North Carolina ===
Around 1890, Price received permission from Bishop Leo Haid, the vicar apostolic, to begin a statewide evangelization program. Price stated that his goal was to convert every resident of North Carolina to Catholicism. His methods were influenced by Walter Elliott, a Paulist preacher. Price was transferred to serve as pastor of Sacred Heart Parish in Raleigh, North Carolina. In 1897, Price started publishing the magazine Truth as an aid to his evangelization. Price and his sister Mary founded the Nazareth Orphanage in Raleigh.

Price then organized summer catechizing teams of seminarians. In 1902, Price opened Regina Apostolorum, a preparatory seminary for missionaries serving in the United States. The Regina Apostolorum was located in Raleigh, with Price serving as its primary teacher and spiritual director.

== Foreign missions ==
=== Foundation of Maryknoll Society ===
During the 19th century, many of the European missionaries who ministered to Native American peoples in the United States were trained and sponsored by immigration societies in France, the Austrian Empire and other European nations. In 1909, Price began writing in Truth about the need for an American missionary society that would send its recruits to East Asia. At the same time, James Anthony Walsh of Boston was developing the same idea in the pages of The Field Afar. The next year, Price and Walsh met in Montreal, Quebec, at the 21st International Eucharistic Congress. While there, they discussed the creation of a seminary in the United States to train priests and brothers for foreign missions.

With the American hierarchy's approval, the two priests traveled to Rome in June 1911 to receive final approval from Pope Pius X for their project. After meeting with the pope, Price traveled to the Sanctuary of Our Lady of Lourdes in Lourdes, France, for the first time. During his stay at Lourdes, Price had a spiritual experience that he refers to in his diary: he maintained a special devotion to Our Lady of Lourdes and to Bernadette Soubirous until his death.

Returning to the United States, Price and Walsh began establishing the new seminary and the foreign mission society. After a brief stay at Hawthorne, New York, the property was purchased at Ossining, New York, for the site of the new foundation, the Catholic Foreign Mission Society of America (popularly known as Maryknoll).

=== Mission trip to China ===
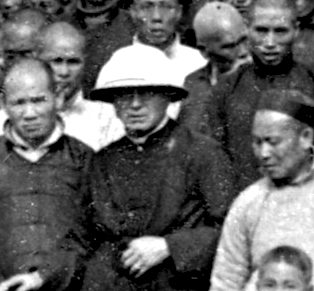
Price in China (1918)

Price made a countrywide tour of America to gain support for the new endeavor. By 1918, three young priests (James Edward Walsh, Francis Xavier Ford, and Bernard F. Meyer) were ready for the foreign missions in China. On September 7, 1918, Price went with them as superior to the new mission. From the time of Maryknoll's foundation, Price had understood that Walsh was capable of administering and directing the seminary itself. Price himself had always hoped to be chosen as one of Maryknoll's first missioners, and his dream was realized.

The four American missionaries arrived in the Crown Colony of Hong Kong in October 1918. They then settled in the city of Yeungkong (present-day Yangjiang) on the South China Sea. Price had great difficulty learning the Chinese language due to its complexity.

=== Death ===
In August 1919, a serious illness forced Price to take the 230 miles (370 km) trip from Yangjiang to Hong Kong for treatment. Arriving in Hong Kong on August 19, he entered St. Paul's Hospital in Causeway Bay. Price was diagnosed with an appendicitis and underwent surgery on September 6. A priest recited prayers with him in the hospital. Price died on September 12 at age 59 due to a ruptured appendix.

Bishop Dominic Pozzoni, the apostolic vicar of Hong Kong, celebrated a solemn requiem mass for Price on September 18 at the Cathedral of the Immaculate Conception in Hong Kong. A large number of priests and religious sisters attended the service. Price was buried in the priests' plot at St. Michael's Cemetery in Happy Valley, Hong Kong.

== Legacy ==
Before he died in 1919, Price requested that his heart be sent to Sisters of Charity of Nevers in Nevers, France. However, it was not until 1923 that a French missionary was able to fulfill this request. The sisters placed his heart in their motherhouse, close to the crypt of Bernadette Soubirous, a sainted girl to whom he was devoted.

Price's remains were exhumed from St. Michael's Cemetery in 1936 and reinterred at the Maryknoll Cemetery in Ossining. In 1955, his remains, together with Walsh's, were placed in the crypt below the Maryknoll Seminary Chapel.

== Veneration ==
In March 2012, Bishop Michael Burbidge of the Diocese of Raleigh opened a formal cause for canonization of Price. At that point, Price was named a Servant of God.

== Writings ==
- Bernadette of Lourdes (1914)
- The Lily of Mary (1918)

== Bibliography ==
- John T. Sedden, When Saints Are Lovers. The Spirituality of Maryknoll Founder Thomas F. Price, Liturgical Press (1997), 184 pages
