= Maryknoll =

Catholic mission movement

Maryknoll is a Catholic missionary movement consisting of four organizations. Together, as lay people, priests, religious brothers and religious sisters, they work as missioners around the world.

== Mary's Knoll to Maryknoll ==
In 1912, the Catholic Foreign Mission Society of America established their headquarters in Ossining, New York, on top of a hill they called "Mary's Knoll", their first house in Hawthorne, New York, being too small. Eventually, this was shortened to "Maryknoll". The Maryknoll Society was the first Catholic missionary society in the United States; until then the United States was considered mission territory. The Maryknoll Mission Center and Museum is located in Ossining.

Maryknoll has its own Post Office and zip code (10545). In 1921 Katherine Slattery (Sr. Margaret Mary), who had previously worked for the Postal Service, opened the first U.S. Post Office at Maryknoll and became its first Postmistress.

== The Maryknoll ==
The Maryknoll Society, also known as the Maryknoll Fathers and Brothers, was founded in 1911 for those men who desired entering the Religious Life. Their members take an oath, similar to a religious vow.

The Maryknoll Sisters were founded in 1912 for women who wanted to enter religious life and maintain the Maryknoll Missioner's charism.

The Maryknoll Lay Missioners, often shortened to MKLM, began as a collaborative ministry between the Fathers and Brothers and the Sisters in 1974. MKLM became its own organization within the Maryknoll family in 1994. It is for those individuals and families who wish to serve in mission around the world, serving those less fortunate or on the margins.

The Maryknoll Affiliates, are a Maryknoll organization for those who are not called to mission, but have an appreciation of the Maryknoll charism or spirituality. They meet around the world in regional chapters.

== Maryknoll ==
Today, Maryknoll is used as a catch-all term related to the four organizations: Maryknoll Lay Missioners, Maryknoll Society of Fathers and Brothers, the Maryknoll Sisters, and the Maryknoll Affiliates. In addition to those four organizations, it can also reference the Maryknoll Office of Global Concerns, a collaborative ministry of the Lay Missioners, Fathers and Brothers, and Sisters that serves as a resource for Maryknoll leadership and Maryknoll missioners to enable them to act when appropriate on behalf of peace, social justice and the integrity of creation.

== Maryknoll Magazine ==
In 1907, Fr. James Walsh, then director of the Society for the Propagation of the Faith for the Archdiocese of Boston, founded The Field Afar, a magazine to promote awareness of the Church's foreign missions. A main feature of the magazine were letters from missioners. Mary Josephine "Mollie" Rogers assisted Walsh in selecting, translating and editing the numerous mission letters that arrived for use in the magazine. After founding the Maryknoll Sisters of St. Dominic in 1912, the sisters took over much of the responsibility for the production and mailing of The Field Afar. Maryknoll Brothers would then haul the mail sacks to the Ossining train station for distribution.

In 1918, the name "Maryknoll" was added to the title and at the 50th anniversary of the publication the wording “The Field Afar” was dropped. Maryknoll magazine, and its Spanish equivalent Revista Misioneros, have a readership of more than 330,000.

== See also ==
- Thomas Frederick Price
