= Diocese of Jiangmen =

Roman Catholic diocese in China

Coordinates: 22.5779°N 113.0863°E

Diocese of Jiangmen Dioecesis Chiammenensis 天主教江门教区

Location
- Country: China
- Ecclesiastical province: Guangzhou
- Metropolitan: Guangzhou

Statistics
- Area: 35,000 km^{2} (14,000 sq mi)
- Population: Total; Catholics: (as of 1950); 4,000,000; 8,292 (0.2%)

Information
- Rite: Latin Rite
- Cathedral: Cathedral of the Immaculate Heart of Mary in Zhongshan

Current leadership
- Pope: Leo XIV
- Bishop: Paul Liang Jian-sen
- Metropolitan Archbishop: Joseph Gan Junqiu

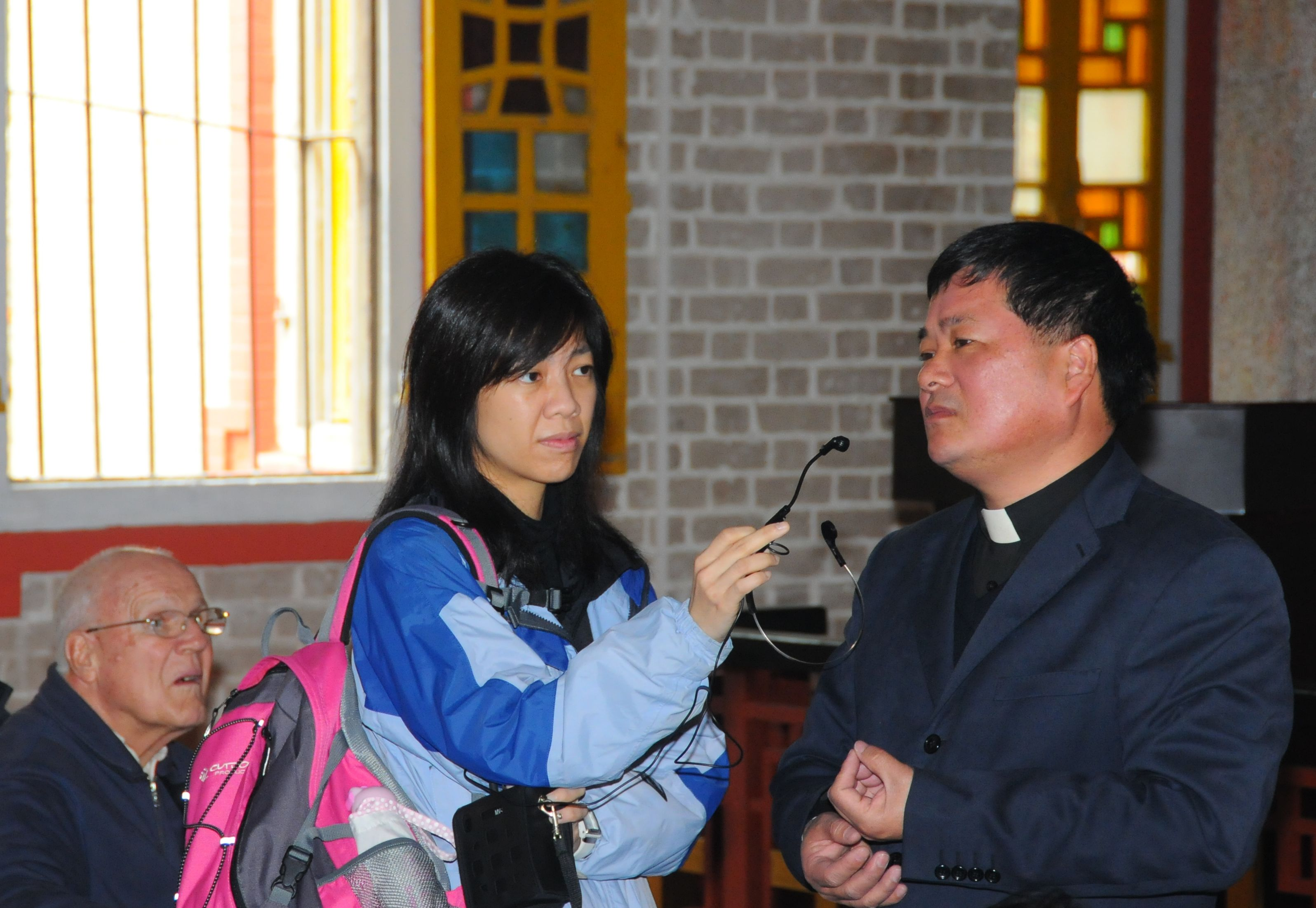
Fr Liang Jian-sen, current Bishop of Jiangmen introducing the history of Immaculate Heart of Mary Cathedral to students of the five Maryknoll Fathers schools from Hong Kong. On the left of the photo is Fr Thomas A. Peyton. Photo taken on 19 March 2011.

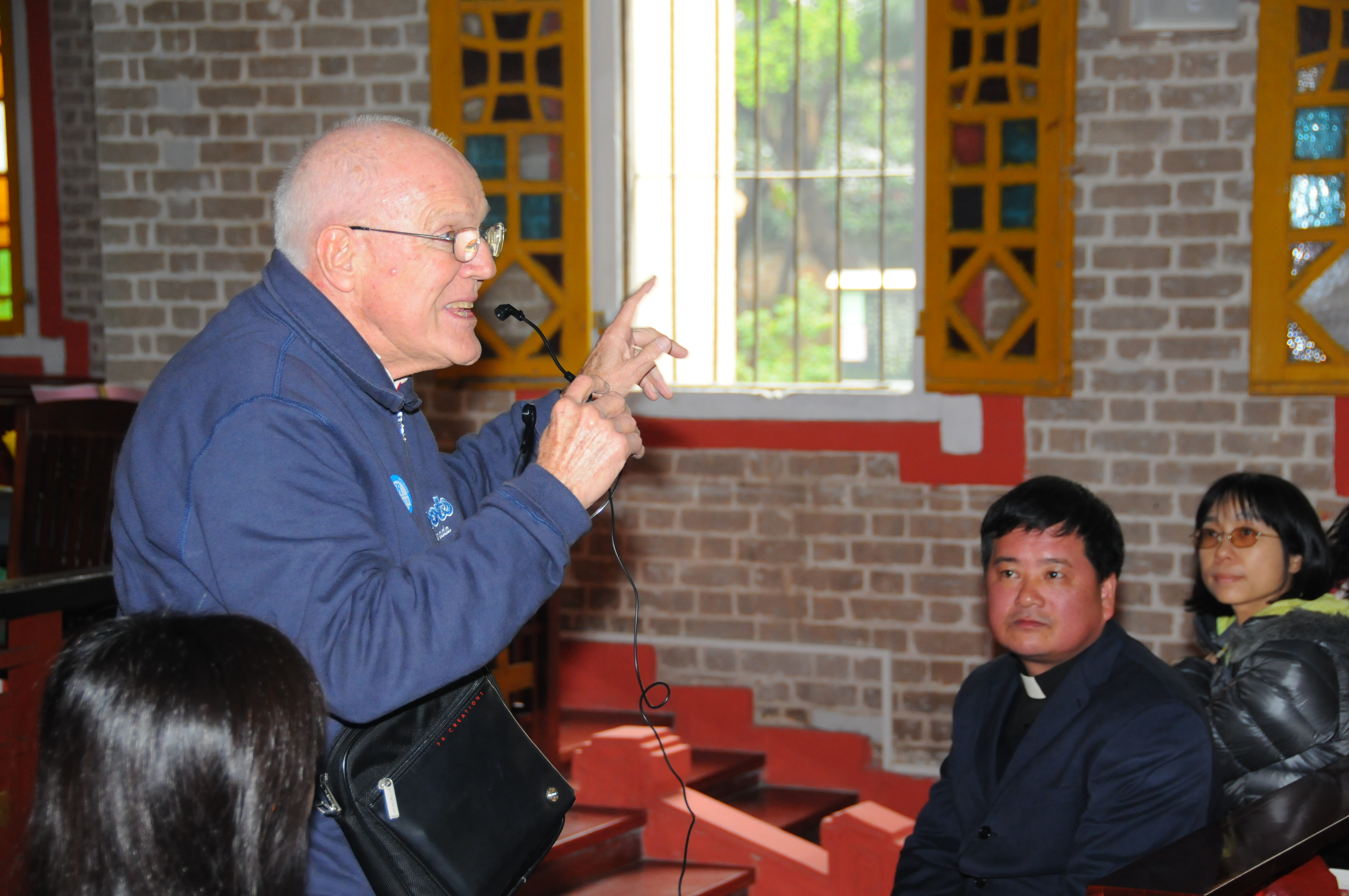
Fr Thomas A. Peyton introducing the history of Bishop Adolph John Paschang, who used to serve in this Immaculate Heart of Mary Cathedral, to students of the five Maryknoll Fathers schools from Hong Kong. On the right hand side of the photo is Fr Liang Jian-sen. Photo taken on 19 March 2011.

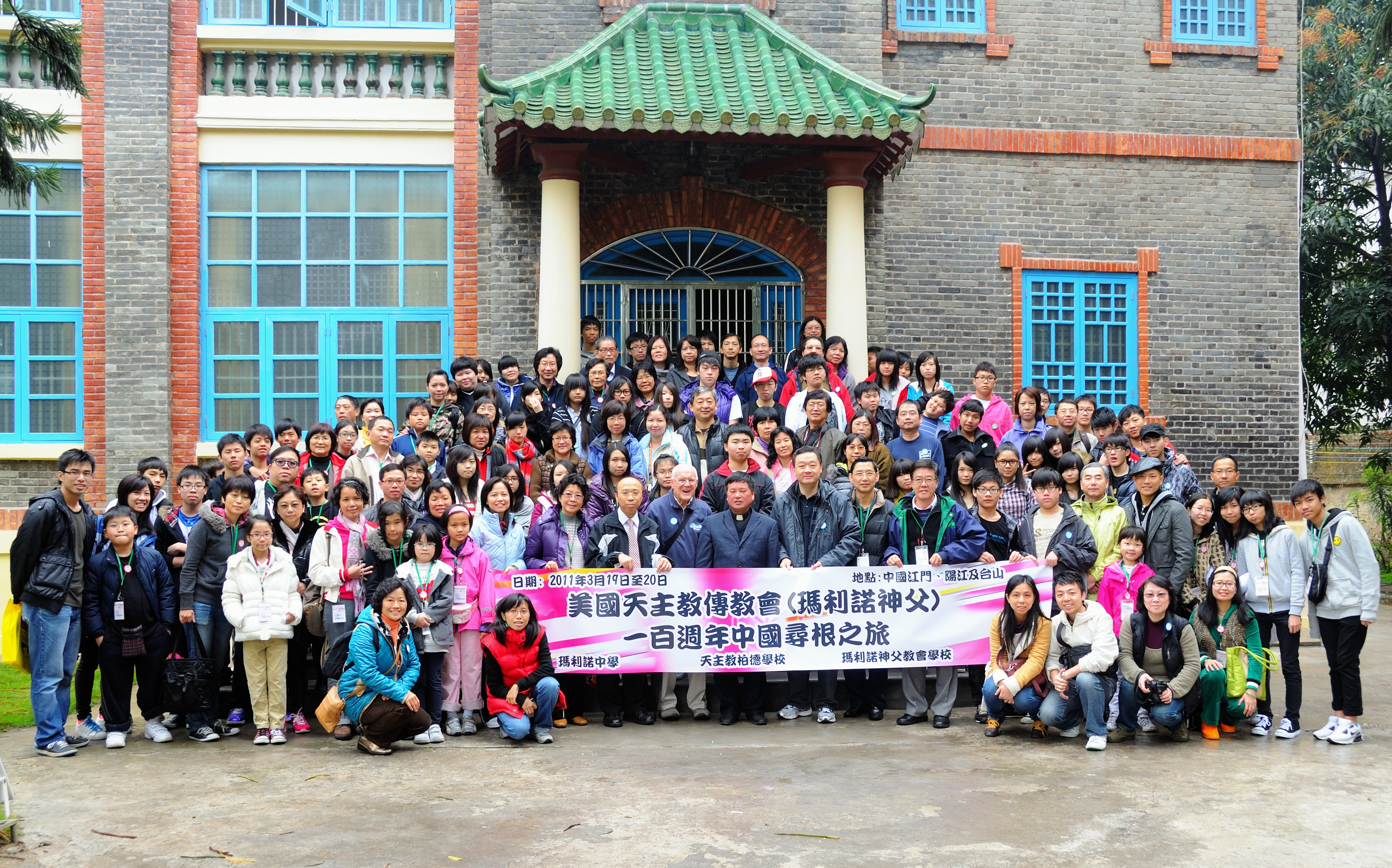
A group photo of the students of the five Maryknoll Fathers schools from Hong Kong in front of the Immaculate Heart of Mary Cathedral at No. 67 Hai Bang Road, Bei Jie, Jiangmen, where Bishop Adolph J Paschang used to serve. Right in the middle of the front row is Fr Liang Jian-sen who is now Bishop of the Catholic Diocese of Jiangmen. Photo taken on 19 March 2011.

The Roman Catholic Diocese of Jiangmen/Kongmoon (Latin: Chiammenen(sis), Chinese: 江門) is a diocese located in the city of Jiangmen in the ecclesiastical province of Guangzhou in China.

== History ==
It was established as Apostolic Prefecture of Jiangmen 江門 from the Apostolic Vicariate of Shantou 汕頭 on January 31, 1924. Then on February 3, 1927 it was promoted as Apostolic Vicariate of Jiangmen 江門.

On April 11, 1946 it was promoted as Diocese of Jiangmen 江門.

== Special churches ==
- Former Cathedral:
  - 圣母无玷圣心堂（原本主教座堂）
    (Immaculate Heart of Mary Former Cathedral)

== Leadership ==
- Bishops of Jiangmen 江門 (Roman rite)
  - Bishop Paul LIANG Jian-sen, consecrated 30 March 2011
  - LI Pen-shi (1981 – 2007) (without papal approval)
  - Bishop Adolph John Paschang, M.M. (柏增) (April 11, 1946 – February 3, 1968).In 1969, when a new primary school was set up in Lower Ngau Tau Kok Estate, Kowloon, Hong Kong, the school founding Supervisor, Fr. John M Mcloughlin, MM, named the school Bishop Paschang Memorial School, after Bishop Adolph John Paschang. The school has been relocated to Kowloon Bay and renamed Bishop Paschang Catholic School. Sponsoring body of Bishop Paschang Catholic School is still the Maryknoll Fathers in Hong Kong.
- Vicars Apostolic of Jiangmen 江門 (Roman Rite)
  - Bishop Adolph John Paschang, M.M. (柏增) (June 17, 1937 – April 11, 1946)
  - Bishop James Edward Walsh, M.M. (華理柱) (February 1, 1927 – July 1936). Bishop Walsh Memorial School was founded in 1963 in memory of the good work of Bishop Walsh, who upon his release by the Communist government on 10 July 1970, was the last Western missioner to be released.
