= Adolph John Paschang =

American Catholic bishop and missionary

The Most Reverend Adolph John Paschang MM
- Bishop of Jiangmen
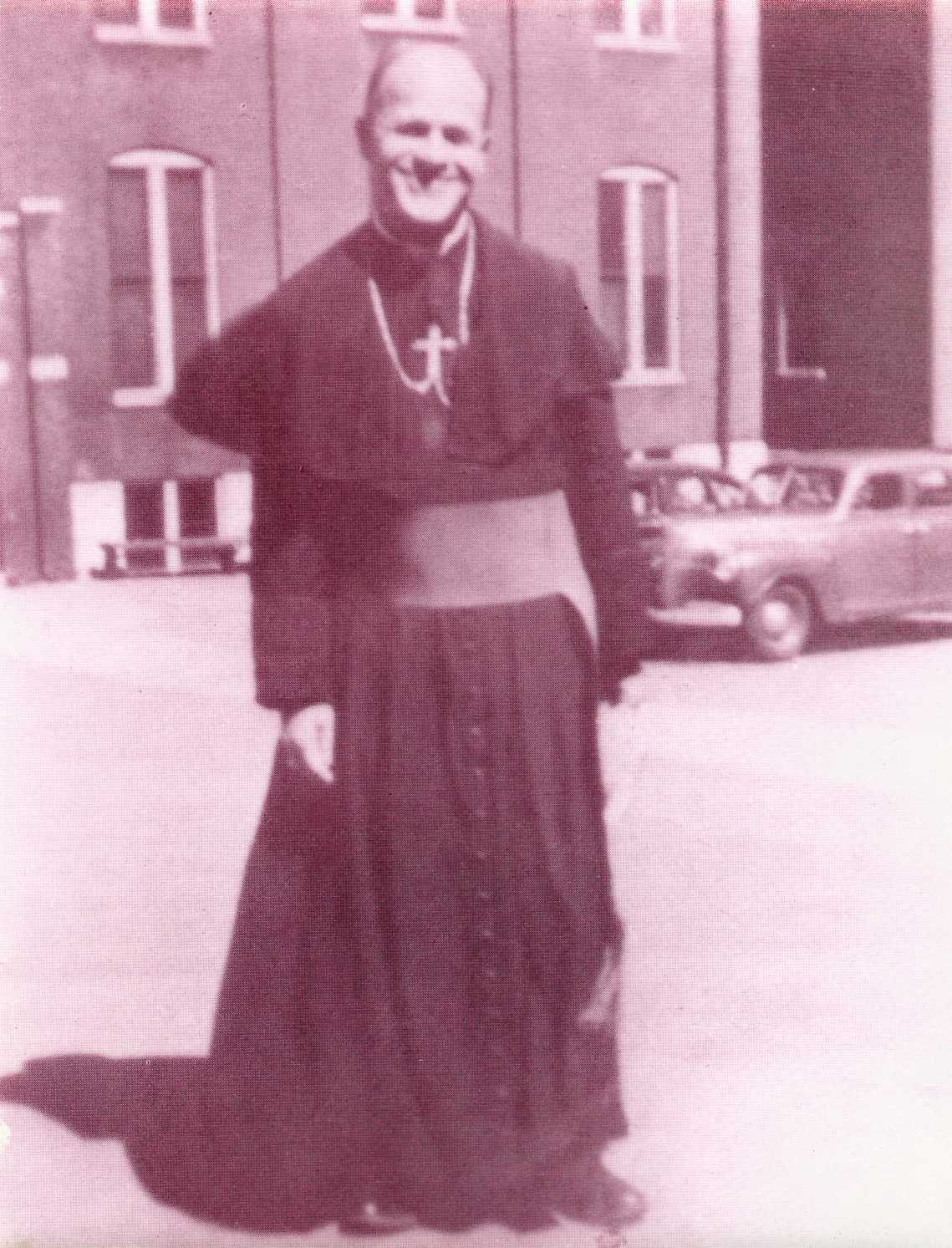
- Bishop Adolph Paschang in Jiangmen (1950)
- Church: Catholic Church
- Diocese: Diocese of Jiangmen
- In office: 17 June 1937 – 3 February 1968
- Predecessor: James Edward Walsh
- Successor: Peter Paul Li Pan-shi
- Previous post: Titular Bishop of Sasima (1937-1946)

Orders
- Ordination: 21 May 1921 by Patrick Joseph Hayes
- Consecration: 30 November 1937 by Francis Xavier Ford

Personal details
- Born: 16 April 1895 Martinsburg, Missouri, United States
- Died: 3 February 1968 (aged 72) Hong Kong, British Empire
- Buried: O71G, Ossarium G, St Michael's Catholic Cemetery, Happy Valley, Hong Kong
- Occupation: Missionary; bishop; priest; relief worker; educator
- Education: Kenrick Seminary

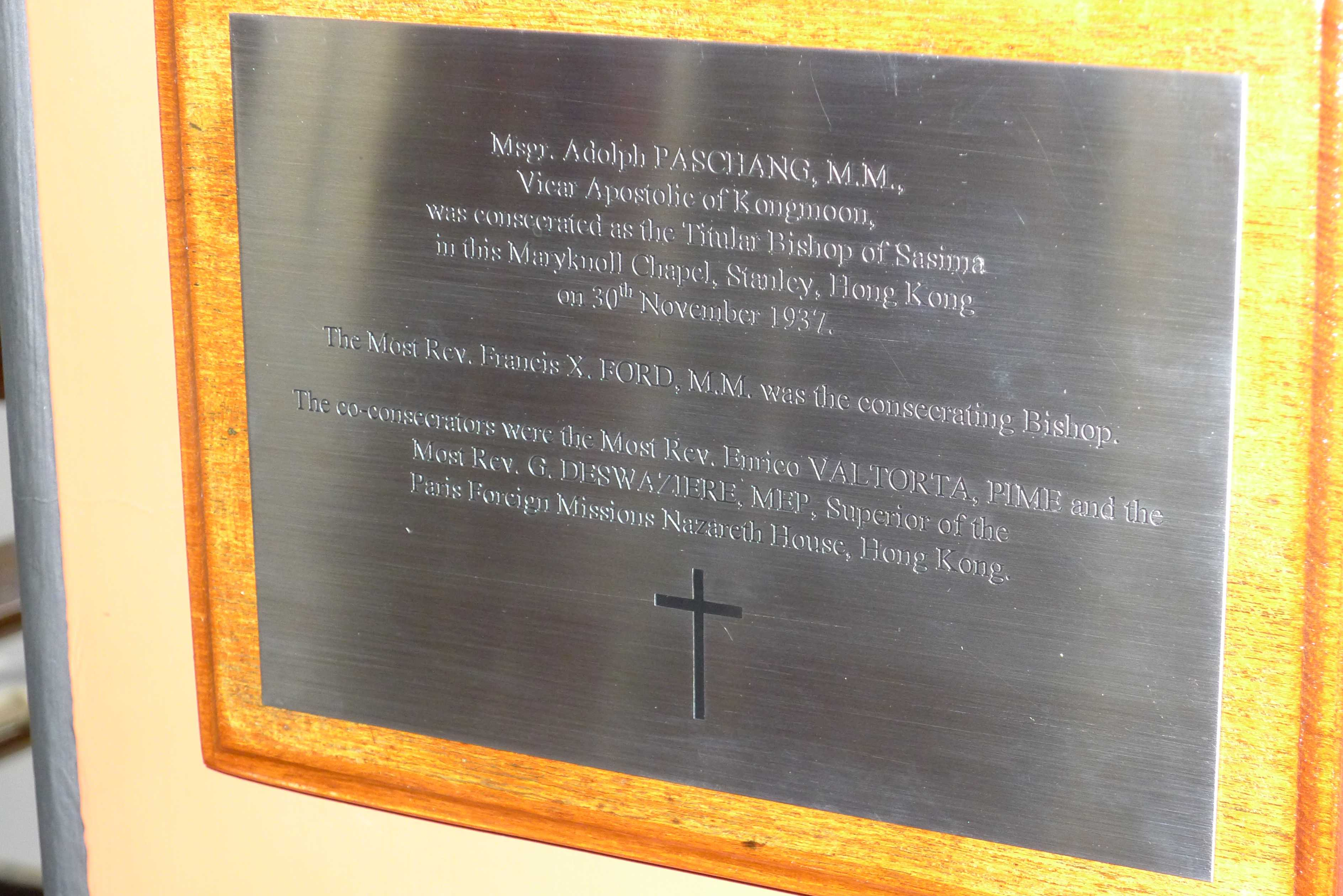
Monument commemorating consecration of Bishop Adolph John Paschang located in the Chapel of Maryknoll Stanley House in Hong Kong

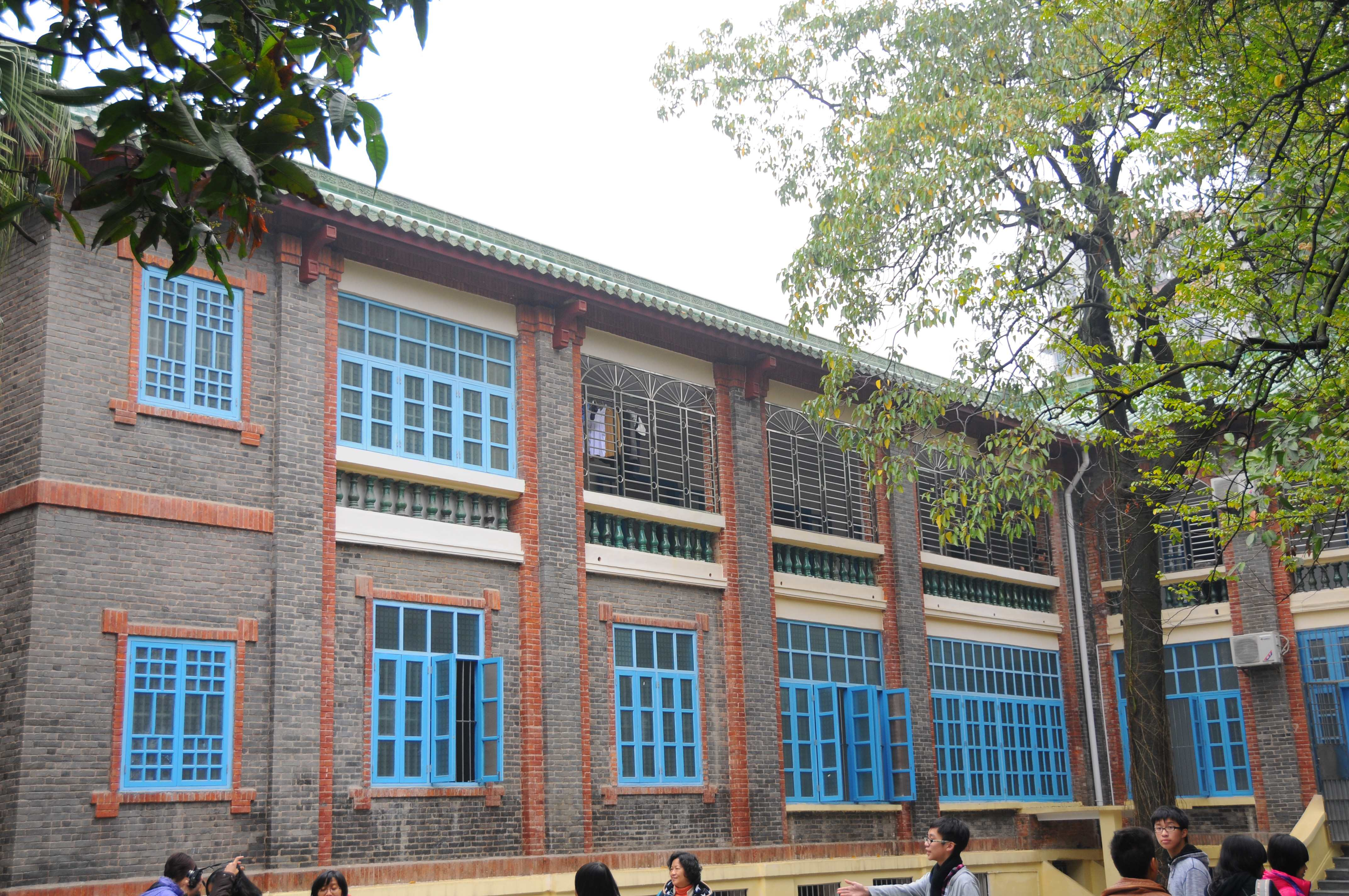
Immaculate Heart of Mary Cathedral in Jiangmen where Bishop Adolph J. Paschang used to serve. Photo taken on 19 March 2011

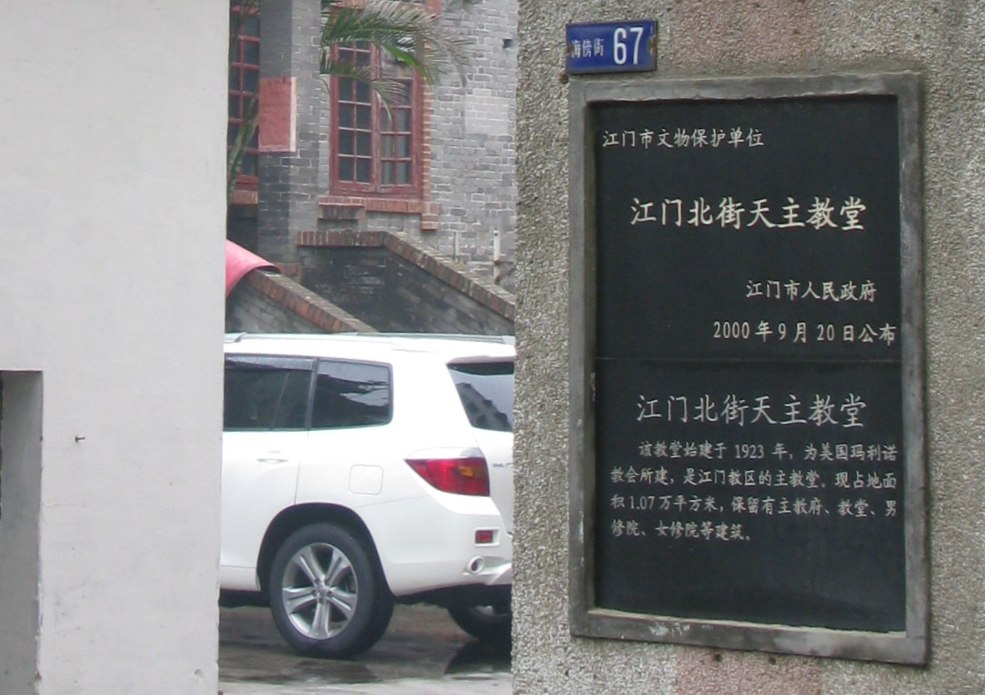
Sign at entrance to Immaculate Heart of Mary Cathedral, No.16 Hai Bang Road, Jiangmen. Photo taken on 19 March 2011

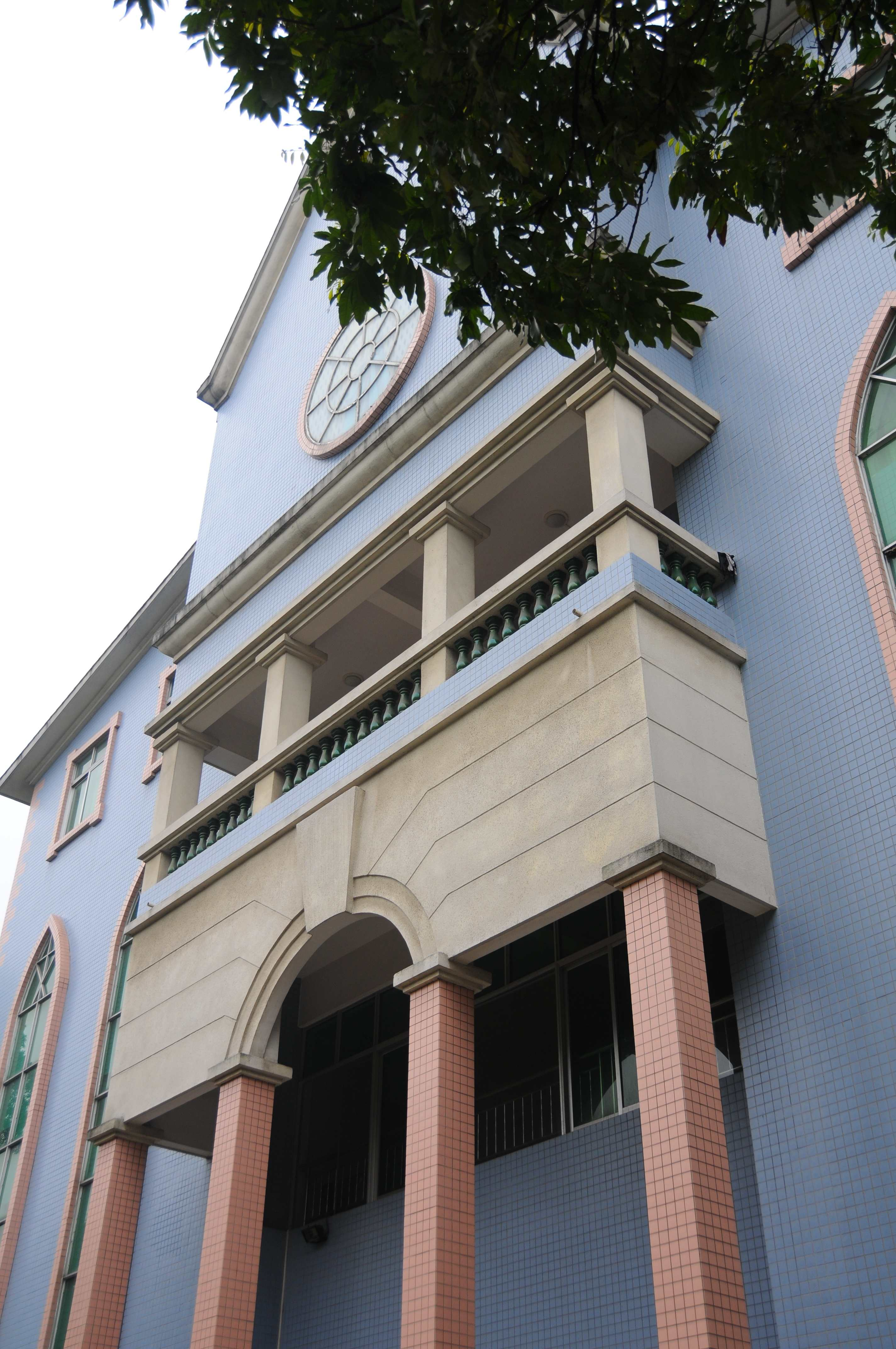
Immaculate Heart of Mary Cathedral in Jiangmen (previously known as Kongmoon) (江門). Photo taken on 19 March 2011

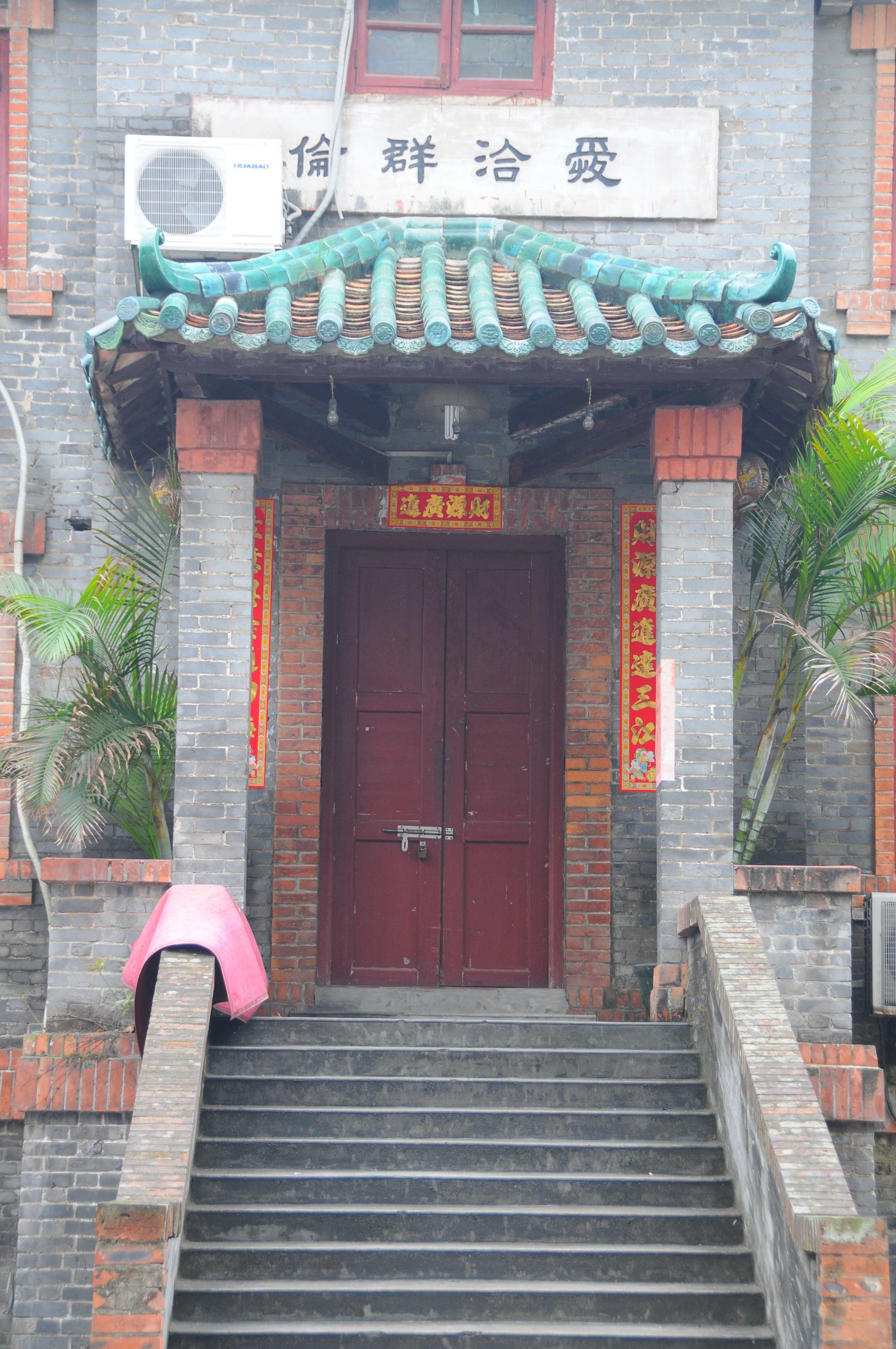
Immaculate Heart of Mary Cathedral in Jiangmen where Bishop A.J. Paschang once served as Bishop. Photo taken on 19 March 2011

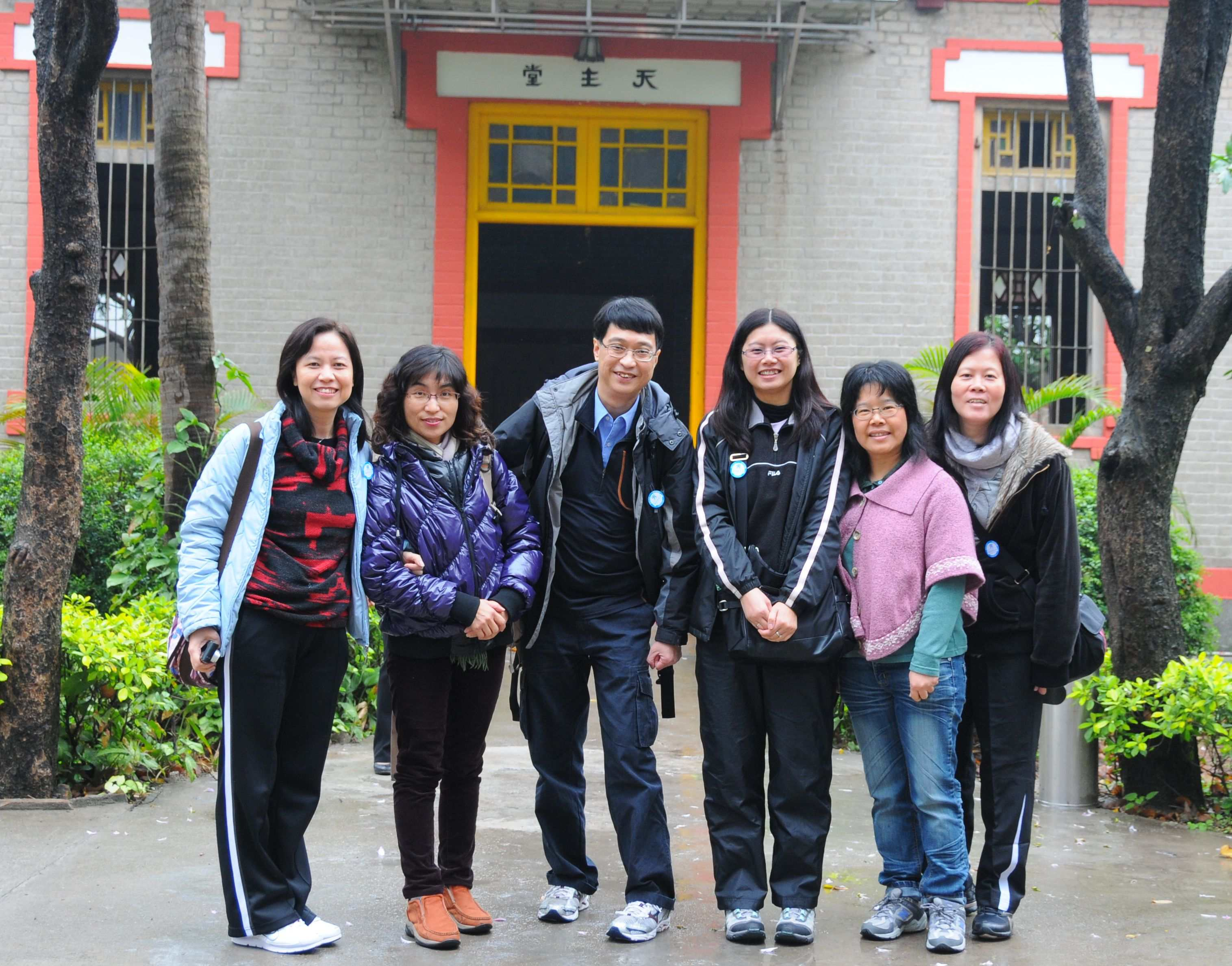
Photo of staff and alumni of Bishop Paschang Catholic School taken in the Immaculate Heart of Mary Cathedral in Jiangmen where Bishop A.J. Paschang once served as Bishop. Photo taken on 19 March 2011

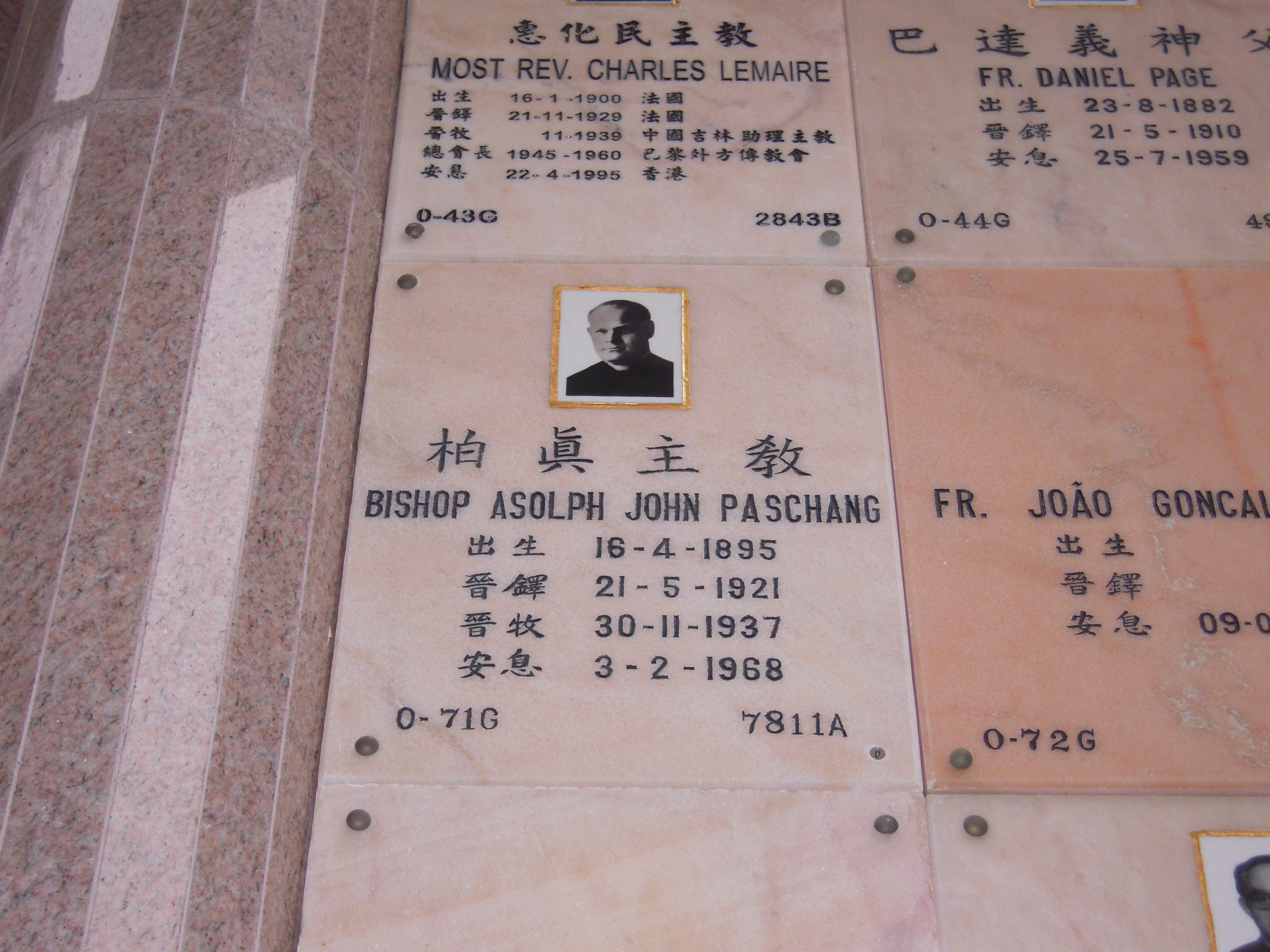
Resting place of Bishop Paschang, photo taken on 8 August 2011

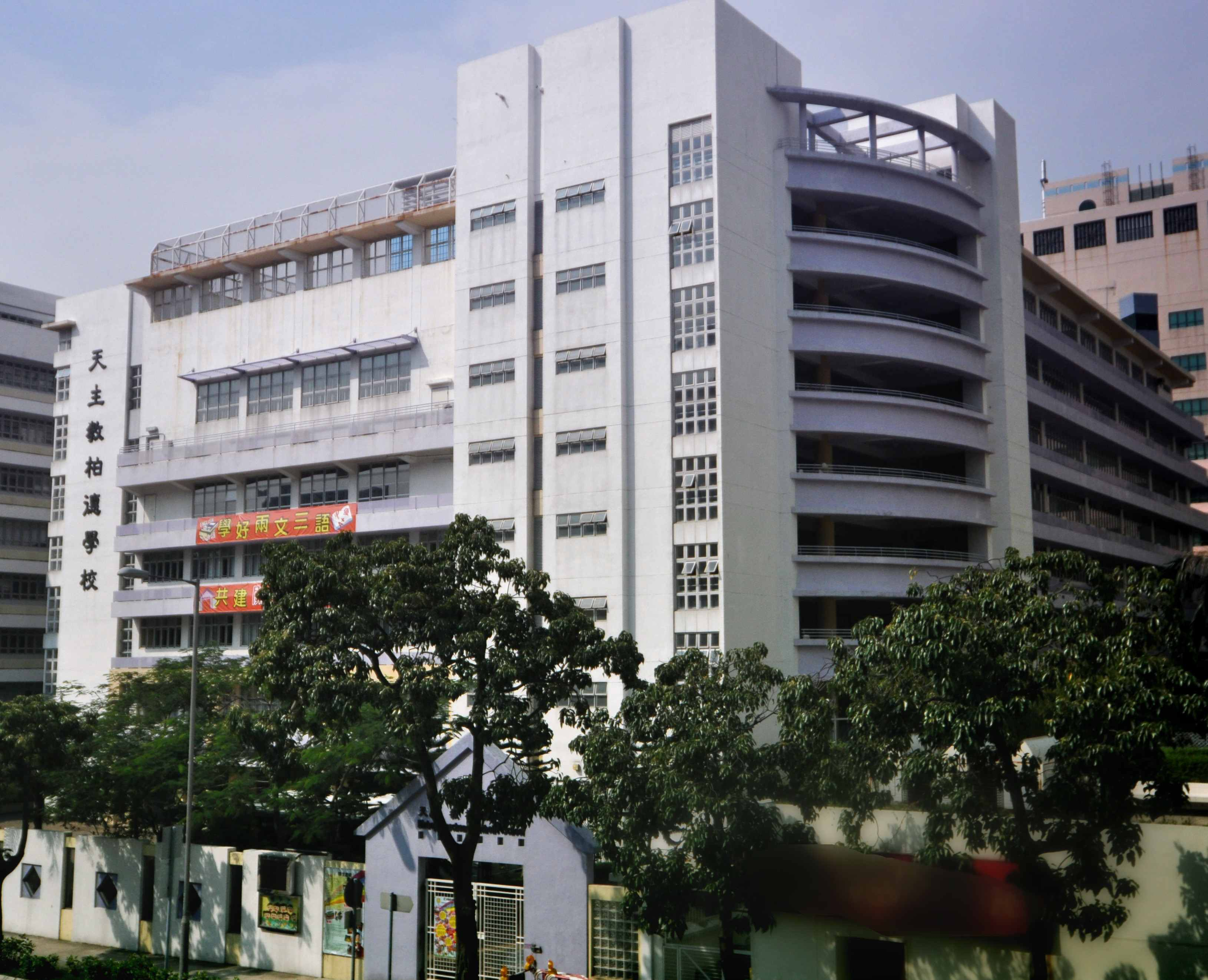
Bishop Paschang Catholic School in Kowloon Bay, Kowloon, Hong Kong

Adolph John Paschang, MM (Chinese: 柏增, 16 April 1895 – 3 February 1968) was an American Catholic prelate who served as Bishop of Jiangmen from 1946 until his death in 1968. He was a member of the Maryknoll Society and a relief worker and educator in southern China during the early 20th century.

== Early life ==
Adolph John Paschang was born in Martinsburg, Audrain County, Missouri. He grew up on a farm there, studied at Campion College of the Sacred Heart (1916; later Campion High School), then at St. Louis University High School in St. Louis, then at Kenrick Seminary in St. Louis. He joined the newly founded Catholic Foreign Mission Society of America, commonly known as the Maryknoll Fathers and Brothers, and was ordained a priest on 21 May 1921. After being ordained a priest, Paschang was immediately sent off to Kongmoon (now known as Jiangmen), China.

== Ministries ==
Paschang preached and worked in southern China, covering Gaozhou, previously known as Kochow. Specifically, Paschang worked in the Sacred Heart School in Gaozhou, Maoming, the second school ever founded by Maryknoll members in China, by Fr. Bernard F. Meyer with inauguration held on 5 October 1923. and first graduation on 1926 August 30. He also worked at Yangjiang (previously known as Yeungkong), Jiaying (previously known as Kaying) Taishan (previously known as Toishan) and Jiangmen. He was appointed vicar apostolic of Kongmoon on 17 June 1937, consecrated bishop on 30 November 1937, and later appointed Bishop of the Catholic Diocese of Jiangmen (previously known as Kongmoon) on 11 April 1946. He lived through the Japanese invasion and occupation of China in the Second World War.

=== Second World War ===
Japan invaded China in phases in the 1930s, gradually taking southern China towards the end of the decade. Until the attack on Pearl Harbor of 1941, Paschang and his diocese were relatively undisturbed by Japanese forces, given that he possessed American citizenship.

In February 1941, Paschang received a pass from the Japanese occupation forces to visit Hong Kong. The real purpose for his move was to leapfrog over into the unoccupied areas of his Diocese of Jiangmen in order to visit the priests and sisters.

During his stay in Hong Kong, Fr. Joe Sweeney from the Gate of Heaven Leprosarium in Ngaimen arrived, and recounted the adventurous journey he had just made: the motor launch carrying "Fr Big Joe" and other passengers had been attacked by a Japanese patrol boat towards evening, but they escaped capture as darkness descended and allowed them to slip unsighted past the patrol boat. Bishop Paschang would have to take the same route and the same risks on his return visitations. While Bishop Paschang was in Hong Kong, he performed the ordinations at the Dominican Rosary Hill chapel, in the absence of Bishop Enrico Valtorta.

In May 1946, Bishop Paschang arrived at Maryknoll Stanley House in Hong Kong for a conference with more than a dozen Ordinaries of South China, including the four Ordinaries of Maryknoll. He arrived with a van dyke beard – only his Episcopal rank saved him from the customary Stanley practice of insisting on the removal of beards.

=== Early years of Communist Rule ===
After the liberation of mainland China he chose to stay behind. He was captured and tortured by the Chinese Communist authorities.

- On 5 December 1951, Paschang was forced to contact Stanley House in Hong Kong on three times to relay information that the Chinese Communists were demanding US$22,000.
- On 7 December 1951, the ransom price was reduced to US$6,000, but nothing was paid.
- On 19 December 1951, similar news was reported in The New York Times: "December 18 An official Roman Catholic spokesman said today that a 56-year-old Bishop, the Most Rev. Adolph Paschang of Kongmoon (now called Jiangmen), Kwangtung Province (now named Guangdong Province), had been beaten again there following the church's refusal to pay "ransom money" to the Chinese Communists as a means of saving him from the violence of the intensified "land reform" in that southeastern coastal province.". *Bishop Paschang was subsequently severely tortured and broken as a person.

=== Release by the Communists to Hong Kong ===
Fr. William Downs in his Maryknoll Hong Kong Chronicle recorded on 9 June 1952, "Bishop Paschang, after (being) very badly treated ... was finally expelled from China". They marched Bishop Paschang "from his mission at Pakkai" (now called Beijie, where the Immaculate Heart of Mary Cathedral, i.e. cathedral of the Diocese of Jiangmen, was located), "placed him on a junk and sailed off – he did not know his destination and the thought of Father Sandy Cairns' unhappy ending at the hands of the Japanese must have crossed his mind".

- On 6 June 1952 Friday night, Paschang crossed the Chinese border into Portuguese Macao.
- On 9 June 1952, he finally reached Hong Kong. Many reporters anxiously awaited him at the Hong Kong Pier. Upon arrival, Bishop Adolph Paschang recalled that he had been made to kneel on broken bricks in the winter of 1951.

== Later life ==
After his expulsion by the Communist Chinese government, Bishop Paschang stayed in the Maryknoll Stanley House, headquarters of the Maryknoll Fathers and Brothers in Hong Kong, visited the States briefly, but again returned to Hong Kong out of his love of the Chinese people.

- In March 1957, Bishop Paschang suffered a severe cerebral thrombosis, and was hospitalized. He was thereafter no longer able to walk. The Canossian Sisters' St. Francis Hospital in Wan Chai became his home for the best part of a year.
- In October 1957, Paschang insisted on leaving the hospital, and returned to Maryknoll Stanley House. Arrangements were made after a meeting with the visiting Superior General, Father John Comber, and a storeroom on the ground floor next to the kitchen was transformed into a "suite" for him. He was in the tender, if non-professional, care of faithful houseboy Ah Fung.
- In May 1958, he was finally constrained to use a wheelchair. Despite his delibilities, he continued to attend Mass regularly and assist in church services as far as his ailing body allowed.
- On 3 February 1968, Bishop Paschang died in St. Paul's Hospital in Causeway Bay, Hong Kong.

== Memorial ==
In memory of Paschang, when a new primary school was founded by the Maryknollers in Ngau Tau Kok, Kowloon, in 1969, it was named Bishop Paschang Memorial School, which is now known as Bishop Paschang Catholic School.

In the late 1990s, the Hong Kong SAR Government planned to re-develop the Lower Ngau Tau Kok Estate, where Bishop Paschang Memorial School was situated. In 1997, the headmaster at that time, Leung Kwok Hung, applied for a new school premises from the government and was given a new school building in a "school village" in Kowloon Bay. AM section of Bishop Paschang Memorial School moved to the new campus in Kowloon Bay in 2002. The new school was named Bishop Paschang Catholic School.

The school building of Bishop Paschang Memorial School was finally handed back to the government of Hong Kong in 2008, in line with the plan of demolishing the then remaining portion of the Lower Ngau Tau Kok Estate. The remaining classes of the PM section of Bishop Paschang Memorial School were relocated to Bishop Paschang Catholic School in Kowloon Bay as well.

== See also ==
- Maryknoll
- Roman Catholic Diocese of Jiangmen
- Bishop Paschang Catholic School

Catholic Church titles
Preceded by James Edward Walsh	Bishop of Jiangmen; 1937—1968	Succeeded by Li Pan Shi (consecrated in 1981)
