= Bishop Paschang Catholic School =

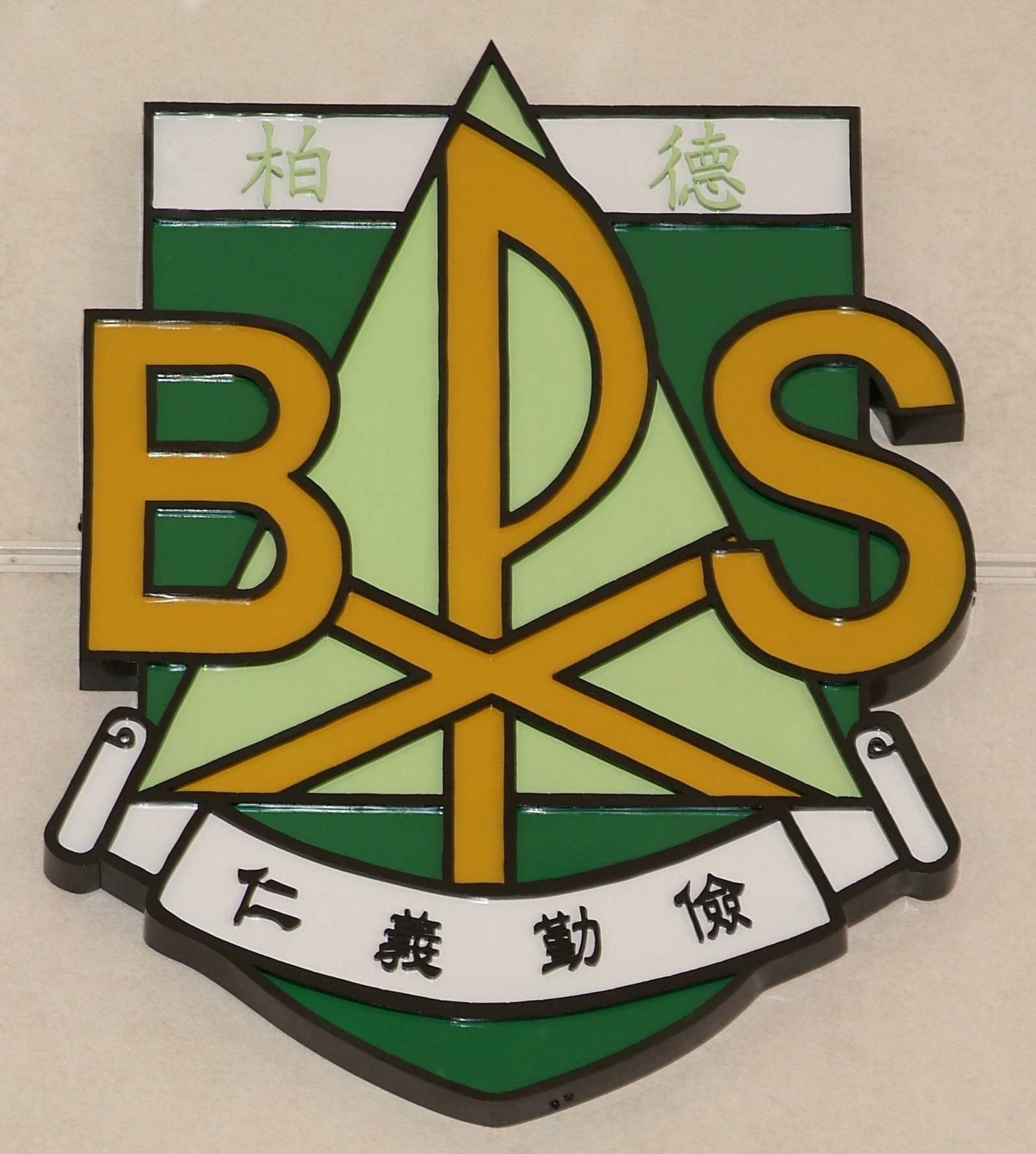

Location
- No. 6 Wang Chiu Road, Kowloon Bay, Kowloon, Hong Kong, China; 22°19′43″N 114°12′29″E

Information
- Type: Hong Kong SAR aided school
- Motto: Patience, Justice, Diligence, and Thriftiness. (in Chinese)仁義勤儉
- Religious affiliation: Roman Catholic
- Established: 1969
- President: Anthony Vincent Brennan
- Principal: Tong Kwok Man (唐國敏)
- Faculty: about 50 teachers
- Enrollment: about 800 pupils
- Language: Chinese
- Website: http://bpcs.edu.hk

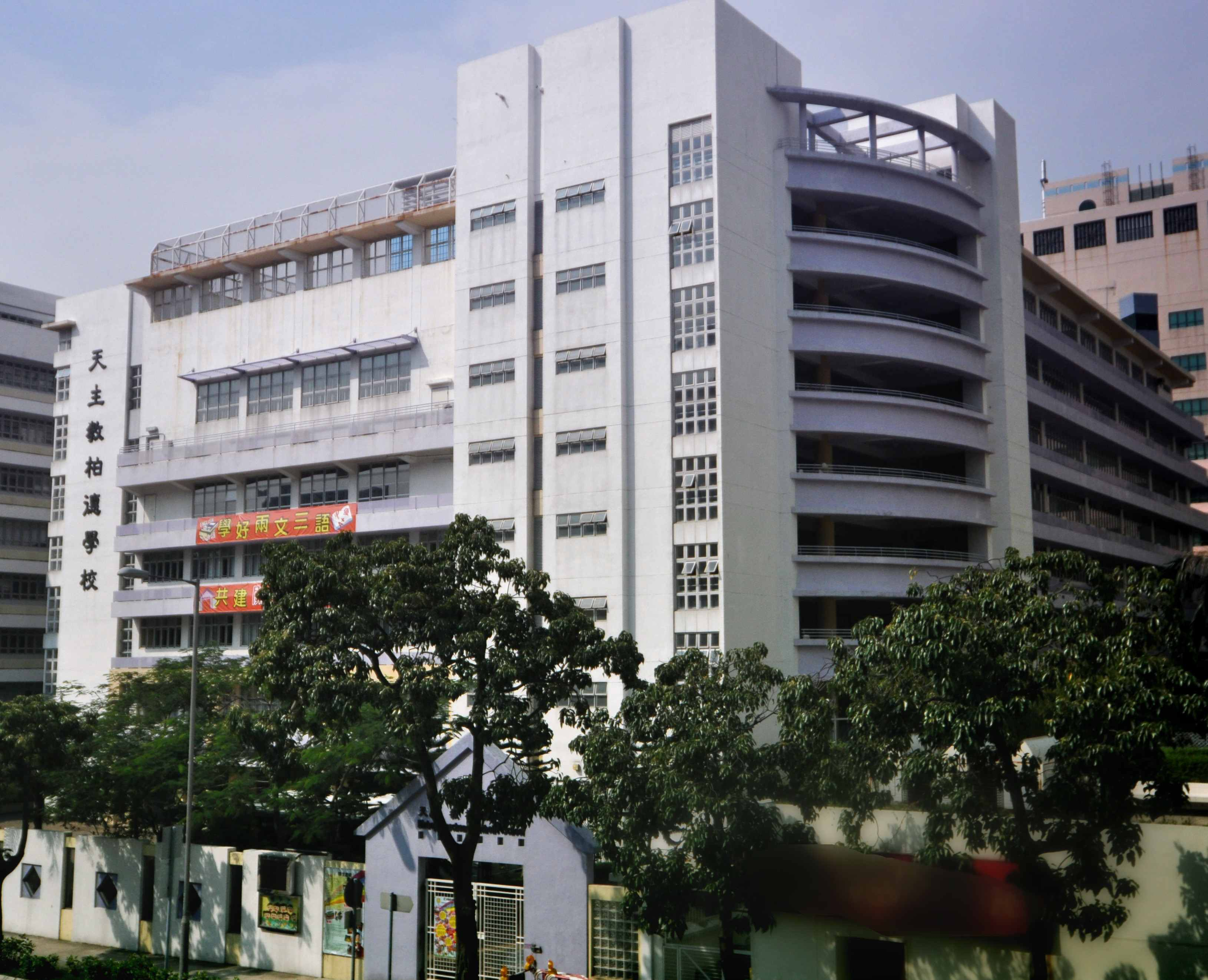
Outlook of Bishop Paschang Catholic School in Kowloon Bay

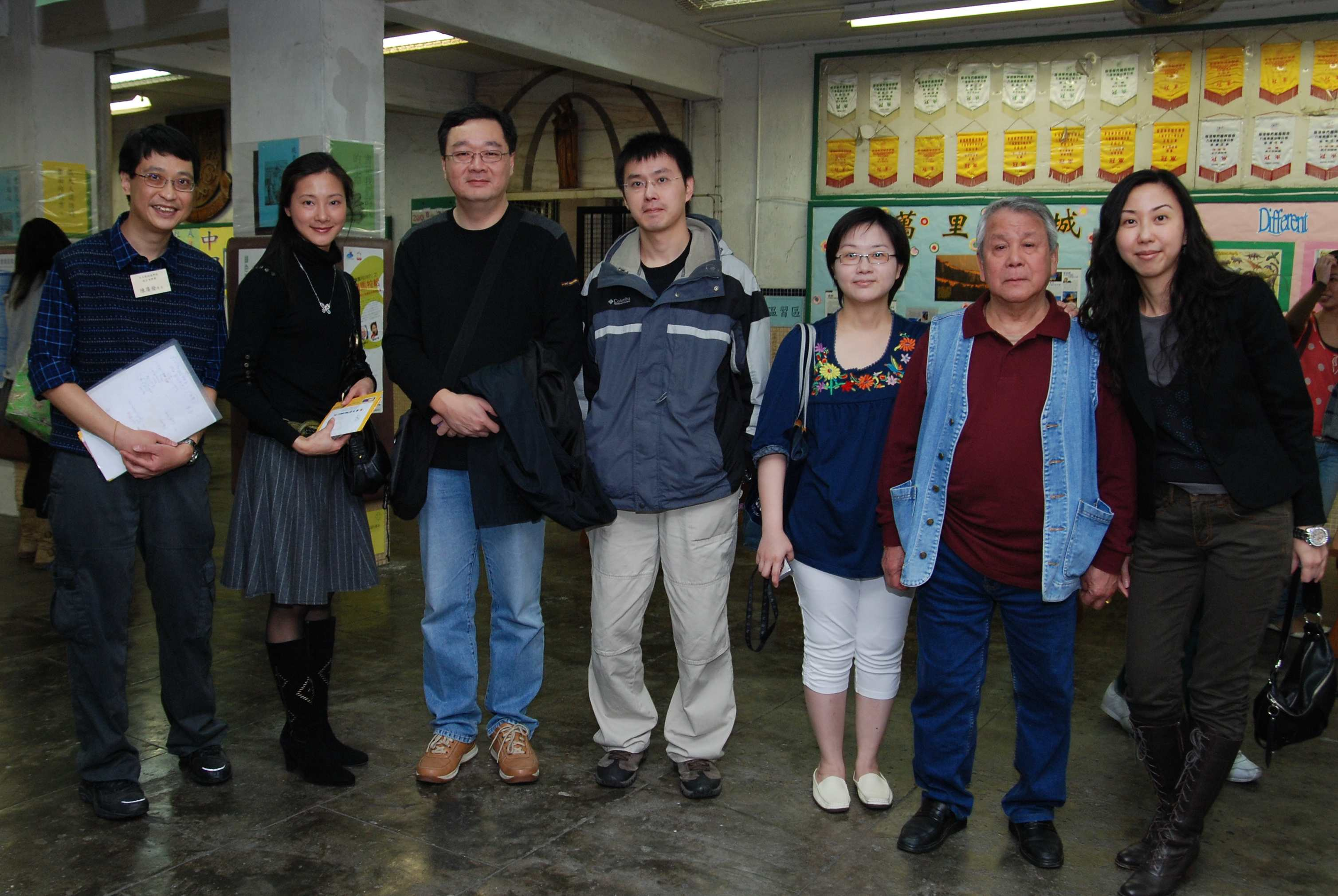
Ho Ka Lai, siblings and alumni

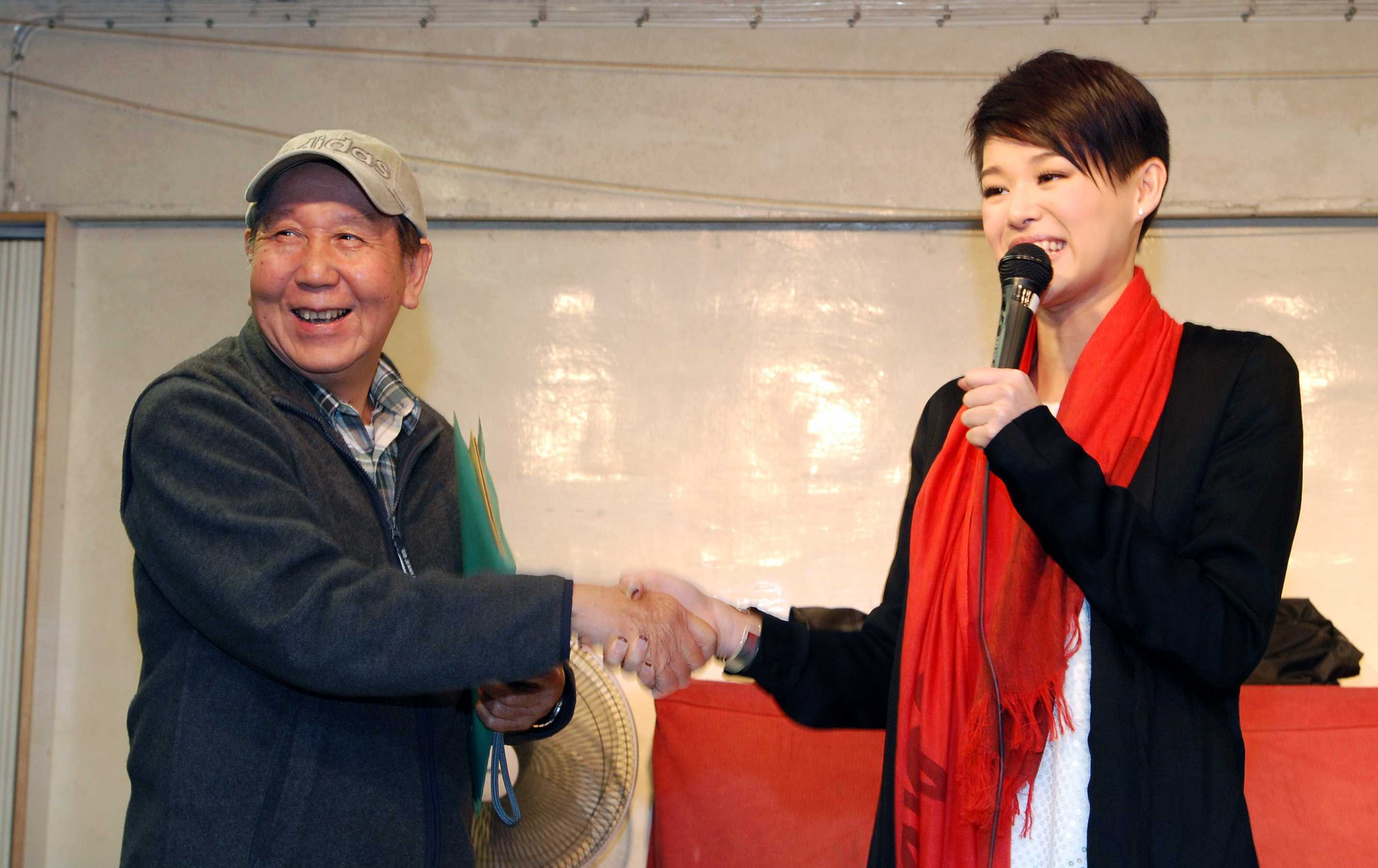
Myolie Wu and her P6 class master Poon Wai Ki

Bishop Paschang Catholic School (Chinese: 天主教柏德學校) is a government-aided, whole day Roman Catholic coeducational primary school located in Kowloon Bay, Kowloon, Hong Kong.

The school is in Primary One Admission Net 46 of Kwun Tong. With the exception of English and Mandarin lessons, the school employs Cantonese as the main medium of instruction, in line with the prevailing education policy set by the Hong Kong government. This school is generally considered as the best primary school in the area of Kowloon Bay and Ngau Tau Kok. The sponsoring body was formerly the Catholic Foreign Mission Society of America, commonly known as the Maryknoll Fathers. Since September 2023, the Catholic Diocese of Hong Kong has taken over as the sponsoring body.

== History ==
The school was founded by the Maryknoll Fathers in 1969. The Bishop Walsh School was founded by the Maryknoll Fathers in Hong Kong in 1963. When Bishop Paschang Memorial School was set up in 1969, some senior staff were transferred from Bishop Walsh School.

=== Timeline ===
- 1969 founded – Bishop Paschang Catholic School was formerly known as the "Bishop Paschang Memorial School", originally located in Lower Ngau Tau Kok Estate. It was founded by John M. McLoughlin. Initially, there was one morning section and onea evening section. McLoughlin named the school after Maryknoller Adolph John Paschang.
- 1971 – First Primary 6 graduation of the morning section
- 1972 – First Primary 6 graduation of the evening section
- 1975 – First batch of pupils who studied from P1 up to P6 graduated in 1975
- 1979 – 10th anniversary
- 1999 – Parents-Teachers Association founded
- 2002 – Morning section of Bishop Paschang Memorial School moved to the campus in Kowloon Bay, became a full day school and was renamed Bishop Paschang Catholic School. The new campus was situated next to Richland Gardens, opposite the Kai Yip Estate, of Y2K design by the Architectural Services Department of HKSAR government. PM section of Bishop Paschang Memorial School stayed in Ngau Tau Kok but became a full day school.
- 2003 – SARS outbreak in Amoy Gardens, Ngau Tau Kok.
- 2006 – Incorporated Management Committee founded according to the Section 40BU of the Education Ordinance
- 2007 – Alumni Association founded
- 2008 – All remaining classes of Bishop Paschang Memorial School were relocated to Bishop Paschang Catholic School in Kowloon Bay. A 39th anniversary special memorial booklet commemorated this event. The campus in Ngau Tau Kok was returned to the HKSAR government and was subsequently demolished together with the rest of the Lower Ngau Tau Kok Estate. The migration was complete. The newer campus was opened to the public on 8 March and 20 July 2008. Lower Ngau Tau Kok Estate was the last of its kind of resettlement estate built by the Hong Kong Government. Its demolition aroused much nostalgia.

== Description ==
Bishop Paschang Catholic School is a government aided school, started to adopt small class teaching. Starting from 2010, the school enrolled five primary one classes, totalling 125 pupils each year. Most pupils are from neighbourhood families. As of 2011 enrolment had reached about 800 pupils. Graduates became doctors, lawyers, accountants, pharmacists, professors, principals, teachers, professional athletes, actors, administrative officers and engineers.

The school employed an expert in curriculum design, Chan Mei Hing, in 2009 to succeed the retiring headmaster, Au Wing Cheung. Besides the supervisor and the headmistress, the Incorporated Management Committee (2010–2012) consisted of Fr. Thomas A. Peyton, Joseph Lai, Lee Ping Hing, Au Wing Cheung, Martin Lai, Rosa Chan, Priscilla Ko, Stefy Wong, Yip Miu Yee, and K.F. Chan.

== Supervisors ==
- John M. McLoughlin (1969–1980)
- Peter Alphonsus Reilly (1980–1994)
- Howard D. Trube (1994–1995)
- Thomas Anthony Peyton (1995–2004)
- Anthony Vincent Brennan (2004 – 2012)
- Martin Lai Wing-chun
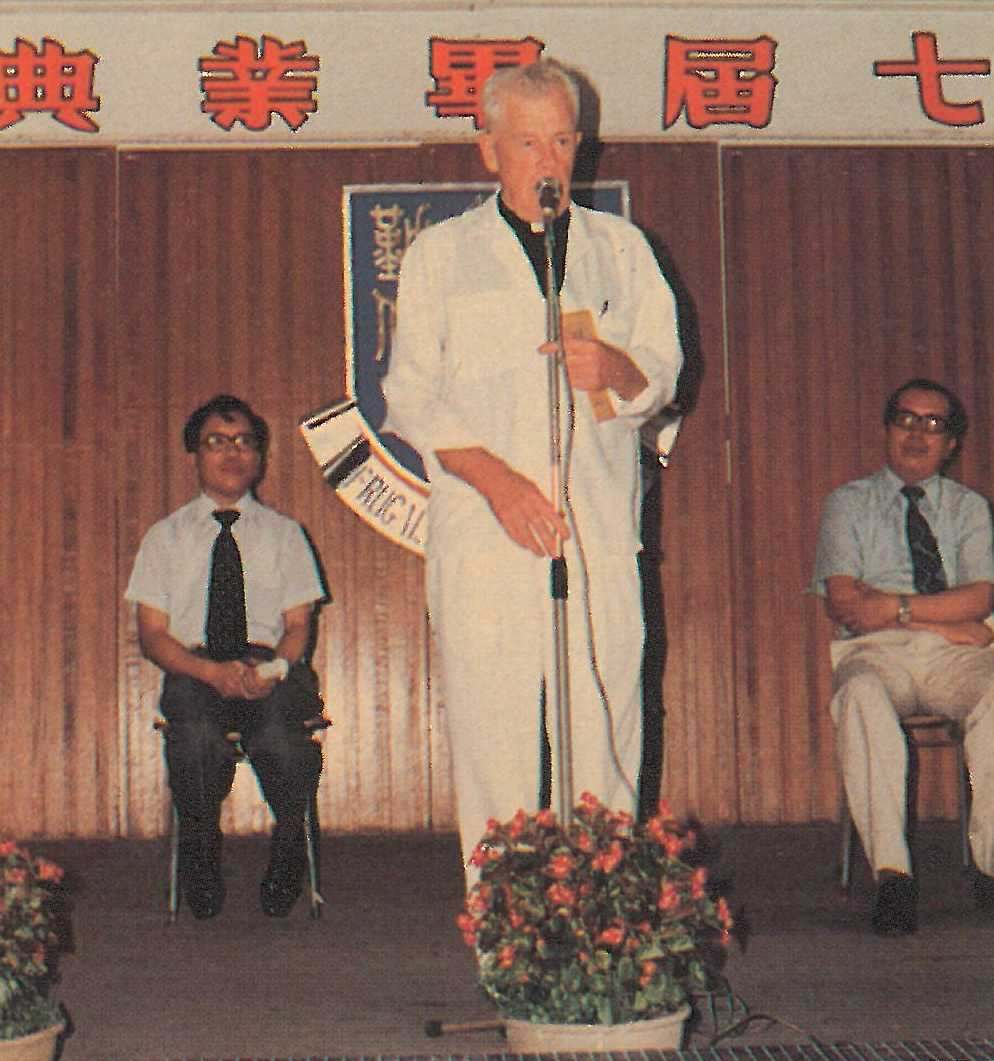
John McLoughlin, founding supervisor of Bishop Paschang Memorial School

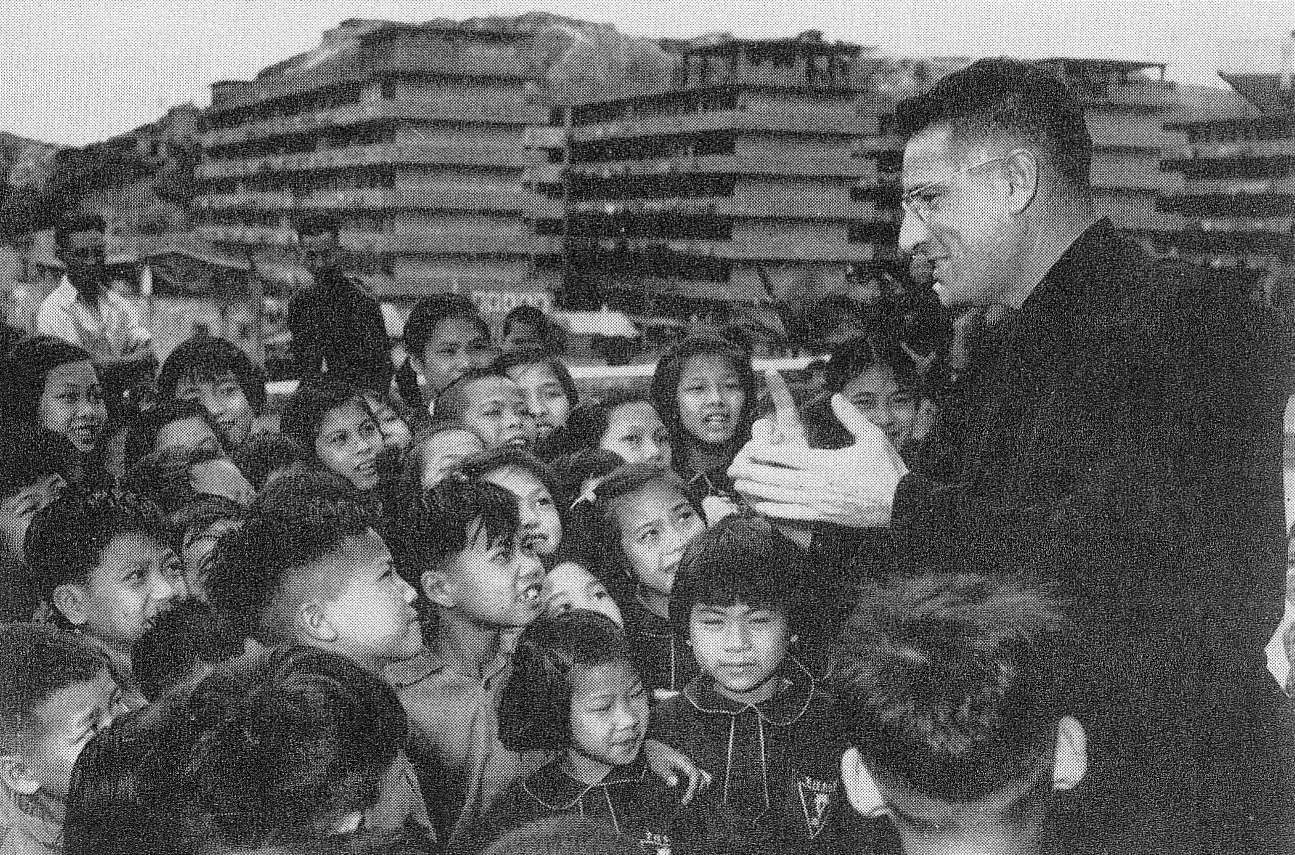
Peter Reilly

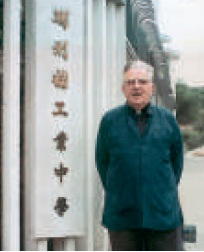
Howard D. Trube

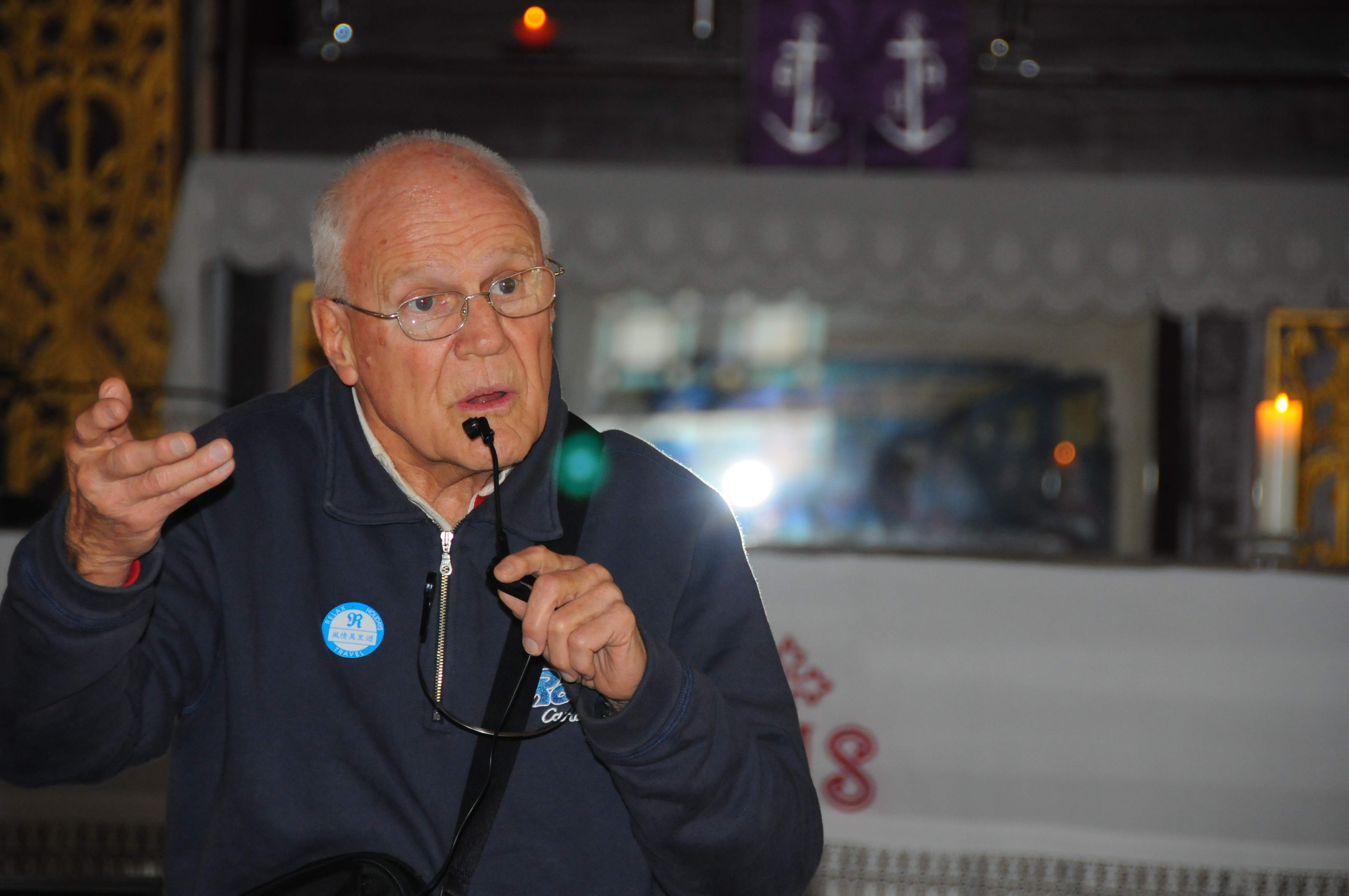
Thomas Anthony Peyton

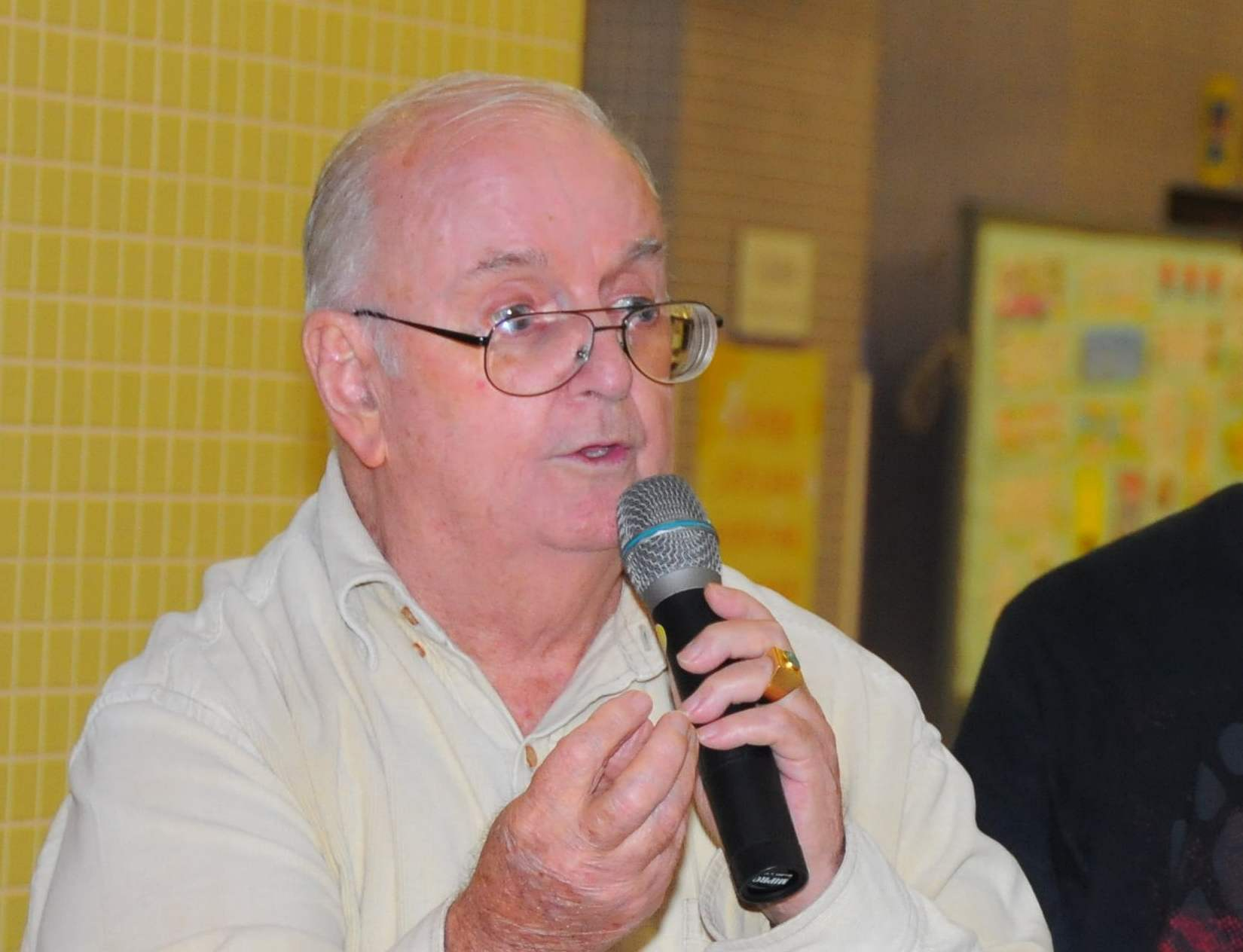
Anthony Vincent Brennan

== Headmasters ==
Headmasters of Bishop Paschang Memorial School AM Section in Ngau Tau Kok

- Chan Man Wai (1969–1984)
- Yeung Yuen Man (1984–1992)
- Leung Kwok Hung (1992–2001)
- Lee Ping Hing (2001–2002)

AM section moved to Kowloon Bay in 2002 and became a full day school.

Headmasters of Bishop Paschang Memorial School PM Section in Ngau Tau Kok

- Lau Neng Chung (1969–1976)
- Lee Tai Chung (1976–1991)
- Leung Kwok Hung (1991–1992)
- Sun Leung Shek (1992–1996)
- Lee Ping Hing (1996–2001)
- Au Wing Cheung (2001–2002)

PM section of Bishop Paschang Memorial School became full day school in 2002.

Headmasters of Bishop Paschang Memorial School Full Day School in Ngau Tau Kok

- Au Wing Cheung (2002–2006)
- Au Suk Yan (2006–2008)

Full day school of Bishop Paschang Memorial School was merged with Bishop Paschang Catholic School in Kowloon Bay in 2008.

Headmasters of Bishop Paschang Catholic School in Kowloon Bay

- Lee Ping Hing (2002–2006)
- Au Wing Cheung (2006–2009)
- Chan Mei Hing (2009–2021)
- Tong Kwok Man (2021–)
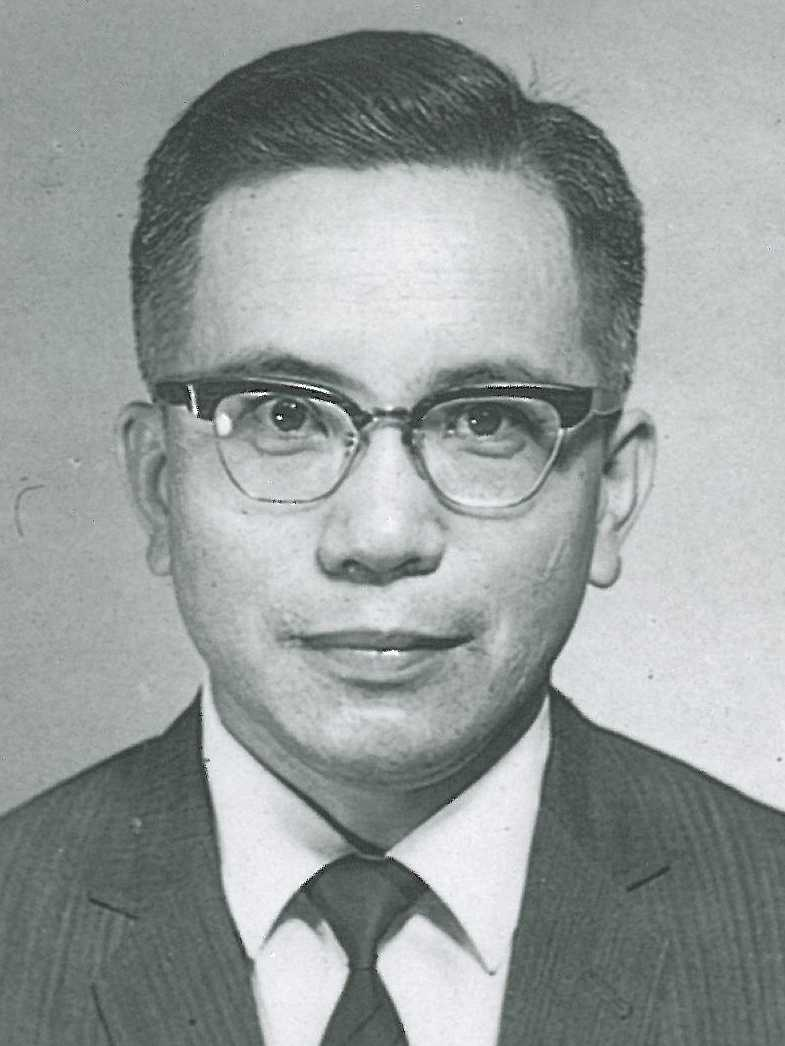
Chan Man Wai

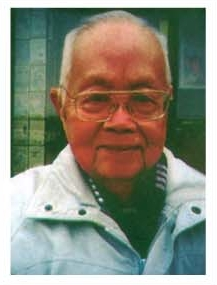
Lau Neng Chung

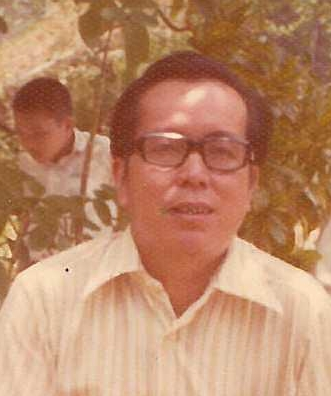
Lee Tai Chung

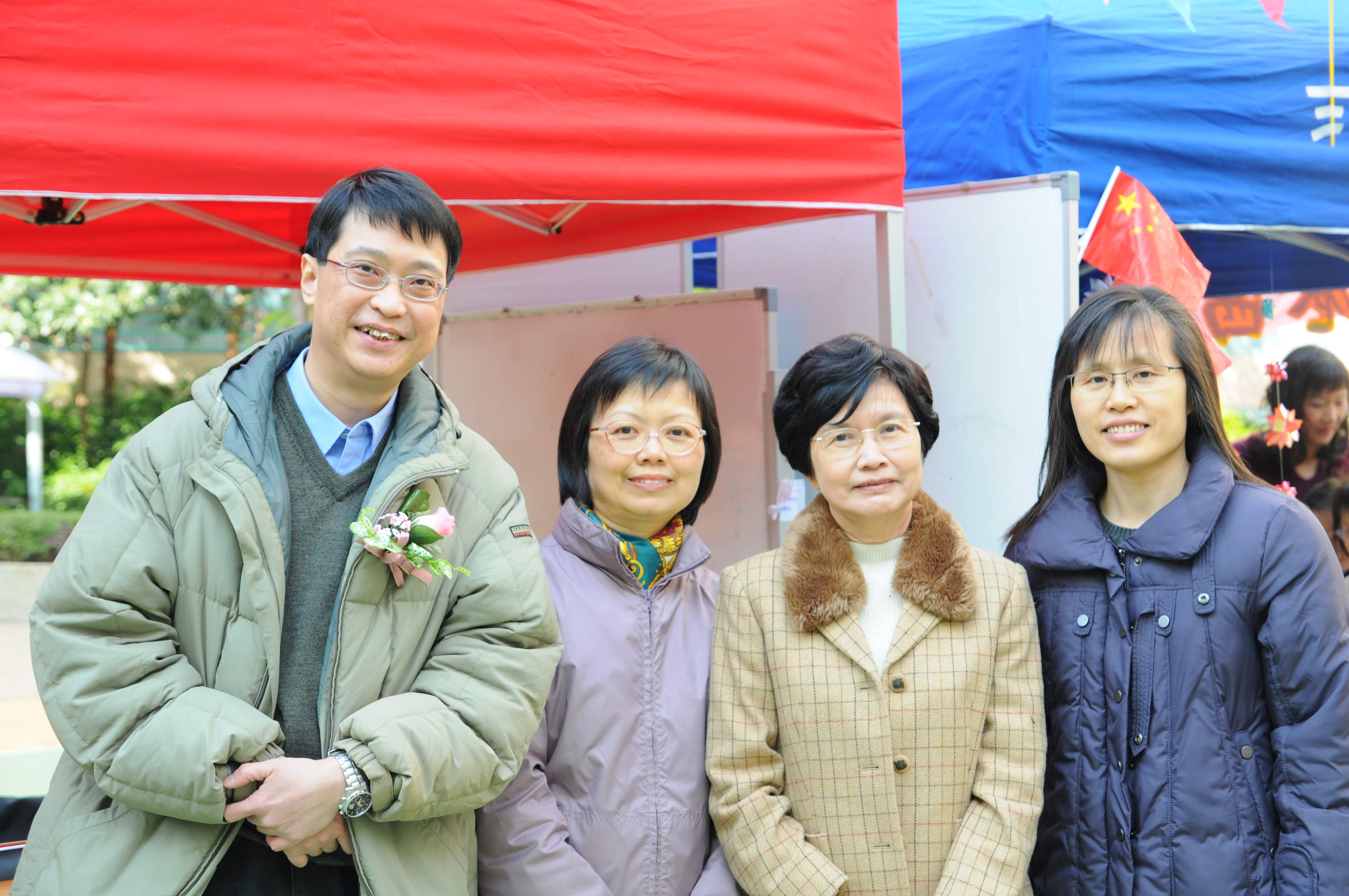
Yeung Yuen Man (in beige jacket)

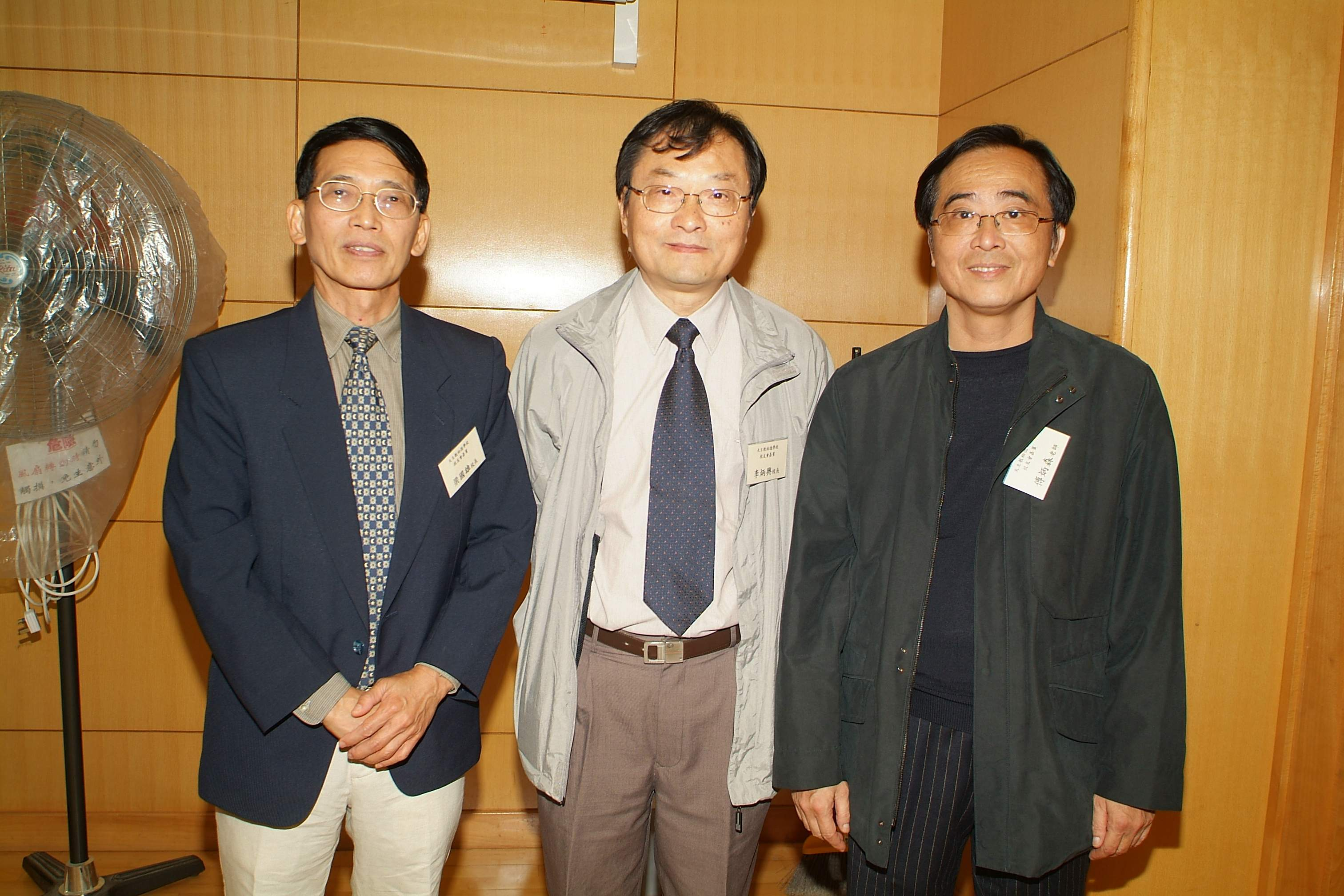
Leung Kwok Hung(in navy blue jacket), Lee Ping Hing and Martin Fu

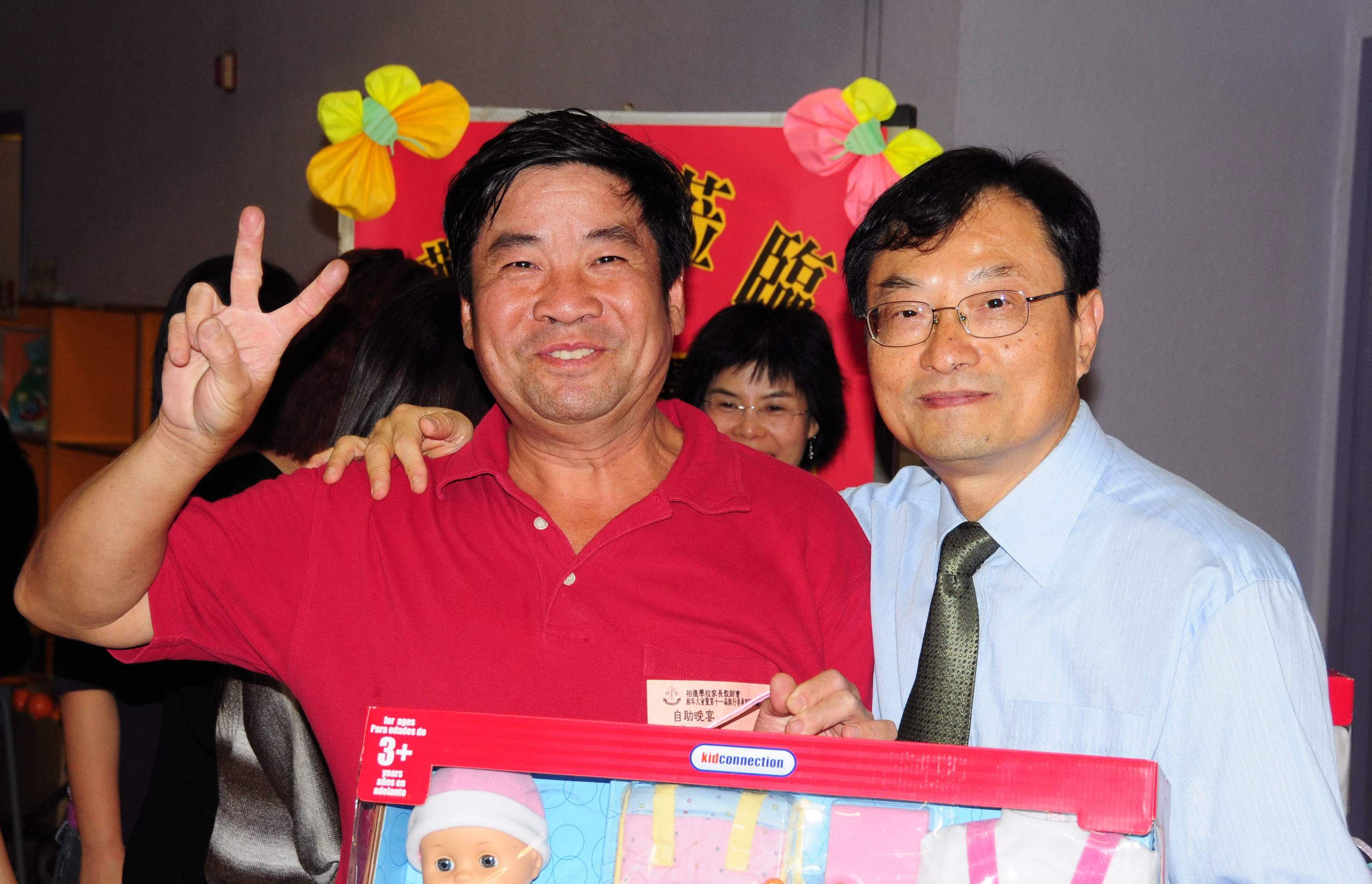
Lee Ping Hing and Ng Kwok Fai

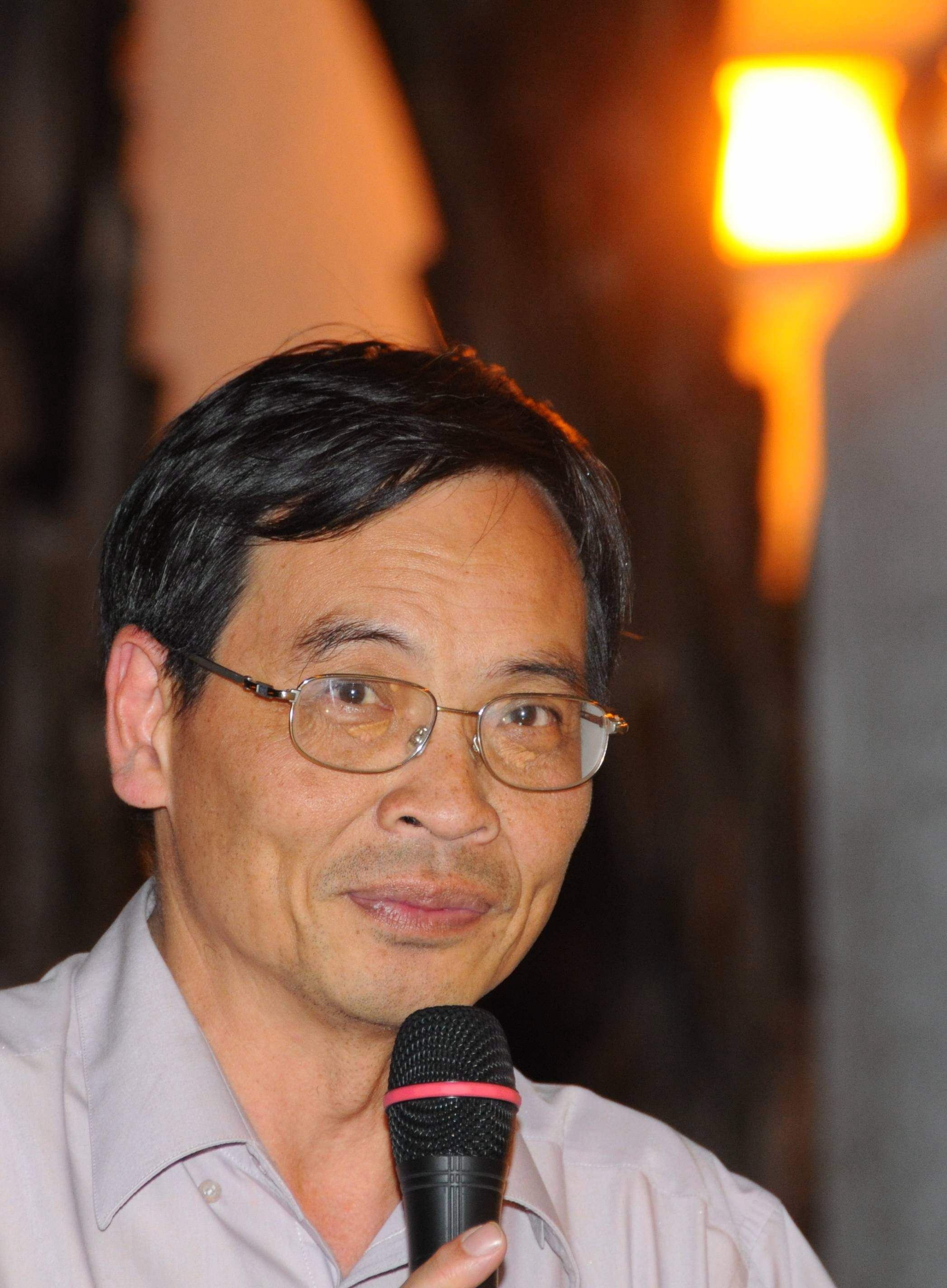
Au Wing Cheung (Deceased)

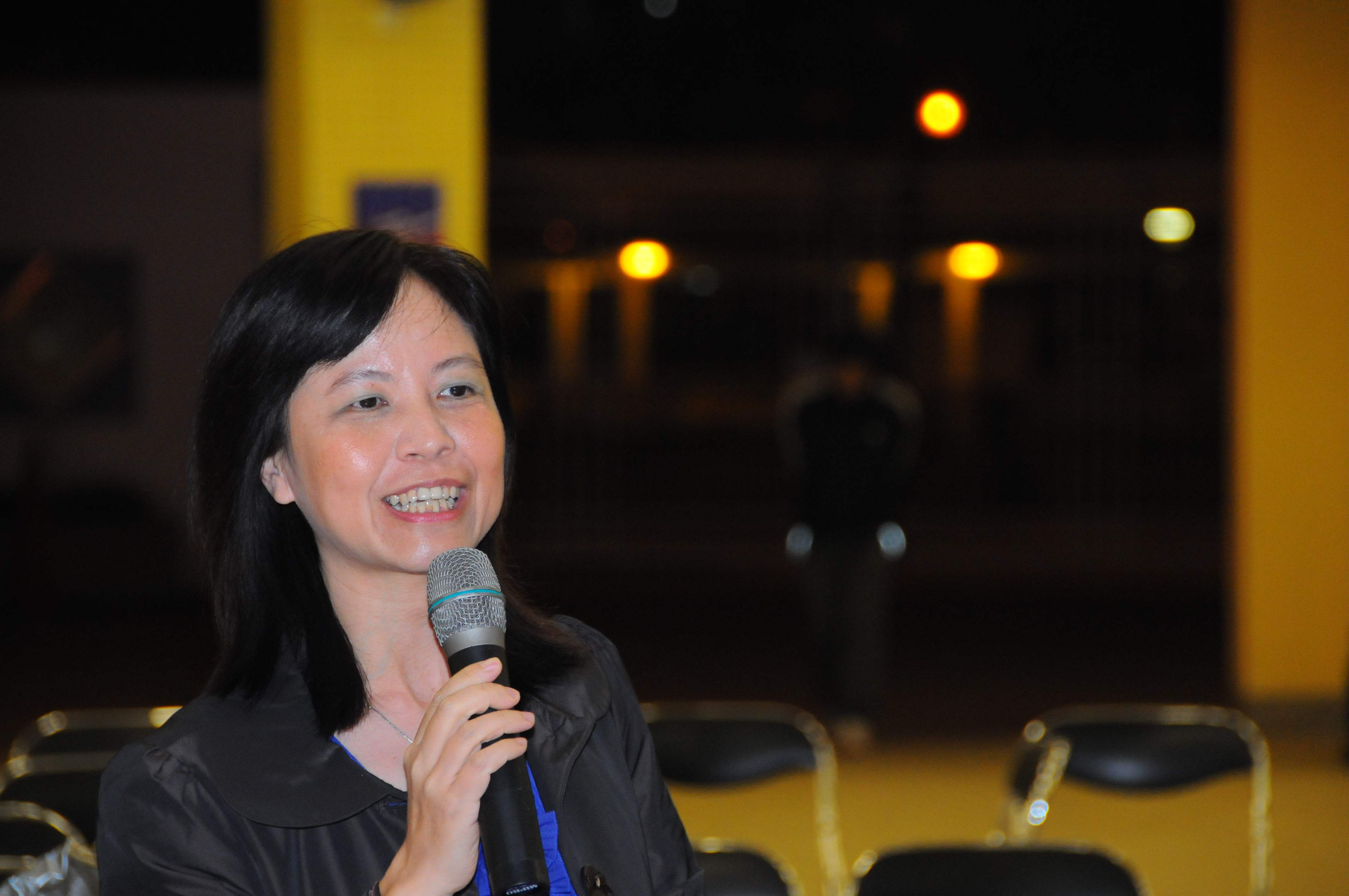
Chan Mei Hing

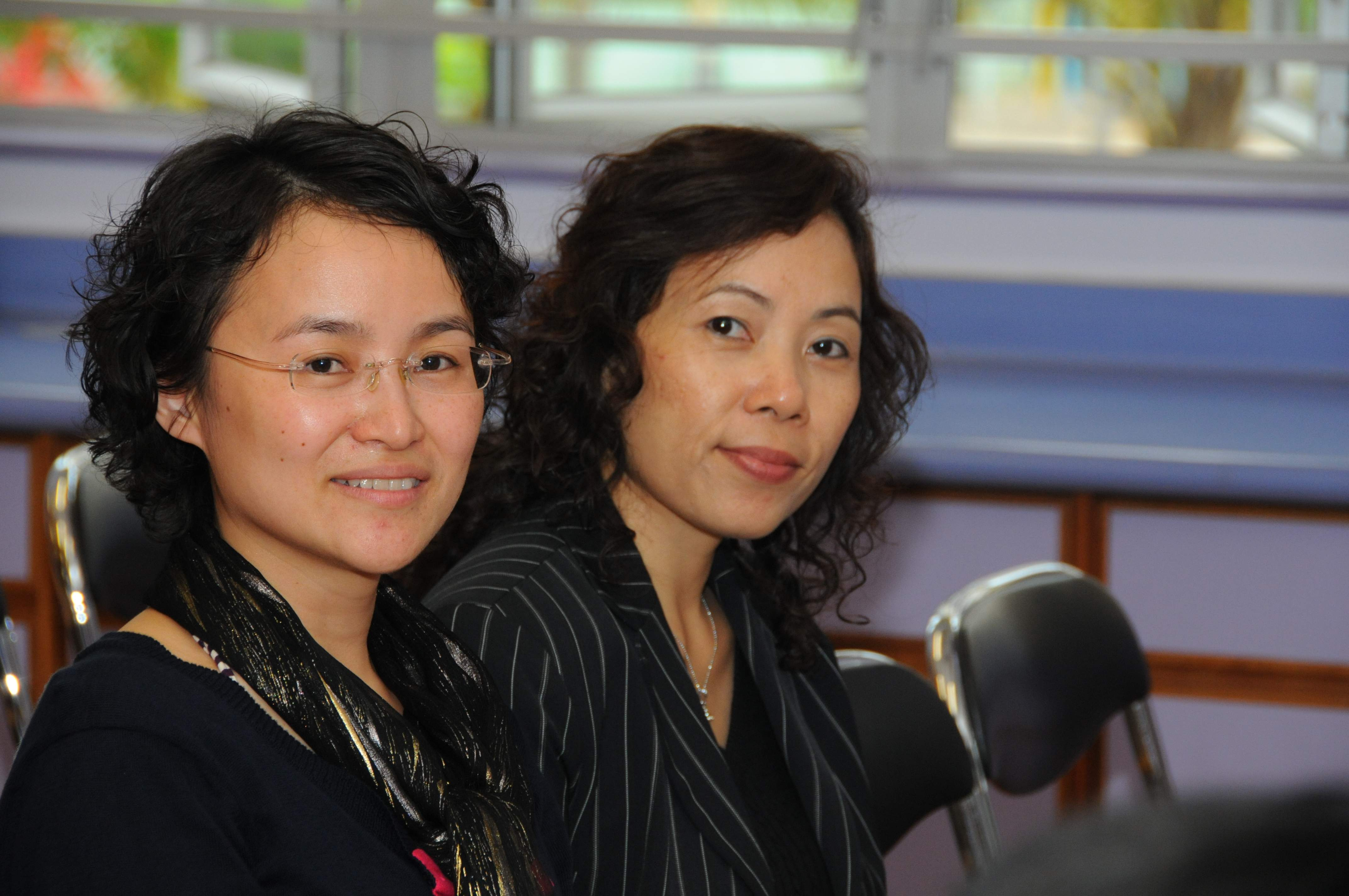
Au Suk Yan and Ho Kat Yim (with glasses)

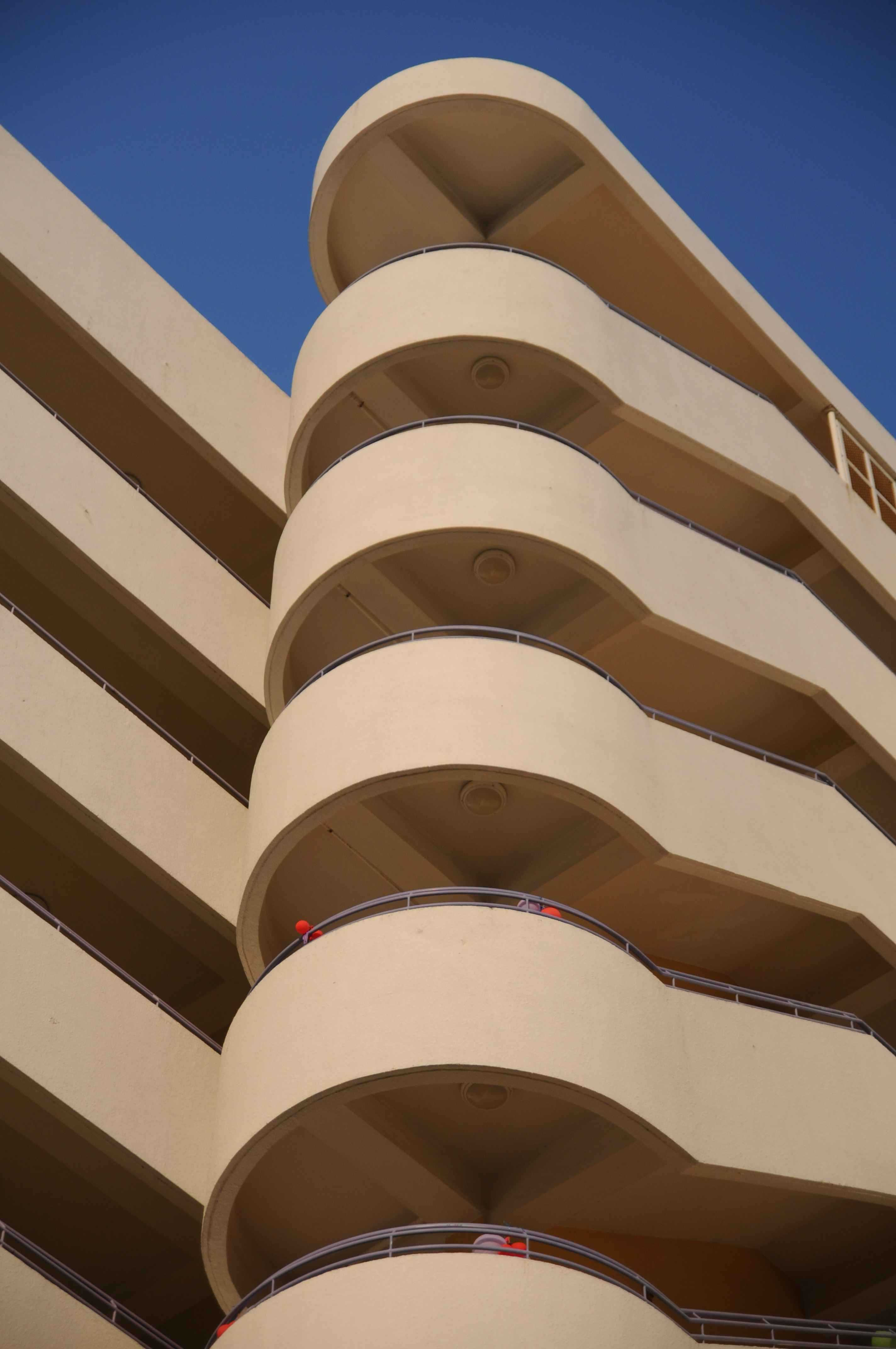
A view of the Kowloon Bay campus

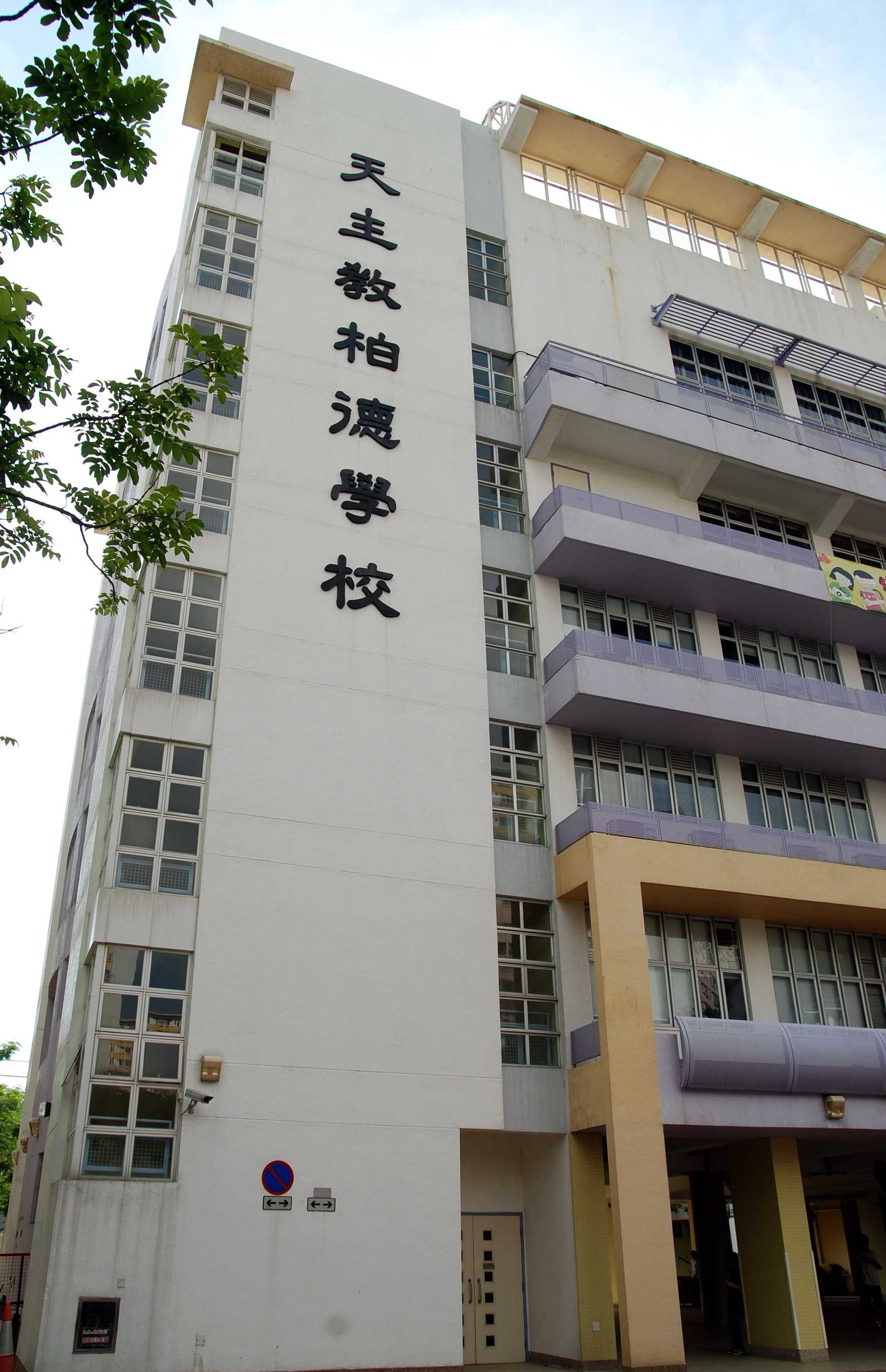
A view inside Bishop Paschang Catholic School

The school places high importance on moral education and participated in the "Marathon 101 Education Program". In 2009, they invited the blind marathon winner Henry Wanyoike and his leading runner Joseph Kibunja to the school to share with pupils their labour.

== Curriculum ==
The school places priority on both Chinese and English learning. The school promotes English reading throughout, aiming at improving language skills. The school participated in the SCOLAR English Language Camp for Primary 4 Students in 2002. The school uses Mandarin Chinese in all Chinese lessons from P1 to P3.

== Facilities ==
The campus in Kowloon Bay is of Year 2000 design by the Architectural Services Department of the Hong Kong SAR government, the current standard design for school buildings.

== Extracurricular activities ==
The school has various extra-curricular activities. The Bishop Paschang Catholic School Alumni Association awards an "A life body skill" scholarship to those pupils with outstanding performance in sports and arts.

== Supporting bodies ==
Bishop Paschang Catholic School Parent-Teacher Association was founded in 1999. Bishop Paschang Catholic School Alumni Association was founded in 2007. Through the years the alumni association accepted graduates of all years from both Ngau Tau Kok and Kowloon Bay campus. These two supporting bodies help the school in organising activities and award scholarships.

== School Song ==
The founding headmaster, Chan Man Wai, invited Taiwaneesee classical music composer, Huang You Di, to compose the school song. Lyrics were written by Lee Shi Shou, the father of the second headmaster of Bishop Paschang Memorial School PM section.

The pair also composed the school song of Bishop Walsh Memorial School.

== Notable alumni ==
- Poon Man Tik – former Hong Kong soccer team member
- POON Man Chun – younger brother of Poon Man Tik, also a former Hong Kong soccer team member
- Myolie Wu – Hong Kong TV actress
- Lee Wai-sze – Hong Kong cycling team member (2010 Guangzhou Asia Games Gold Medalist)

== Old pictures ==
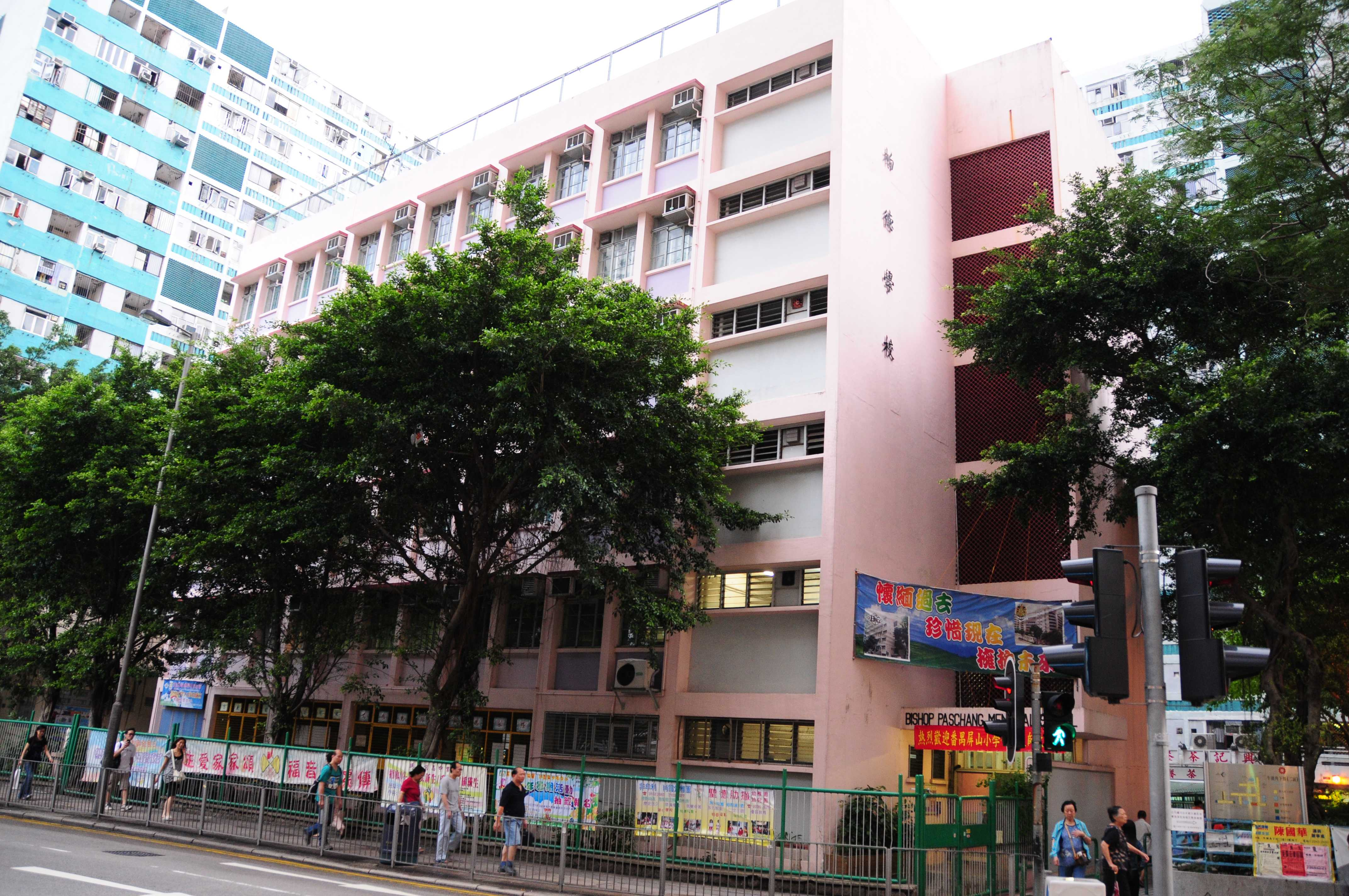
Ngau Tau Kok campus taken on 10 June 2008 (now demolished)

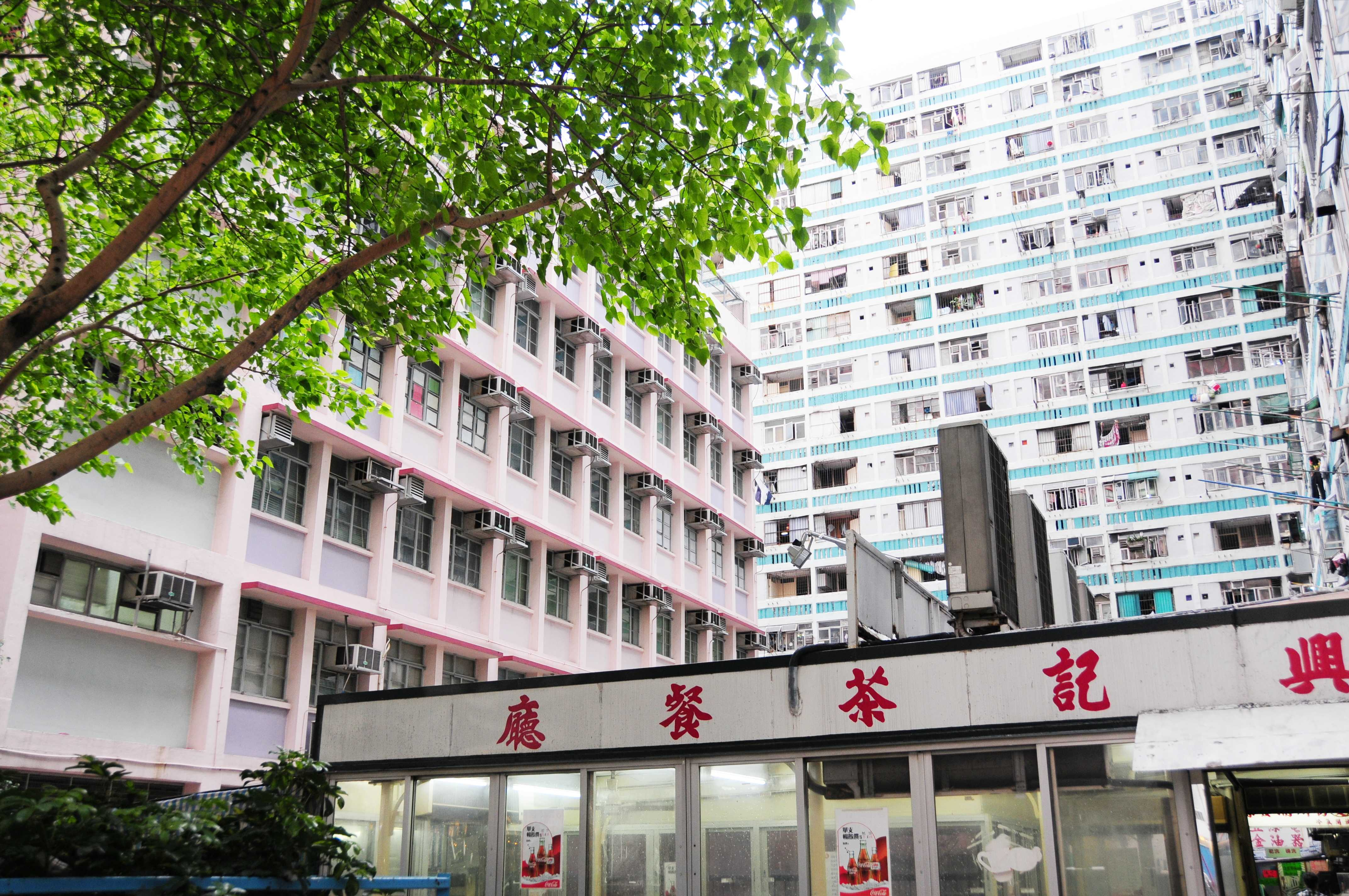
A view of Bishop Paschang Memorial School from "Hing Kee" taken on 10 June 2008 (now demolished)

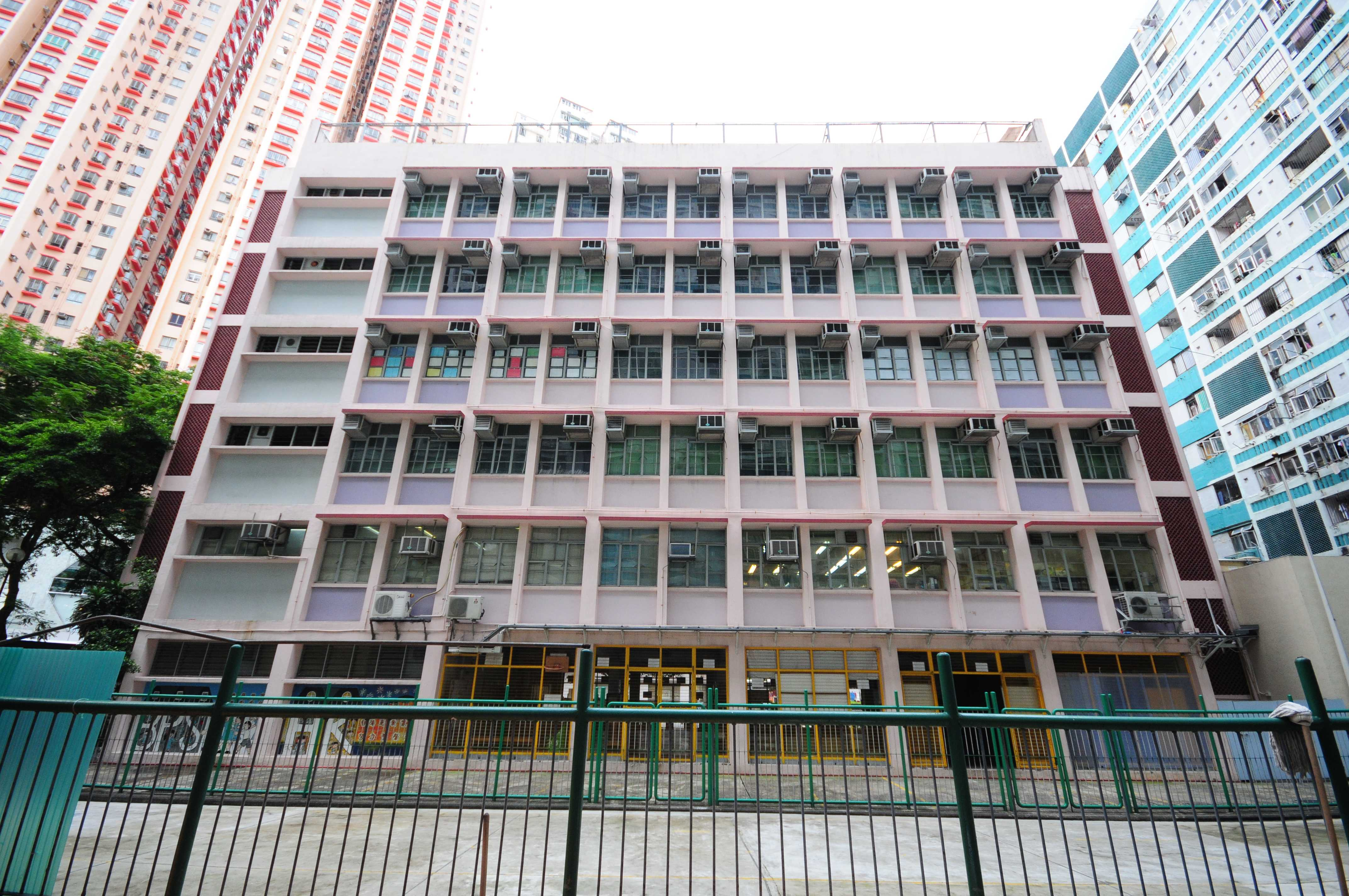
A view of the old campus in Lower Ngau Tau Kok Estate taken on 15 July 2008 (now demolished)

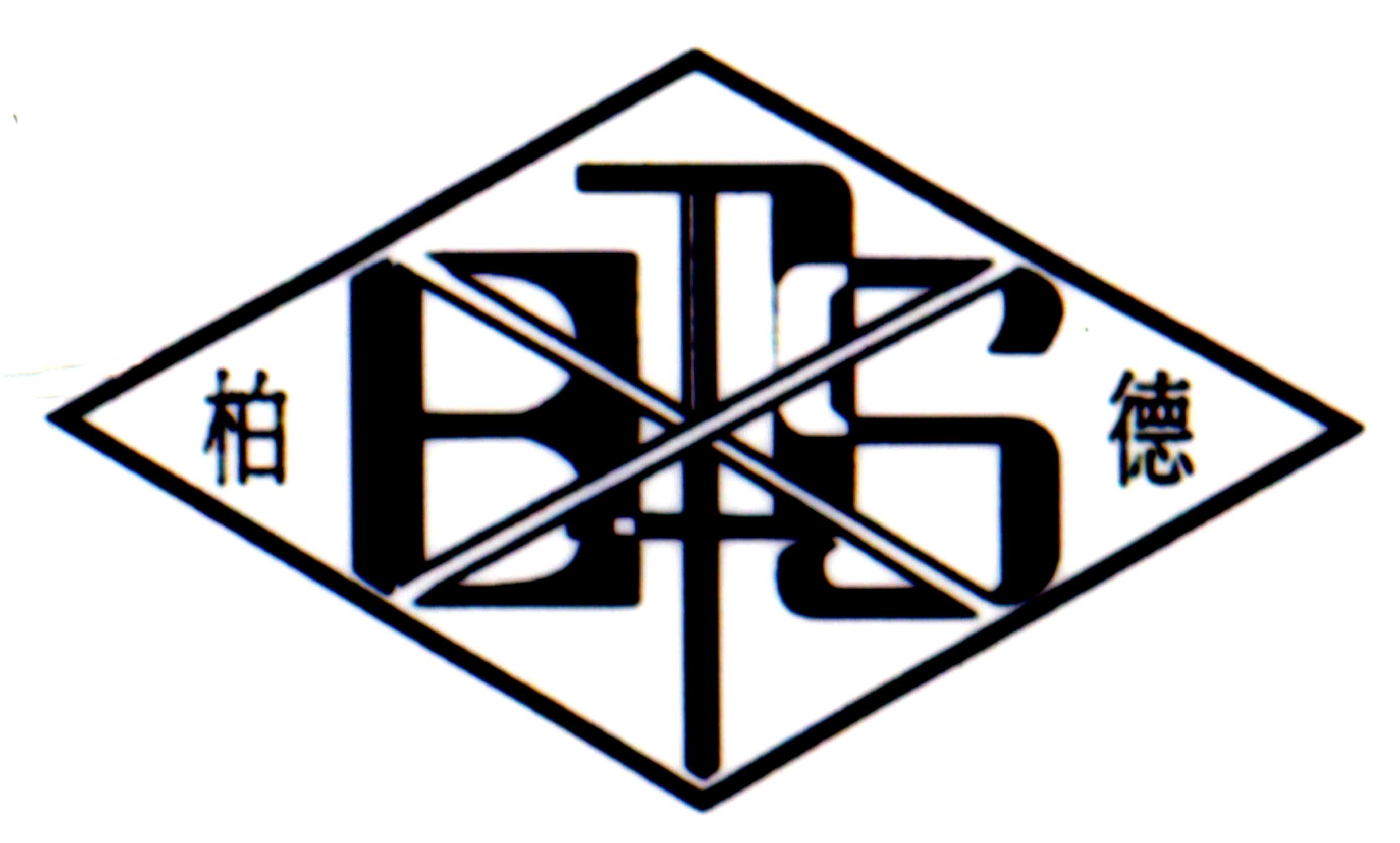
School badge of Bishop Paschang Memorial School

== See also ==
- Maryknoll
