= List of American proposed candidates for Catholic sainthood =

The following American Catholics are still being endorsed and promoted for sainthood causes by Catholic associations and dioceses but have not yet had such proposals accepted by a bishop or diocese.

== Proposed candidates for sainthood ==
	Image	Candidate for Sainthood	Born	Died	Church Status	Diocese	Type of Cause
1656		Andrew White	c. 1579; London, England, United Kingdom	27 December 1656; London, England, United Kingdom	Professed Priest, Jesuits	Baltimore	Heroic Virtues
1675		Jacques Marquette	1 June 1637; Laon, Aisne, France	18 May 1675 near Ludington, Michigan	Professed Priest, Jesuits	Marquette	Heroic Virtues
1824		Charles Nerinckx	2 October 1761; Herfelingen, Herne, Belgium	12 August 1824; Ste. Genevieve, Missouri	Diocesan Priest; Founder, Sisters of Loretto	Louisville	Heroic Virtues
1833		Anne Marie Becraft (rel. name: Aloysius)	c. 1805; Washington, D.C.	16 December 1833; Baltimore, Maryland	Professed Religious, Oblate Sisters of Providence	Baltimore	Heroic Virtues
1839		Benjamin Marie Petit	8 April 1811; Rennes, Ille-et-Vilaine, France	10 February 1839; St. Louis, Missouri	Professed Priest, Sulpicians	Vincennes	Heroic Virtues
1843		Yelizaveta Golitsyna (rel. name: Mary Elizabeth)	22 February 1797; Saint Petersburg, Russia	7 December 1843; New Orleans, Louisiana	Professed Religious, Society of the Religious of the Sacred Heart of Jesus	New Orleans	Heroic Virtues
1846		Helio Koa'eloa	c. 1815; Maui, Hawaii	1846; Maui, Hawaii	Married Layperson; Catechist	Honolulu	Heroic Virtues
1851		Juliette Noel Toussaint	c. 1786 in Haiti	14 May 1851 in New York City, New York, United States	Married Layperson	New York	Heroic Virtues
1858		Pierre-Jean-Mathias Loras	30 August 1792 in Lyon, Rhône, France	19 February 1858 in Dubuque, Iowa	Bishop of Dubuque	Dubuque	Heroic Virtues
1858		Catherine Spalding	23 December 1793; Pomfret, Maryland	20 March 1858; Louisville, Kentucky	Founder, Sisters of Charity of Nazareth	Bardstown	Heroic Virtues
1861		Maria Sybilla Riepp (rel. name: Benedicta)	28 June 1825; Waal, Bavaria, Germany	15 March 1862; St. Cloud, Minnesota	Professed Religious, Benedictine Nuns (Bavarian Congregation)	Saint Cloud	Heroic Virtues
1862		Celestina Cordero Molina	6 April 1787; San Juan, Puerto Rico	18 January 1862; San Juan, Puerto Rico	Layperson	San Juan de Puerto Rico	Heroic Virtues
1865		Francis Asbury Baker	30 March 1820; Baltimore, Maryland	4 April 1865; New York City, New York	Priest and Cofounder, Missionary Society of Saint Paul the Apostle (Paulist Fathers)	New York	Heroic Virtues
1869		Robert Walsh (rel. name: Arsenius)	1 January 1804; Listowel, County Kerry, Ireland	14 October 1869 ʻĀhuimanu, Honolulu, Hawaii	Professed Priest, Congregation of the Sacred Hearts of Jesus and Mary (Picpus)	Honolulu	Heroic Virtues
1870		Jean-Marie Odin	25 February 1800; Ambierle, Loire, France	25 May 1870; Ambierle, Loire, France	Priest, Congregation of the Mission (Vincentians); Archbishop of New Orleans	New Orleans	Heroic Virtues
1872		Pierre Yves Kéralum	2 March 1817; Quimper, Finistère, France	12 November 1872; Mercedes, Texas	Professed Priest, Missionary Oblates of Mary Immaculate	San Antonio	Heroic Virtues
1873		Pierre-Jean De Smet	30 January 1801; Dendermonde, East Flanders, Belgium	23 May 1873; St. Louis, Missouri	Professed Priest, Jesuits	St. Louis	Heroic Virtues
1874		Honora Mattingly (rel. name: Ursula)	23 October 1808; Baltimore, Maryland	1874; Emmitsburg, Maryland	Professed Religious, Daughters of Charity of Saint Vincent de Paul	Buffalo	Heroic Virtues
1876		Giovanni Paulo Pietrobattista (rel. name: Pamfilo of Magliano)	12 (or 22) April 1824; Magliano de' Marsi, L'Aquila, Italy	15 November 1876; Rome, Italy	Professed Priest, Franciscan Friars Minor; Founder, Franciscan Sisters of Allegany and the Joliet Franciscan Sisters	Allegheny and Joliet in Illinois	Heroic Virtues
1877		Louis-Amadeus Rappe	2 February 1801; Audrehem, Pas-de-Calais, France	9 August 1877; St. Albans, Vermont	Bishop of Cleveland; Founder, Sisters of Charity of St. Augustine	Cleveland	Heroic Virtues
1878		James Whelan	8 December 1823; Kilkenny, County Kilkenny, Ireland	18 February 1878; Zanesville, Ohio	Professed Priest, Dominicans; Bishop of Nashville; Founder, Dominican Sisters of St. Cecilia	Nashville	Heroic Virtues
1879		Alice Mary Thorpe (rel. name: Catherine Mary Antoninus)	1844; London, England, United Kingdom	1879; Sparkill, New York	Founder, Dominican Sisters of Our Lady of the Rosary (now known as Dominican Sisters of Sparkill)	New York	Heroic Virtues
1880		Franc Pirec	20 November 1785; Godič, Kamnik, Slovenia	22 January 1880; Ljubljana, Slovenia	Diocesan Priest	Saint Cloud	Heroic Virtues
1880		Anna Katharina Berger (rel. name: Mary Odilia)	30 April 1823; Regen, Bavaria, Germany	17 October 1880; St. Louis, Missouri	Founder, Sisters of Saint Mary (now known as Franciscan Sisters of Mary)	St. Louis	Heroic Virtues
1881		Caspar Rehrl	31 December 1809; Salzburg, Austria	3 September 1881; Barton, Wisconsin	Diocesan Priest; Founder, Sisters of Saint Agnes	Milwaukee	Heroic Virtues
1886		Mary Hardey (rel. name: Mary Aloysia)	8 December 1809; Piscataway, Maryland	17 June 1886; Paris, France	Professed Religious, Society of the Religious of the Sacred Heart of Jesus	Albany	Heroic Virtues
1886		Pierre Antoine Levy	—N/a	17 December 1886; Gainesville, Texas	Diocesan Priest	Fort Worth	Heroic Virtues
1887		Mary Frances Clarke	2 March 1803; Dublin, Ireland	4 December 1887; Dubuque, Iowa	Founder, Sisters of Charity of the Blessed Virgin Mary	Dubuque	Heroic Virtues
1887		Sebastian Wimmer (rel. name: Boniface)	14 January 1809; Thalmassing, Bavaria, Germany	8 December 1887; Latrobe, Pennsylvania	Professed Priest and Founder of the Benedictines (American-Cassinese Congregation)	Greensburg	Heroic Virtues
1888		John Christopher Drumgoole	15 August 1816; Granard, County Longford, Ireland	28 March 1888; New York City, New York	Diocesan Priest; Founder, Sisters of Francis of the Mission of the Immaculate Virgin	New York	Heroic Virtues
1888		Franz Xaver Weninger	31 October 1805; Wildhaus, Styria, Austria	29 June 1888; Cincinnati, Ohio	Professed Priest, Jesuits	Cincinnati	Heroic Virtues
1889		Anna Hinkle (rel. name: Euphrasie)	15 September 1847; Carrollton, Kentucky	27 August 1889; Saint Mary-of-the-Woods, Indiana	Professed Religious, Sisters of Providence of Saint Mary-of-the-Woods	Indianapolis	Heroic Virtues
1891		Thomas Scott Preston	23 July 1824; Hartford, Connecticut	4 November 1891; New York City, New York	Diocesan Priest; Founder, Sisters of the Divine Compassion	New York	Heroic Virtues
1892		Almeide Maxis Duchemin (rel. name: Theresa)	8 April 1810; Baltimore, Maryland	4 January 1892; West Chester, Pennsylvania	Cofounder, Sisters, Servants of the Immaculate Heart of Mary and the Oblate Sisters of Providence	Detroit	Heroic Virtues
1893		Josephine [Ptesanwanyakapi] Crowfeather (rel. name: Mary Catherine)	1867 near the Standing Rock Indian Reservation, North or South Dakota	1893; Berthold, North Dakota	Founder, Congregation of American Sisters	Bismarck	Heroic Virtues
1894		Elizabeth Hayes (rel. name: Mary Ignatius of Jesus)	1823; Saint Peter Port, Guernsey, United Kingdom	6 May 1894; Rome, Italy	Founder, Franciscan Missionary Sisters of the Immaculate Conception	Saint Paul and Minneapolis	Heroic Virtues
1895		Patrick Manogue	28 May 1831; Desart, County Kilkenny, Ireland	27 February 1895; Sacramento, California	Bishop of Sacramento	Sacramento	Heroic Virtues
1896		Princess Angeline [Kikisublo]	c. 1820; Rainier Beach, Seattle, Washington	31 May 1896; Seattle, Washington	Layperson	Seattle	Heroic Virtues
1896		Catherine Rosamund Fitzgibbon (rel. name: Mary Irene)	12 May 1824; London, United Kingdom	14 August 1896; New York City, New York	Professed Religious, Sisters of Charity of New York	New York	Heroic Virtues
1897		Augustine Francis Hewit	27 November 1820; Fairfield, Connecticut	3 July 1897; New York City, New York	Priest and Cofounder, Missionary Society of Saint Paul the Apostle (Paulist Fathers)	New York	Heroic Virtues
1897		Mary Ellen O'Connell (rel.name: Anthony)	15 August 1814; Limerick, County Limerick, Ireland	8 December 1897; Cumminsville, Cincinnati, Ohio	Professed Religious, Sisters of Charity of Cincinnati	Cincinnati	Heroic Virtues
1899		John Joseph Jessing	17 November 1836; Münster, North Rhine-Westphalia, Germany	2 November 1899; Columbus, Ohio	Diocesan Priest	Columbus	Heroic Virtues
1899		Maria Catherine Moes (rel. name: Mary Alfred)	28 October 1828; Remich, Luxembourg	18 December 1899; Rochester, Minnesota	Founder, Sisters of Saint Francis of Rochester and the Sisters of Saint Francis of Mary Immaculate	Winona–Rochester	Heroic Virtues
1900		Margaret Dowling (rel. name: Mary Dominic)	1853; Ballyconra, County Kilkenny, Ireland	14 July 1900; Sparkill, New York	Founder, Dominican Sisters of Our Lady of the Rosary (now known as Dominican Sisters of Sparkill)	New York	Heroic Virtues
1901		Ignacij Mrak	16 October 1818; Hotovlja, Slovenia	2 January 1901; Marquette, Michigan	Bishop of Saulte Saint Marie and Marquette	Marquette	Heroic Virtues
1901		Eliza Allen Starr	29 August 1824; Deerfield, Massachusetts	8 September 1901; Durand, Illinois	Layperson	Chicago	Heroic Virtues
1902		Esther Pariseau (rel. name: Marie-Joseph of the Sacred Heart)	16 April 1823; Laval, Quebec, Canada	19 January 1902; Vancouver, Washington	Professed Religious, Sisters of Providence of Montréal	Seattle	Heroic Virtues
1903		Gulstan Ropert	30 August 1839; St.-Gildas-de-Rhuys, Morbihan, France	4 January 1903; Honolulu, Hawaii	Priest, Congregation of the Sacred Hearts of Jesus and Mary (Picpus); Vicar Apostolic of the Hawaiian Islands	Honolulu	Heroic Virtues
1903		Mathilda Taylor Beasley	14 November 1832; New Orleans, Louisiana	20 December 1903; Savannah, Georgia	Professed Religious, Franciscan Nuns of the Third Order Regular	Savannah	Heroic Virtues
1903		George Deshon	20 January 1823; New London, Connecticut	30 December 1903; New York City, New York	Priest and Cofounder, Missionary Society of Saint Paul the Apostle (Paulist Fathers)	New York	Heroic Virtues
1905		Anne Marie Hazotte (rel. name: Agnes)	7 May 1847; Buffalo, New York	6 March 1905; Hays, Kansas	Cofounder, Sisters of Saint Agnes	Milwaukee	Heroic Virtues
1907		Samuel Henderson	c. 1882	13 February 1907; Memphis, Tennessee	Layperson	Memphis	Heroic Virtues
1908		John Green Hanning (rel. name: Mary Joachim)	12 January 1849; Kentucky	30 April 1908; Bardstown, Kentucky	Professed Religious, Trappists	Louisville	Heroic Virtues
1909		François Xavier Prefontaine	1838; Longueuil, Quebec, Canada	4 March 1909; Seattle, Washington	Diocesan Priest	Seattle	Heroic Virtues
1915		Catherine Mehegan (rel. name: Mary Xavier)	19 February 1825; Skibereen, County Cork, Ireland	24 June 1915; Convent Station, New Jersey	Cofounder, Sisters of Charity of Saint Elizabeth	Newark	Heroic Virtues
1918		Alfred Joyce Kilmer	6 December 1886; New Brunswick, New Jersey	30 July 1918 near Seringes-et-Nesles, Marne, France	Married Layperson	Newark	Heroic Virtues
1922		Mary Walsh	1850; New York	1922; New York	Founder, Dominican Sisters of the Sick Poor	New York	Heroic Virtues
1926		Helena Pelczar	25 December 1888; Korczyna, Krosno, Poland	27 April 1926; Cleveland, Ohio	Layperson	Cleveland	Heroic Virtues
1929		Emma Franziska Höll (rel. name: Mary Alexia)	1838; Germany	1929	Founder, School Sisters of St. Francis	La Crosse	Heroic Virtues
1931		Elizabeth Barbara Williams (rel. name: Mary Theodore)	11 February 1868; Baton Rouge, Louisiana	14 July 1931; New York City, New York	Founder, Franciscan Handmaids of the Most Pure Heart of Mary	New York	Heroic Virtues
1932		Benjamin Joseph Salmon	15 October 1888; Denver, Colorado	15 February 1932; Chicago, Illinois	Married Layperson	Chicago	Heroic Virtues
1932		Ambrose Kanoealu'i Hutchison	c. 1856; Honomāʻele, Hāna Hawaii	17 July 1932; Kalaupapa, Moloka'i, Hawaii	Married Layperson	Honolulu	Heroic Virtues
1933		Daniel Arthur Rudd	7 August 1854; Bardstown, Kentucky	3 December 1933; Bardstown, Kentucky	Layperson	Louisville	Heroic Virtues
1933		Susana Carty (rel. name: Mary Praxedes)	1854; Bawnboy, County Cavan, Ireland	16 December 1933; St. Louis, Missouri	Professed Religious, Sisters of Loretto	El Paso	Heroic Virtues
1935		Lurana White (rel. name: Mary Francis)	12 April 1870; Warwick, New York	15 April 1935; Graymoor, Garrison, New York	Cofounder, Franciscan Sisters of the Atonement	New York	Heroic Virtues
1936		Marie Rose Ferron	24 May 1902; Saint-Germain-de-Grantham, Quebec, Canada	11 May 1936; Providence, Rhode Island	Layperson	Providence	Heroic Virtues
1937		Margaret Reilly (rel. name: Mary of the Crown of Thorns)	25 June 1884; Manhattan, New York	18 May 1937; Peekskill, New York	Professed Religious, Religious of the Good Shepherd	New York	Heroic Virtues
1940		Mary Frances Cunningham (rel. name: Mary Demetrias)	8 October 1859; Washington, D.C.	9 April 1940; Towson, Maryland	Founder, Mission Helpers of the Sacred Heart	Baltimore	Heroic Virtues
1940		Johanna Butler (rel. name: Marie Joseph)	22 July 1860; Ballynunry, Kilkenny, Ireland	23 April 1940; Tarrytown, New York	Professed Religious, Religious of the Sacred Heart of Mary	New York	Heroic Virtues
1941		Aloysius Schmitt	4 December 1909; Saint Lucas, Iowa	7 December 1941 aboard USS Oklahoma, Pearl Harbor, Honolulu, Hawaii	Diocesan Priest	Dubuque	Heroic Virtues
1942		Leopoldina Burns (rel. name: Maria Leopoldina)	28 August 1856; Utica, New York	3 June 1942; Honolulu, Hawaii	Professed Religious, Franciscan Sisters of Syracuse	Honolulu	Heroic Virtues
1943		John Patrick Washington	18 July 1908; Newark, New Jersey	3 February 1943 aboard SS Dorchester, at the Atlantic Ocean	Diocesan Priest	Newark	Offer of Life
1944		Claude Newman	1 December 1923; Stuttgart, Arkansas	4 February 1944; Vicksburg, Mississippi	Young Layperson	Little Rock	Heroic Virtues
1945		James Paul McCloskey	9 December 1870; Philadelphia, Pennsylvania	10 April 1945; Jaro, Iloilo, Philippines	Bishop of Jaro	Jaro	Heroic Virtues
1948		Ignace François Lissner	6 April 1867; Wolxheim, Bas-Rhin, France	7 August 1948; Teaneck, New Jersey	Professed Priest, Society of African Missions; Founder, Franciscan Handmaids of the Most Pure Heart of Mary	New York	Heroic Virtues
1949		Pierre Joseph Maurin	9 May 1877; Saint-Julien-du-Tournel, Lozère, France	15 May 1949; Newburgh, New York	Layperson; Cofounder, Catholic Worker Movement	New York	Heroic Virtues
1950		Mary Giesen (rel. name: Mary Augustine)	6 December 1860; Union Hill, Minnesota	25 February 1950; Maryville, Missouri	Founder, Sisters of Saint Francis of Maryville	St. Louis	Heroic Virtues
1950		Ellen Purtell (rel. name: Regina)	14 November 1866; Monches, Wisconsin	24 October 1950; New Orleans, Louisiana	Vowed Member, Daughters of Charity of Saint Vincent de Paul	Alexandria (Louisiana)	Heroic Virtues
1951		Joseph Augustine Mattingly (rel. name: Sylvan)	28 May 1882; Leitchfield, Kentucky	30 December 1951; Louisville, Kentucky	Professed Religious, Xaverian Brothers; Founder, Our Lady's Rosary Makers	Louisville	Heroic Virtues
1953		William Howard Bishop	19 December 1885; Washington, D.C.	11 June 1953; Glendale, Ohio	Diocesan Priest; Founder, Home Missioners of America (Glenmary Home Missioners) and the Home Mission Sisters of America (Glenmary Sisters)	Cincinnati	Heroic Virtues
1953		Helena Agnes Franey (rel. name: Marie Helene)	29 July 1898; Galesburg, Illinois	23 November 1953; Saint Mary-of-the-Woods, Indiana	Professed Religious, Sisters of Providence of Saint Mary-of-the-Woods	Indianapolis	Heroic Virtues
1955		Mary Josephine Rogers (rel. name: Mary Joseph)	27 October 1882; Roxbury, Boston, Massachusetts	9 October 1955; Manhattan, New York	Cofounder, Maryknoll Sisters of Saint Dominics	New York	Heroic Virtues
1956		Nancy Hamilton	20 June 1942; Los Angeles, California	7 June 1956; Oakland, California	Child	Oakland	Heroic Virtues
1957		Marion Frances Gurney	6 June 1868; New Orleans, Louisiana	9 February 1957; Nyack, New York	Founder, Sisters of Our Lady of Christian Doctrine	New York	Heroic Virtues
1960		Edward Francis Garesché	27 December 1876; St. Louis, Missouri	2 October 1960; Framingham, Massachusetts	Professed Priest of the Jesuits; Founder, Sons of Mary, Health of the Sick	Boston	Heroic Virtues
1961		Thomas Anthony Dooley III	17 January 1927; St. Louis, Missouri	18 January 1961; New York City, New York	Layperson	New York	Heroic Virtues
1963		John LaFarge Jr.	13 February 1880; Newport, Rhode Island	24 November 1963; New York City, New York	Professed Priest, Jesuits	New York	Heroic Virtues
1964		Anthony Joseph Brouwers	5 September 1912; Los Angeles, California	14 January 1964; Los Angeles, California	Diocesan Priest	Los Angeles	Heroic Virtues
1964		Joseph Timothy O'Callahan	14 May 1905; Boston, Massachusetts	18 March 1964; Worcester, Massachusetts	Professed Priest, Jesuits	Worcester	Heroic Virtues
1964		Mary Flannery O'Connor	25 March 1925; Savannah, Georgia	3 August 1964; Milledgeville, Georgia	Layperson	Savannah	Heroic Virtues
1965		Henri Roy	8 September 1898; Lewiston, Maine	16 June 1965; Montréal, Quebec, Canada	Professed Priest, Missionary Oblates of Mary Immaculate; Founder, Secular Institute "Pius X"	Montreal	Heroic Virtues
1966		Bridget Della Mary Gavin (rel. name: Mary Ignatia)	1 January 1889; Burren, County Mayo, Ireland	1 April 1960; Richfield, Ohio	Professed Religious, Sisters of Charity of Saint Augustine	Cleveland	Heroic Virtues
1967		John Courtney Murray	12 September 1904; New York City, New York	16 August 1967; Queens, New York	Professed Priest, Jesuits	New York	Heroic Virtues
1967		Bruce Phillip Smith	8 February 1920; Faribault, Minnesota	28 August 1967; Alexandria, Minnesota	Layperson	Saint Paul and Minneapolis	Heroic Virtues
1968		Adolph John Paschang	16 April 1895; Martinsburg, Missouri	3 February 1968; Happy Valley, Hong Kong	Priest, Maryknoll Missionary Society; Bishop of Jiangmen [Kongmoon]; Titular Bishop of Sasima	Jiangmen	Heroic Virtues
1968		Paul John Hallinan	8 April 1911; Painesville, Ohio	27 March 1968; Atlanta, Georgia	Archbishop of Atlanta	Atlanta	Heroic Virtues
1968		Thomas Merton (rel. name: Louis)	31 January 1915; Prades, Pyrénées-Orientales, France	10 December 1968; Samut Prakan, Thailand	Professed Priest, Trappists	Bardstown	Heroic Virtues
1969		Gerald Michael Fitzgerald	29 October 1894; Framingham, Massachusetts	28 June 1969; Marlboro, Massachusetts	Priest and Founder of the Servants of the Paraclete; Founder, Handmaids of the Precious Blood	Santa Fe and Boston	Heroic Virtues
1969		Joseph Clifford Fenton	16 January 1906; Springfield, Illinois	7 July 1969; Chicopee, Massachusetts	Diocesan Priest	Springfield	Heroic Virtues
1972		Thomas Harold Colgan	27 November 1894; Elizabeth, New Jersey	16 April 1972; Miami, Florida	Diocesan Priest; Founder, Blue Army of Our Lady of Fátima	Newark	Heroic Virtues
1972		Paul Francis Leibold	22 December 1914; Dayton, Ohio	1 June 1972; Cincinnati, Ohio	Archbishop of Cincinnati	Cincinnati	Heroic Virtues
1972		Gordon Edward Murphy	24 January 1918; Chicago, Illinois	28 September 1972; Patna, Bihar, India	Professed Priest, Jesuits	Patna	Heroic Virtues
1972		Roberto Enrique Clemente Walker	18 August 1934; San Antón, Carolina, Puerto Rico	31 December 1972 off the coast of Isla Verde, Puerto Rico	Married Layperson	San Juan de Puerto Rico	Heroic Virtues
1974		Patrick Francis Crowley	23 September 1911; Chicago, Illinois	20 November 1974; Chicago, Illinois	Married Layperson; Founder, Christian Family Movement	Chicago	Heroic Virtues
1975		William "Bill" Gauchat	31 July 1907; Avon, Ohio	16 April 1975; Avon, Ohio	Married Layperson; Member, Catholic Worker Movement	Cleveland	Heroic Virtues
1975		Bernard Francis Meyer	16 June 1891; Brooklyn, Iowa	8 May 1975; Sleepy Hollow, New York	Priest, Maryknoll Missionary Society; Prefect Apostolic of Wuzhou	Wuzhou	Heroic Virtues
1977		Dietrich von Hildebrand	12 October 1889; Florence, Italy	26 January 1977; New Rochelle, New York	Married Layperson	New York	Heroic Virtues
1978		Thomas Wyatt Turner	16 March 1877; Hughesville, Maryland	21 April 1978; Washington, D.C.	Married Layperson	Washington, D.C.	Heroic Virtues
1978		Catherine Passananti	6 January 1894; Boston, Massachusetts	29 December 1978; Boston, Massachusetts	Layperson	Boston	Heroic Virtues
1979		Reynold Henry Hillenbrand	19 July 1904; Chicago, Illinois	22 May 1979; Chicago, Illinois	Diocesan Priest	Chicago	Heroic Virtues
1980		Martha Euphemia Lofton Haynes	11 September 1890; Washington, D.C.	25 July 1980; Washington, D.C.	Married Layperson	Washington, D.C.	Heroic Virtues
1980		Carol Ann Piette (rel. name: Rosa Carol)	29 September 1939; Appleton, Wisconsin	23 August 1980; El Zapote, Ahuachapán, El Salvador	Professed Religious, Maryknoll Sisters of Saint Dominic	Chalatenango	Heroic Virtues
1980		August Mauge	15 September 1910; Pennsylvania	November 1980; Steubenville, Ohio	Layperson; Cofounder, Apostolate for Family Consecration	Steubenville	Heroic Virtues
1980		John Howard Griffin	16 June 1920; Dallas, Texas	9 September 1980; Fort Worth, Texas	Married Layperson; Member, Lay Carmelites	Dallas	Heroic Virtues
1981		James Edward Walsh	30 April 1891; Cumberland, Maryland	29 July 1981; Ossining, New York	Priest, Maryknoll Missionary Society; Bishop of Jiangmen	Jiangmen and Brooklyn	Heroic Virtues
1982		Horace McKenna	2 January 1899; New York City, New York	11 May 1982; Washington, D.C.	Professed Priest, Jesuits	Washington, D.C.	Heroic Virtues
1982		John Timothy Leary	22 February 1958; Boston, Massachusetts	31 August 1982; Boston, Massachusetts	Young Layperson; Member, Catholic Worker Movement and Pax Christi	Boston	Heroic Virtues
1982		Grace Kelly Grimaldi	12 November 1929; Philadelphia, Pennsylvania	14 September 1982; La Colle, Monaco	Married Layperson	Monaco	Heroic Virtues
1984		Marion Ganey	21 July 1904; Gillespie, Illinois	23 September 1984; Ba, Fiji	Professed Priest, Jesuits	Suva	Heroic Virtues
1986		Lawrence Lovasik	22 June 1913; Tarentum, Pennsylvania	9 June 1986; Pittsburgh, Pennsylvania	Professed Priest, Society of the Divine Word; Founder, Congregation of the Divine Spirit and the Family Service Secular Institute	Pittsburgh	Heroic Virtues
1989		Robert Louis Hodapp	1 October 1910; Mankato, Minnesota	26 October 1989; Denver, Colorado	Professed Priest, Jesuits; Bishop of Belize	Belize City–Belmopan	Heroic Virtues
1990		Julia Crotta (rel. name: Maria Nazarena of Jesus)	15 October 1907; Glastonbury, Connecticut	7 February 1990; Rome, Italy	Professed Religious, Camaldolese Nuns	Rome	Heroic Virtues
1990		Maurice Patrick Barrett (rel. name: Matthias)	15 March 1900; Waterford, Ireland	12 August 1990; Albuquerque, New Mexico	Founder and Professed Priest, Little Brothers of the Good Shepherd	Santa Fe	Heroic Virtues
1990		Harold Arnoldus Stevens	19 October 1907; Johns Island, South Carolina	9 November 1990; Harlem, New York City, New York	Married Layperson	New York	Heroic Virtues
1992		Richard Henry Ackerman	30 August 1903; Pittsburgh, Pennsylvania	18 November 1992; Covington, Kentucky	Professed Priest, Congregation of the Holy Spirit (Spiritans); Bishop of Covington	Covington	Heroic Virtues
1992		James Patterson Lyke	18 February 1939; Chicago, Illinois	27 December 1992; Atlanta, Georgia	Professed Priest, Franciscan Friars Minor; Archbishop of Atlanta	Atlanta	Heroic Virtues
1993		Ann Manganaro	1946; St. Louis, Missouri	6 June 1993; Guarjila, Chalatenango, El Salvador	Professed Religious, Sisters of Loretto	Cahalatenango	Heroic Virtues
1994		Enrique San Pedro	9 March 1926; Havana, Cuba	17 July 1994; Miami, Florida, United States	Professed Priest, Jesuits; Bishop of Brownsville	Brownsville	Heroic Virtues
1996		Mary Evelyn Puleo Chmiel	26 January 1963; Missouri	12 January 1996; St. Louis, Missouri	Married Layperson; Member, Catholic Worker Movement	St. Louis	Heroic Virtues
1996		Lawrence Martin Jenco	27 November 1934; Joliet, Illinois	19 July 1996; Hillside, Illinois	Professed Priest, Servites	Chicago	Heroic Virtues
1996		Henri Nouwen	24 January 1932; Nijkerk, Gelderland, Netherlands	21 September 1996; Hilversum, North Holland, Netherlands	Diocesan Priest	Utrecht	Heroic Virtues
1996		Joseph Louis Bernardin	2 April 1928; Columbia, South Carolina	14 November 1996; Chicago, Illinois	Archbishop of Chicago; Cardinal	Chicago	Heroic Virtues
1998		Charles Alvin Kekumano	12 May 1919; Kealakekua, Hawaii	19 January 1998; Honolulu, Hawaii	Diocesan Priest	Honolulu	Heroic Virtues
2000		Mary Mildred Neuzil (rel. name: Mary Ephrem)	2 August 1916; Brooklyn, New York	10 January 2000; New Riegel, Ohio	Professed Religious, Contemplative Sisters of Our Lady of the Nativity	Cincinnati	Heroic Virtues
2000		Daniel Egan	18 June 1915; The Bronx, New York	10 February 2000; Peekskill, New York	Professed Priest, Franciscan Friars of the Atonement	New York	Heroic Virtues
2000		Dorothy Helen Schmitt Gauchat	22 February 1921; Cleveland, Ohio	20 February 2000; Westlake, Ohio	Married Layperson; Member, Catholic Worker Movement	Cleveland	Heroic Virtues
2000		Vincent Donovan	15 August 1926; Hazelwood, Pittsburgh, Pennsylvania	13 May 2000; Pittsburgh, Pennsylvania	Professed Priest, Congregation of the Holy Spirit (Spiritans)	Pittsburgh	Heroic Virtues
2000		Jan Karski [Kozielewski]	24 June 1914; Łódź, Poland	13 July 2000; Washington, D.C.	Married Layperson	Washington	Heroic Virtues
2000		Isolina Ferré Aguayo	5 September 1914; Ponce, Puerto Rico	3 August 2000; Ponce, Puerto Rico	Professed Religious, Missionary Servants of the Most Blessed Trinity	Ponce	Heroic Virtues
2000		Charles William Kram Jr.	30 September 1929; Shiner, Texas	13 August 2000; Lavaca, Texas	Diocesan Priest	Victoria (Texas)	Heroic Virtues
2000		Eileen Mary Egan	27 December 1911; Blaengwrach, West Glamorgan, Wales	7 October 2000; Greenwich Village, New York	Layperson; Member, Pax Christi International	New York	Heroic Virtues
2000		Harry Murray (rel. name: Gratian)	29 December 1923; Pennsylvania, United States	12 December 2000; Bacolod, Negros Occidental, Philippines	Diocesan Priest	Bacolod	Heroic Virtues
2001		Robert Emmett Judge (rel. name: Mychal Fallon)	11 May 1933; New York City, New York	11 September 2001; Lower Manhattan, New York	Professed Priest, Franciscan Friars Minor	New York	Offer of Life
2001		John Matthias Haffert	23 August 1915; Sea Isle City, New Jersey	31 October 2001; Washington, New Jersey	Married Layperson; Cofounder, Blue Army of Our Lady of Fátima	Newark	Heroic Virtues
2001		Mathew Ahmann	10 September 1931; St. Cloud, Minnesota	31 December 2001; Washington, D.C.	Married Layperson	Saint Cloud	Heroic Virtues
2002		Adélaide de Bethune	12 January 1914; Schaerbeek, Belgium	1 May 2002; Portsmouth, Rhode Island	Layperson; Member, Catholic Worker Movement	Providence	Heroic Virtues
2002		Joseph Gluszek	28 October 1910; Poland	19 September 2002; Great Falls, Montana	Diocesan Priest	Great Falls–Billings	Heroic Virtues

=== Group martyrs ===
The following list of martyrs are based on Bishop David Arias' The Martyrs of the United States and Brian O'Neel's 150 North American Martyrs You Should Know. Majority of the martyrs belong to the Franciscans, Jesuits and Dominicans, and some of which are currently processed for canonization.

Image	Candidate for Sainthood	Born	Died	Church Status	Diocese
Domimican Martyrs of Texas (1584)
	Juan Ferrer	c. 1553; Valencia, Spain	c. 1584 off the coast of Padre Island, Texas	Professed Priest, Dominicans	Corpus Christi
	Diego de la Cruz	Spain	c. 1584 off the coast of Padre Island, Texas	Professed Priest, Dominicans	
	Juan de Mena	Spain	c. 1584 off the coast of Padre Island, Texas	Professed Religious, Dominicans	
Iroquois Martyrs of Auriesville (1680–1692)
	Stephen [Étienne] Tegananokoa	c. 1655; New York	25 October 1680; Onondaga, near Auriesville, New York	Married Layperson	New York
	Margaret [Marguerite] Garangouas	c. 1667; New York	10 March 1692; Onondaga, near Auriesville, New York	Married Layperson	New York
	child of Margaret Garangouas	New York	10 March 1692; Onondaga, near Auriesville, New York	Child	New York
	Frances [François] Gonannhatenha	New York	10 March 1692; Onondaga, near Auriesville, New York	Layperson	New York
	Stephen [Étienne] Hoonhouentsiontquoet	New York	10 March 1692; Onondaga, near Auriesville, New York	Layperson	New York
Franciscan Martyrs of the Southwest (1632–1834)
	Martín de Arvide	Puerto de San Sebastian, Cantabria, Spain	27 February 1632 near Hawikuh, New Mexico	Professed Priest, Franciscan Friars Minor	Gallup
	Francisco Porras	Spain	28 June 1633; Walpi, Arizona	Professed Priest, Franciscan Friars Minor	Gallup
	Pedro de Avila y Ayala	Spain	17 October 1672; Hawikuh, New Mexico	Professed Priest, Franciscan Friars Minor	Gallup
	Ildefonso [Alfonso] Gil de Avila	Spain	January 1675; Socorro, New Mexico	Professed Priest, Franciscan Friars Minor	Santa Fe
	Juan Bernal	Mexico City, Mexico	10 August 1680; Santa Fe, New Mexico	Professed Priest, Franciscan Friars Minor	Santa Fe
	Juan Bautista Pío	Vitoria-Gasteiz, Álava, Spain	10 August 1680; Tesuque, New Mexico	Professed Priest, Franciscan Friars Minor	Santa Fe
	Domingo Vera	Mexico City, Mexico	10 August 1680; Galisteo, New Mexico	Professed Priest, Franciscan Friars Minor	Santa Fe
	Manuel Tinaco	Extremadura, Spain	10 August 1680; Galisteo, New Mexico	Professed Priest, Franciscan Friars Minor	Santa Fe
	Francisco Lorenzana	Santiago de Compostela, A Coruña, Spain	10 August 1680; Santo Domingo Pueblo, New Mexico	Professed Priest, Franciscan Friars Minor	Santa Fe
	José Montes de Oca	Querétaro, San Luis Potosí, Mexico	10 August 1680; Santo Domingo Pueblo, New Mexico	Professed Priest, Franciscan Friars Minor	Santa Fe
	Lucas Maldonado	Spain	10 August 1680; Santo Domingo Pueblo, New Mexico	Professed Priest, Franciscan Friars Minor	Santa Fe
	Juan Talaban	Seville, Spain	10 August 1680; Santo Domingo Pueblo, New Mexico	Professed Priest, Franciscan Friars Minor	Santa Fe
	Antonio Mora	Puebla	10 August 1680; Taos, New Mexico	Professed Priest, Franciscan Friars Minor	Santa Fe
	Matías Randón	Puebla	10 August 1680; Taos, New Mexico	Professed Priest, Franciscan Friars Minor	Santa Fe
	Juan de Pedrosa	Mexico City	10 August 1680; Taos, New Mexico	Professed Religious, Franciscan Friars Minor	Santa Fe
	Luís Morales	Baeza, Jaén, Spain	10 August 1680; San Ildefonso Pueblo, New Mexico	Professed Priest, Franciscan Friars Minor	Santa Fe
	Antonio Sánchez Pro	Mexico City	10 August 1680; San Ildefonso Pueblo, New Mexico	Professed Religious, Franciscan Friars Minor	Santa Fe
	Tomas Torres	Tepotzotlán, Estado de México, Mexico	10 August 1680; Nambé Pueblo, New Mexico	Professed Priest, Franciscan Friars Minor	Santa Fe
	Juan Jesús-María	Granada, Spain	10 August 1680; Jemez Pueblo, New Mexico	Professed Priest, Franciscan Friars Minor	Santa Fe
	Fernando Velasco	Cádiz, Spain	10 August 1680; Pecos, Texas	Professed Priest, Franciscan Friars Minor	El Paso
	José Espeleta	Navarre, Spain	11 August 1680 near Walpi, Arizona	Professed Priest, Franciscan Friars Minor	Gallup
	Agustín Santamaría	Michoacán, Spain	11 August 1680 near Zuni, Arizona	Professed Priest, Franciscan Friars Minor	Gallup
	José Figueroa	Mexico City	11 August 1680; Awatovi, Arizona	Professed Priest, Franciscan Friars Minor	Gallup
	José Trujillo	Cádiz, Spain	11 August 1680; Shongopovi, Arizona	Professed Priest, Franciscan Friars Minor	Gallup
	Juan Val	Castile, Spain	11 August 1680; Zuni Pueblo, New Mexico	Professed Priest, Franciscan Friars Minor	Gallup
	Francisco Casañas de Jesús María	c. 1656; Barcelona, Spain	4 June 1696; Jemez Pueblo, New Mexico	Professed Priest, Franciscan Friars Minor	Santa Fe
	Antonio Carbonell	Spain	4 June 1696; Jemez Pueblo, New Mexico	Professed Priest, Franciscan Friars Minor	Santa Fe
	José de Arbizu	Spain	4 June 1696; Jemez Pueblo, New Mexico	Professed Priest, Franciscan Friars Minor	Santa Fe
	Francisco Corvera	Spain	4 June 1696; San Ildefonso Pueblo, New Mexico	Professed Priest, Franciscan Friars Minor	Santa Fe
	Antonio Moreno	Spain	4 June 1696; San Ildefonso Pueblo, New Mexico	Professed Priest, Franciscan Friars Minor	Santa Fe
	José Pita	Spain	1721; San Antonio, Texas	Professed Priest, Franciscan Friars Minor	San Antonio
	Luís Montes de Oca	Spain	1726; Texas	Professed Priest, Franciscan Friars Minor	San Antonio
	Francisco Javier Silva	Spain	5 July 1749 near San Juan Bautista, California	Professed Priest, Franciscan Friars Minor	Monterey
	Juan José de Ganzabal	Spain	11 May 1752; San Gabriel, California	Professed Priest, Franciscan Friars Minor	Los Angeles
	Alonso Giraldo de Terreros	19 June 1699; Cortegana, Huelva, Spain	16 March 1758; San Saba, Texas	Professed Priest, Franciscan Friars Minor	Austin
	José de Santiesteban Aberín	March 1719; Aberin, Navarre, Spain	16 March 1758; San Saba, Texas	Professed Priest, Franciscan Friars Minor	Austin
	Melcior Jaume Vallespir (rel. name. Lluís)	18 October 1740; Sant Joan, Islas Baleares, Spain	5 November 1775; San Diego, California	Professed Priest, Franciscan Friars Minor	San Diego
	Francisco Hermenegildo Garcés	12 April 1728; Morata de Jalón, Zaragoza, Spain	18 July 1781; Yuma, Arizona	Professed Priest, Franciscan Friars Minor	Tucson
	Juan Antonio de Barreneche	Spain	18 July 1781; Yuma, Arizona	Professed Priest, Franciscan Friars Minor	Tucson
	José Matías Moreno	Spain	18 July 1781; Yuma, Arizona	Professed Priest, Franciscan Friars Minor	Tucson
	Juan Díaz	Spain	18 July 1781; Yuma, Arizona	Professed Priest, Franciscan Friars Minor	Tucson
	Andrés Quintana	27 November 1772; Antonossa, Álava, Spain	12 October 1812; Santa Cruz, California	Professed Priest, Franciscan Friars Minor	Monterey
	Juan Antonio Díaz de León	c. 1786; Mexico	4 November 1834; San Augustine, Texas	Professed Priest, Franciscan Friars Minor	Fort Worth
Jesuit Martyrs of Wisconsin (1661–1765)
	René Ménard	2 March 1605; Paris, France	(disappeared); August 1661 near Menomonie, Wisconsin	Professed Priest, Jesuits	Green Bay
	Jean Guerin	France	23 December 1672; Oshkosh, Wisconsin	Professed Religious, Jesuits	Green Bay
	Louis Le Boesme	France	20 April 1687 near De Pere, Wisconsin	Professed Religious, Jesuits	Green Bay
	two unnamed martyrs		29 September 1765; Wisconsin	Professed Priests, Jesuits	Green Bay
Missionary Martyrs of China (1929–1947)
	Walter Coveyou (rel. name: Walter of the Seven Sorrows of Mary)	17 October 1894; Petoskey, Michigan	24 April 1929; Huachiao, Hunan, China	Professed Priests, Passionists	Hengzhou
	Lawrence Seybold (rel. name: Clement of Saint Michael)	18 April 1896; Dunkirk, New York	24 April 1929; Huachiao, Hunan, China	Professed Priests, Passionists	Hengzhou
	Claude Holbein (rel. name: Godfrey of Jesus)	4 February 1899; Baltimore, Maryland	24 April 1929; Huachiao, Hunan, China	Professed Priests, Passionists	Hengzhou
	Gerard Donovan	14 October 1904; McKeesport, Pennsylvania	c. January 1938 near Huanren, Liaoning, China	Priest, Maryknoll Missionary Society	Wuzhou
	Otto Rauschenbach	23 June 1898; St. Louis, Missouri	14 May 1945; Qilan, Yunan, Guangdong, China	Priest, Maryknoll Missionary Society	Jiangmen
	James Luke Devine	15 November 1905; Pittsburgh, Pennsylvania	23 May 1947; Chungan, Fujian, China	Professed Priest, Dominicans	Fuzhou
Missionary Martyrs of Papua New Guinea (1934–1945)
	Anton Fran (rel. name: Eugen)	21 December 1900; Mount Carmel, Illinois	23 January 1935; Salamaua, Morobe, Papua New Guinea	Professed Religious, Society of the Divine Word	Lae
	Joseph Kotrba	13 January 1913; Chicago, Illinois	19 February 1943; Bogia, Madang, Papua New Guinea	Professed Priest, Society of the Divine Word	Madang
	Arthur Manion	19 March 1901; Turtle Creek, Pennsylvania	17 March 1943 aboard the Japanese destroyer Akikaze, at the Bismarck Sea, near Manus, Papua New Guinea	Professed Priest, Society of the Divine Word	Madang
	Alfred Salois (rel. name: Victor)	29 October 1908; Linwood, Michigan	17 March 1943 aboard the Japanese destroyer Akikaze, at the Bismarck Sea, near Manus, Papua New Guinea	Professed Religious, Society of the Divine Word	Madang
	Agnes Kötter (rel. name: Adelaide)	24 January 1907; Freeport, Minnesota	17 March 1943 aboard the Japanese destroyer Akikaze, at the Bismarck Sea, near Manus, Papua New Guinea	Professed Religious, Missionary Sisters Servants of the Holy Spirit	Madang
	John Conley	2 July 1898; Philadelphia, Pennsylvania	10 December 1943; Kieta, Bougainville, Papua New Guinea	Professed Priest, Society of Mary (Marist Missionaries)	Bougainville
Martyrs of Onalaska, Wisconsin (1985)
	John Daniel Rossiter	2 July 1920; La Crosse, Wisconsin, United States	7 February 1985; Onalaska, Wisconsin, United States	Diocesan Priest	La Crosse
	Ferdinand Leonard Roth Sr.	22 December 1929; La Crosse, Wisconsin, United States	7 February 1985; Onalaska, Wisconsin, United States	Married Layperson	La Crosse
	William George Hammes	16 August 1918; Barre, La Crosse, Wisconsin, United States	7 February 1985; Onalaska, Wisconsin, United States	Married Layperson	La Crosse
Missionary Martyrs of Gardnersville (1992)
	Barbara Ann Muttra	11 March 1923; Springfield, Illinois, United States	20 October 1992 between Gardnersville and Barnesville, Montserrado, Liberia	Professed Religious, Adorers of the Blood of Christ	Monrovia
	Mary Joel Kolmer	1 March 1934; Waterloo, Illinois, United States	20 October 1992 between Gardnersville and Barnesville, Montserrado, Liberia	Professed Religious, Adorers of the Blood of Christ	Monrovia
	Shirley Kolmer	15 December 1930; Waterloo, Illinois, United States	23 October 1992; Gardnersville, Montserrado, Liberia	Professed Religious, Adorers of the Blood of Christ	Monrovia
	Agnes Mueller	18 November 1929; Bartelso, Illinois, United States	23 October 1992; Gardnersville, Montserrado, Liberia	Professed Religious, Adorers of the Blood of Christ	Monrovia
	Kathleen McGuire	28 December 1937; Ridgway, Illinois, United States	23 October 1992; Gardnersville, Montserrado, Liberia	Professed Religious, Adorers of the Blood of Christ	Monrovia
Individual Martyrdoms
	Juan de Padilla	c. 1490; Toledo, Spain	1542 near Herington, Kansas	Professed Priest, Franciscan Friars Minor	Salina
	Gilbert Du Thet	c. 1575; Chantelle, Allier, France	3 July 1613 near Ellsworth, Maine	Professed Priest, Jesuits	Portland
	Gabriel de la Ribourde	c. 1615; France	19 September 1680 near North Utica, Illinois	Professed Priest, Franciscan Friars Minor (Recollects)	Peoria
	Ann Glover	c. 1625; Ireland	16 November 1688; Boston, Massachusetts	Married Layperson	Boston
	Christopher Plunkett	1649; Fingal, Leinster, Ireland	1697 near Chesapeake, Virginia	Professed Priest, Franciscan Capuchins	Richmond
	Nicolas Foucault	c. 1664; Paris, France	July 1702 near Fort Adams, Mississippi	Priest, Paris Foreign Missions Society	Jackson
	Nicolas Benoit del Halle (rel. name: Constantin)	France	1 June 1706; Detroit, Michigan	Professed Priest, Franciscan Friars Minor (Recollects)	Detroit
	Jean-François Buisson de Saint-Cosme	30 January 1677; Lévis, Quebec, Canada	12 February 1706 near Donaldsonville, Louisiana	Diocesan Priest	Quebec and Baton Rouge
	Jacques Gravier	17 May 1651; Moulins, Allier, France	17 April 1708; Mobile, Alabama	Professed Priest, Jesuits	Mobile
	Jean Daniel Testu	Quebec, Canada	9 August 1718; New Orleans, Louisiana	Diocesan Priest	New Orleans
	Juan Minques	Spain	3 March 1720 at the Platte River, Nebraska	Professed Priest, Franciscan Friars Minor	Lincoln
	Sébastien Rale	20 January 1657; Pontarlier, Doubs, France	23 August 1724; Old Point, Madison, Maine	Professed Priest, Jesuits	Portland
	Jean-Pierre Aulneau de la Touche	21 April 1705; Moutiers-sur-le-Lay, Vendée, France	6 June 1736 near Fort Saint Charles, Angle Inlet, Minnesota	Professed Priest, Jesuits	Crookston
	Enrique Ruhen	16 June 1718; Börßum, Lower Saxony, Germany	23 November 1751; Sonoyta, Sonora, Mexico	Professed Priest, Jesuits	Tucson
	Charles John Seghers	26 December 1839; Ghent, Belgium	28 November 1886 near Nulato, Alaska	Archbishop of Oregon City	Portland in Oregon
	Patrick Heslin	1 August 1857; Killoe, Longford, Ireland	2 August 1921; Colma, San Mateo, California	Diocesan Priest	San Francisco
	James Edwin Coyle	23 March 1873; Drum, Roscommon, Ireland	11 August 1921; Birmingham, Alabama	Diocesan Priest	Birmingham
	Edward Proctor Whelan (rel. name: Peter Damian)	22 January 1908; Newark, New Jersey	23 December 1941; Happy Valley, Hong Kong	Professed Religious, Brothers of the Christian Schools (De La Salle Brothers)	Hong Kong
	James Gerald Hennessy	24 September 1905; Cambridge, Massachusetts	1 July 1942 aboard the SS Montevideo Maru, at the Luzon Strait, near Fuga Island, Cagayan, Philippines	Diocesan Priest	Boston
	Arthur Duhamel	19 October 1908; Lawrence, Massachusetts	3 September 1942; Ruavatu, Guadalcanal, Solomon Islands	Professed Priest, Society of Mary (Marist Missionaries)	Honiara
	Anna Ruholl (rel. name: Dolorosia)	6 December 1892; Lillyville, Illinois	27 March 1944; Jayapura, Papua, Indonesia	Professed Religious, Missionary Sisters Servants of the Holy Spirit	Jayapura
	Jesus Baza Dueñas	19 March 1911; Hagåtña, Guam	12 July 1944; Mangilao, Guam	Diocesan Priest	Agaña
	William Thomas Cummings	30 October 1903; San Francisco, California	28 January 1945 sea aboard a POW ship between Taiwan and Japan	Priest, Maryknoll Missionary Society	San Francisco
	Antoinette Kunkel (rel. name: Hyancinth)	21 December 1898; Glen Falls, New York	(disappeared); 5 April 1945; Benguet, Philippines	Professed Religious, Maryknoll Sisters of Saint Dominic	Baguio
	William Kruegler Hernberg	1 October 1930; Troy, New York	7 August 1962; Montero, Santa Cruz, Bolivia	Priest, Maryknoll Missionary Society	Santa Cruz de la Sierra
	Robert Raymond Brett	3 January 1936; Philadelphia, Pennsylvania	2 February 1968; Khe Sanh, Hướng Hoá, Quảng Trị, Vietnam	Professed Priest, Society of Mary (Marist Missionaries)	Hue
	Catherine Anne Cesnik	17 November 1942; Lawrenceville, Pittsburgh, Pennsylvania	(disappeared); 7 November 1969; Lansdowne, Maryland	Professed Religious, School Sisters of Notre Dame	Baltimore
	Renaud Bouffard	14 June 1931; Augusta, Maine	25 May 1971; Chardonnières, Haiti	Professed Priest, Missionary Oblates of Mary Immaculate	Port-au-Prince
	Daniel "Danny" Croteau	27 May 1959; Springfield, Massachusetts	14 April 1972; Springfield, Massachusetts	Child	Springfield
	Martin Cabo (rel. name: Marcellus)	2 June 1915; Chicago, Illinois	28 November 1974; Neopit, Wisconsin	Professed Priest, Franciscan Friars Minor	Green Bay
	Raymond Herman Pint	1 January 1930; Independence, Iowa	20 October 1975; Morochata, Cochabamba, Bolivia	Diocesan Priest	Dubuque
	William Woods	14 September 1931; Houston, Texas	11 November 1976; San Juan Cotzal, El Quiché, Guatemala	Priest, Maryknoll Missionary Society	Galveston–Houston
	James Francis Carney (rel. name: Guadalupe)	28 October 1924; Chicago, Illinois	August 1983; Yoro, Honduras	Professed Priest, Jesuits	Yoro
	Agnes Reinkemeyer	29 December 1923; Rich Fountain, Missouri	12 July 1989; Wema, Garsen, Tana River, Kenya	Professed Religious, Franciscan Sisters of Mary	Malindi
	Raymond Anthony Adams	25 May 1935; New York City, New York	12 November 1989; Cape Coast, Ghana	Professed Priest, Jesuits	Cape Coast
	Eugene John Hebert	9 October 1923; Jennings, Louisiana	(disappeared); 15 August 1990; Batticaloa, Eastern Province, Sri Lanka	Professed Priest, Jesuits	Batticaloa and Lake Charles
	Eliseo Castaño de Vega	10 November 1925; Vega de Tera, Zamora, Spain	31 August 1991; Río Piedras, San Juan, Puerto Rico	Priest, Congregation of the Mission (Vincentians)	San Juan de Puerto Rico
	Anne Patricia McAleese	23 March 1932; Elmhurst, Queens, New York	8 January 1996; Cape Coast, Ghana	Professed Religious, Sisters of the Presentation of the Blessed Virgin Mary of Newburgh	Cape Coast
	Thomas Gafney	28 November 1932; Cleveland, Ohio	28 October 1998; Kathmandu, Nepal	Professed Priest, Jesuits	Cleveland
	John Anthony Kaiser	19 June 1920; Medford, Massachusetts	13 January 2000; Kisumu, Kenya	Priest of the Mill Hill Missionaries	Kisumu
	Barbara Ann Ford	26 July 1938; Mount Kisco, New York	5 May 2001; Guatemala City, Guatemala	Professed Religious, Sisters of Charity of New York	Santiago de Guatemala
	Mary Frank Stachowicz	7 January 1951; Poland	13 November 2002; Chicago, Illinois	Married Layperson	Chicago

== 21st century ==
- José Gerónimo Lluberas Acosta (1923–2003), Married Layperson of the Diocese of Ponce (Ponce, Puerto Rico – Georgia, US)
- Michael Allen Gaworski (1958–2003), Founder of the Franciscan Brothers of Peace (Minnesota, US)
- Mary Philomena Fogarty (Mary Coirle) (1935–2003), Professed Religious of the Franciscan Missionaries of Mary (Cork, Ireland – Virginia, US)
- Matthew Joseph Thaddeus Stepanek (1990–2004), Child of the Archdiocese of Baltimore (Maryland, US)
- Zdisław Kobak (Cantius) (1930–2004), Professed Priest of the Franciscan Friars Minor (Torun, Poland – Samar, Philippines – Wisconsin, US)
- Daria Donnelly Weissburg (1959–2004), Married Layperson of the Archdiocese of Boston (Pennsylvania – Massachusetts, US)
- Robert Pennington (Basil) (1931–2005), Professed Priest of the Trappists (New York – Massachusetts, US)
- Venard Poslusney (1917–2005), Professed Priest of the Carmelites of the Ancient Observance (Pennsylvania – New Jersey, US)
- Thomas Richard Heath (1920–2005), Professed Priest of the Dominicans; Martyrs (Massachusetts, US – Kisumu, Kenya)
- Dorothy Mae Stang (1931–2005), Professed Religious of the Sisters of Notre Dame de Namur; Martyr (Ohio, US – Pará, Brazil)
- Patricia Caron Crowley (1913–2006), Married Layperson of the Archdiocese of Chicago; Founder of the Christian Family Movement (Illinois, US)
- Michael A. Monsoor (1981–2006), Layperson of the Diocese of Orange (California, US – Ramadi, Iraq)
- Edward Warren (1926–2006), Married Layperson of the Diocese of Bridgeport (Connecticut, US)
- Audrey Marie Santo (1983–2007), Young Layperson of the Diocese of Worcester (Massachusetts, US)
- Margaret Mary Leo (1993–2007), Child of the Diocese of Arlington (Virginia, US)
- Joan Gormley (Frances) (1937–2007), Vowed Member of the Daughters of Charity of Saint Vincent de Paul (Pennsylvania, US)
- Francis Marino (1925–2007), Professed Priest of the Society of Mary, Marist Missionaries; Founder of the Anawim Community (Massachusetts, US – Manila, Philippines)
- Avery Robert Dulles (1918–2008), Professed Priest of the Jesuits; Cardinal (New York, US)
- Cristeta Lim (Grace Dorothy) (1926–2008), Professed Religious of the Maryknoll Sisters of Saint Dominic (Ilocos Sur, Philippines – Hawaii, US)
- Joseph Vander Woude (1942–2008), Married Layperson of the Diocese of Arlington (South Dakota, US – Virginia, US)
- Dorothy Hennessey (1913–2008), Professed Religious of the Sisters of the Third Order of Saint Francis of the Holy Family (Iowa, US)
- Mary Ann Wright (1921–2009), Married Layperson of the Archdiocese of Santa Fe (Louisiana, US – California, US)
- Eunice Kennedy Shriver (1921–2009), Married Layperson of the Archdiocese of Baltimore (Maryland – Massachusetts, US)
- Lawrence Rosabaugh (Lorenzo) (1935–2009), Professed Priest of the Missionary Oblates of Mary Immaculate; Martyr (Wisconsin, US – Guatemala)
- Robert Fox (1927–2009), Priest of the Diocese of Sioux Falls; Founder of the Fatima Family Apostolate and the Youths for Fatima Pilgrimages (South Dakota, US)
- Patrick Francis Rager (1959–2010), Priest of the Diocese of Pittsburgh (Pennsylvania, US)
- Anita Figueredo Villegas de Doyle (1916–2010), Married Layperson of the Diocese of San Diego (San Jose, Costa Rica – California, US)
- Edward Dougherty (1925–2011), Priest of the Diocese of Trenton (Pennsylvania, US)
- Robert Sargent Shriver Jr. (1915–2011), Married Layperson of the Archdiocese of Baltimore (Maryland, US)
- Warren Hasty Carroll (1932–2011), Married Layperson of the Diocese of Arlington (Maine – Virginia, US)
- Philip Matthew Hannan (1914–2011), Archbishop of New Orleans (Washington D.C. – Louisiana, US)
- Julian and Adrian Riester (1919–2011) Professed Priests of the Franciscan Friars Minor (Buffalo, New York – St. Petersburg, Florida, US)
- Albert Henry Ottenweller (1916–2012), Bishop of Steubenville; Founder of the Franciscan Sisters of Penance of the Sorrowful Mother (Montana – Ohio, US)
- Walter Francis Sullivan (1928–2012), Bishop of Richmond (Washington, D.C. – Virginia, US)
- James Reuter (1916–2012), Professed Priest of the Jesuits (New Jersey, US – Parañaque, Philippines)
- Mary Jean Forge Perrini (1957–2012), Married Layperson of the Archdiocese of Kansas City (Kansas, US)
- Carol Therese Ameche (1934–2013), Married Layperson of the Diocese of Phoenix (Arizona, US)
- Thomas Walters (Hilarion) (1918–2013), Professed Priest of the Passionists (Pennsylvania, US – Quezon City, Philippines)
- Paul [Pablo] Straub (1932–2013), Professed Priest of the Redemptorists; Founder of the Institute of the Consecrated Sisters of the Most Holy Savior (New York, US – Quintana Roo, Mexico)
- Scott Carroll (1966–2013), Priest of the Diocese of Toledo (Ohio, US)
- Mary Clarke Brenner (Antonia) (1926–2013), Founder of the Eudists Servants of the Eleventh Hour (California, US – Tijuana, Mexico)
- Brendan Joseph Kelly (1998–2013), Child of the Diocese of Arlington (Virginia, US)
- Ignatius Anthony Catanello (1938–2013), Auxiliary Bishop of Brooklyn; Titular Bishop of Deultum (New York, US)
- Julia Ann Smollin (Anne Bryan) (1943–2014), Professed Religious of the Sisters of Saint Joseph of Carondelet (New York, US)
- Kenneth Walker (1985–2014), Priest of the Fraternal Society of Saint Peter; Martyr (Arizona, US)
- Robert Peter Groeschel (Benedict Joseph) (1933–2014), Professed Priest and Founder of the Franciscan Friars of the Renewal; Founder of the Franciscan Sisters of the Renewal (New Jersey, US)
- Nathan Benjamin Trapuzzano (1989–2014), Married Layperson of the Archdiocese of Indianapolis (Pennsylvania – Indiana, US)
- Pauline Eve Macaluso Lord (Penny) (1927–2014), Married Layperson of the Diocese of Little Rock (New York, US – Arkansas, US)
- Stuart Ignatius Long (1963–2014), Priest of the Diocese of Helena (Washington – Montana, US)
- Mary Jo Tacke (Mary Paule) (1923–2014), Professed Religious of the Missionary Sisters of the Precious Blood; Martyr (Idaho, US – Eastern Cape, South Africa)
- Paul Joseph O'Donnell (1959–2015), Cofounder of the Franciscan Brothers of Peace (Nebraska – Minnesota, US)
- Tom Seagrave (1942–2015), Priest of the Archdiocese of San Francisco (California, US)
- James Curran (1932–2015), Founder of the Little Brothers of Saint Francis (Massachusetts, US)
- Dorothy Marie Barrett (Mary Adrian) (1929–2015), Professed Religious of the Sisters Servants of the Immaculate Heart of Mary (Pennsylvania, US)
- Joseph Mario Reali (1989–2015), Young Layperson of the Archdiocese of New York; Member of the Knights of Columbus (Connecticut – New York, US)
- Alexander Joseph Toczko (1919–2015) and Jeannette Dolores Malachowski Toczko (1919–2015), Married Layperson of the Diocese of San Diego (California, US)
- Bob Lord (1935–2016), Married Layperson of the Diocese of Little Rock (New York, US – Arkansas, US)
- Rita Antoinette Rizzo (Mary Angelica of the Annunciation) (1923–2016), Professed Religious of the Poor Clares of Perpetual Adoration; Founder of the Franciscan Missionaries of the Eternal Word and the Knights of the Holy Eucharist (Ohio, US – Alabama, US)
- Peter John Hopkins (1925–2016), Married Layperson of the Diocese of Nashville (Wyoming – Tennessee, US)
- Daniel Berrigan (1921–2016), Professed Priest of the Jesuits (Minnesota – New York, US)
- Rosemae Pender (1921–2016), Founder of the Franciscan Sisters of the Eucharist (Illinois, US – Connecticut, US)
- Marvin Alfred Mottet (1930–2016), Priest of the Diocese of Davenport (Iowa, US)
- James Henry Flanagan (1924–2016), Priest of the Archdiocese of Santa Fe; Founder of the Society of Our Lady of the Most Holy Trinity (Massachusetts – New Mexico, US)
- Elizabeth Anne Corcoran (Mary Neil) (1926–2017), Professed Religious of the Religious Sisters of Mercy (Maryland, US)
- Vincent Michael Scanlan (Theophane) (1931–2017), Professed Priest of the Franciscan Third order Regulars (New York – Pennsylvania, US)
- Steven McDonald (1957–2017), Married Layperson of the Archdiocese of New York (New York, US)
- Elizabeth Louise Ebo (Mary Antona) (1924–2017), Professed Religious of the Franciscan Sisters of Mary (Illinois, US – Missouri, US)
- George Gillen (Francis Joseph) (1930–2017), Founder of the Brothers of Mercy of Saint John of God (Massachusetts, US – Bulacan, Philippines)
- Eileen Calcagni George (1927–2017), Married Layperson of the Diocese of Worcester (Massachusetts, US)
- Joseph Benedict Apostoli (Andrew) (1942–2017), Professed Priest and Cofounder of the Franciscan Friars of the Renewal (New Jersey, US)
- Jerome Francis Conicker (1938–2018), Married Layperson of the Diocese of Steubenville; Founder of the Apostolate for Family Consecration (Illinois, US – Wisconsin, US)
- Peter Fehlner (Peter Damian Mary) (1931–2018), Professed Priest of the Franciscan Conventuals (New York – Massachusetts, US)
- Anthony Freeman (1988–2018), Professed Religious of the Legionaries of Christ (Louisiana, US – Rome, Italy)
- Gregory Allen Staab (1957–2018), Professed Priest of the Oblates of the Virgin Mary (Ohio – Massachusetts, US)
- Linda Schubert (1936–2019), Married Layperson of the Diocese of San Jose in California; Member of the Catholic Charismatic Renewal (California, US)
- James Vincent Schall (1928–2019), Professed Priest of the Jesuits (Iowa – California, US)
- Lorraine Rita Moras Warren (1927–2019), Married Layperson of the Diocese of Bridgeport (Connecticut, US)
- Harold Joseph Rahm (1919–2019), Profesed Priest, Jesuits (Texas, US – São Paulo, Brazil)
- Kristin Popik Burns (1950–2019), Married Layperson of the Diocese of Arlington (Virginia, US)
- Richard Rieman (1925–2019), Priest of the Personal Prelature of the Holy Cross and Opus Dei (Illinois – Massachusetts, United States)
- Jason Paul Marshall (1966–2019), Seminarian of the Archdiocese of Santa Fe (New Mexico – Colorado, US)
- Mary Elizabeth Lancaster (Mary Wilhelmina of the Most Holy Rosary) (1924–2019), Cofounder of the Benedictine Sisters of Mary, Queen of Apostles (Missouri, US)
- Gilbert Espinosa Chávez (1932–2020), Auxiliary Bishop of San Diego (California, US)
- Ann Russell Miller (Mary Joseph of the Trinity) (1928–2021), Professed Religious of the Discalced Carmelite Nuns (California – Illinois, US)
- Ryan Stawaisz (1989–2021), Priest of the Archdiocese of Galveston-Houston (Scotland, United Kingdom – Texas, US)
- Janice McLaughlin (1942–2021), Professed Religious of the Maryknoll Sisters of Saint Dominic (Pennsylvania – New York, US)
- Alice Jourdain von Hildebrand (1923–2022), Married Layperson of the Archdiocese of New York (Brussels, Belgium – New York, US)
- Paul Farmer (1959–2022), Married Layperson of the Archdiocese of Boston (Massachusetts, US – Burera, Rwanda)
- Malachi Miller (2010–2023), Child of the Diocese of Salina (Kansas City- Kansas, US)
- Jessica Theresa Hanna (1983–2024), Married Layperson of the Archdiocese of Detroit (Michigan, US)
- Frank Caprio (1936–2025), Married Layperson of the Archdiocese of Hartford (Rhode Island, US)

== See also ==
- Catholic Church in the United States § Servants of God and those declared venerable, beatified, and canonized saints
- Congregation for the Causes of Saints
- List of venerated Americans
- List of post-reformation saints in Ireland
- Servant of God
- Venerable
