= Gordon Murphy (disambiguation) =

Gordon Murphy was an American Jesuit priest and missionary in India.

Gordon Murphy may also refer to:

- Gord Murphy, ice hockey player
- Gordon Murphy, character in Revenge (TV series)

== Similar spelling ==
- Geordan Murphy, Irish rugby union player
