= Archdiocese of Nanning =

Roman Catholic archdiocese in China

Coordinates: 22.8468°N 108.3380°E

Archdiocese of Nanning Archidioecesis Nannimensis 天主教南宁总教区
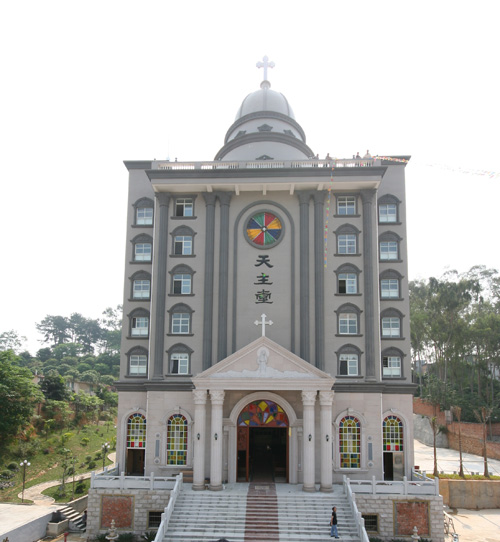
- Cathedral of Our Lady of China

Location
- Country: China
- Ecclesiastical province: Nanning

Statistics
- Population: Total; Catholics: (as of 1950); 6,000,000; 7,584 (0.7%)

Information
- Rite: Latin Rite
- Cathedral: Cathedral of Our Lady of China in Nanning

Current leadership
- Pope: Leo XIV
- Metropolitan Archbishop: Joseph Tan Yanquan

Map
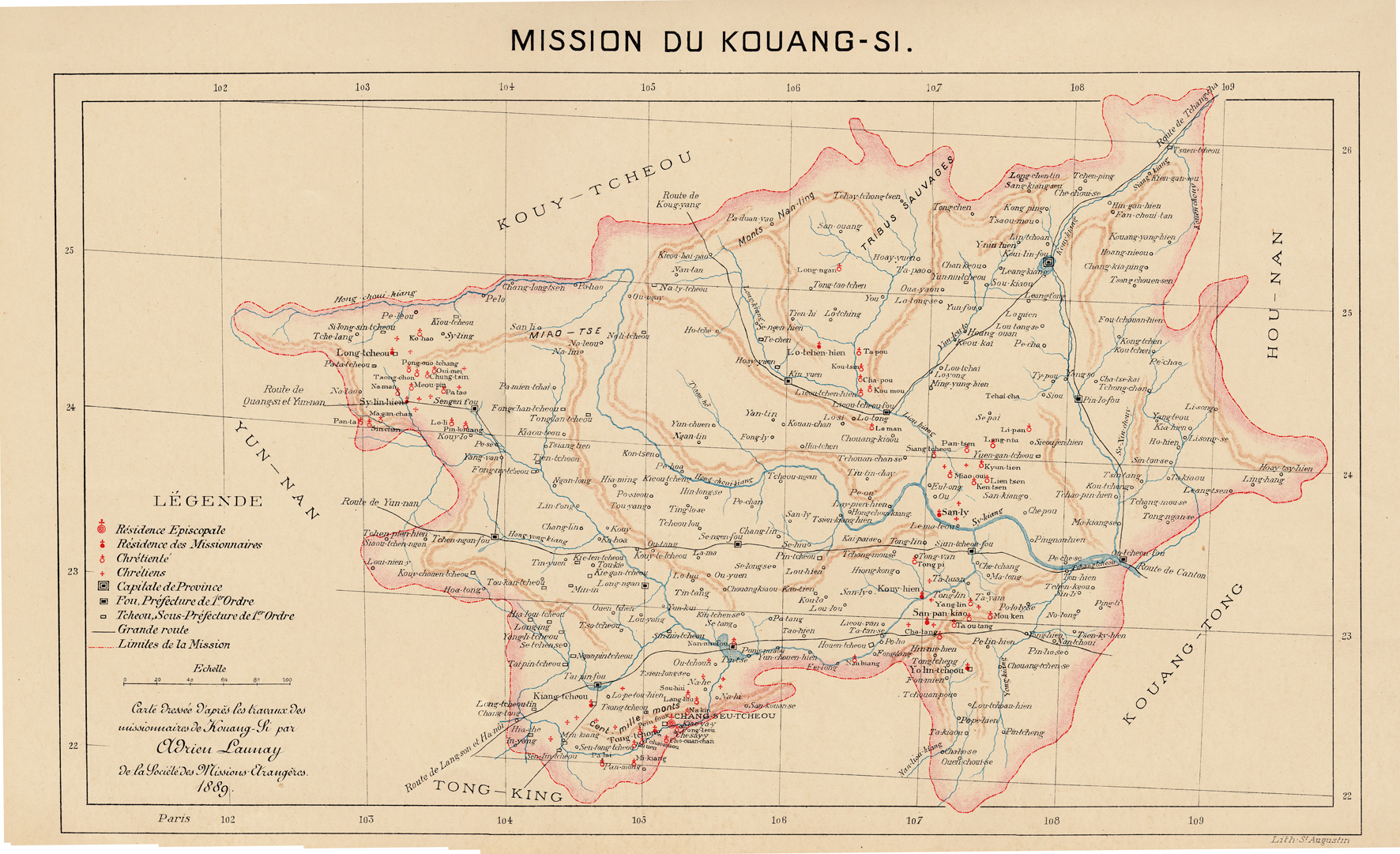
- Map of Kwanghsi Mission, prepared by Adrien Launay, 1889.

The Roman Catholic Archdiocese of Nanning (Latin: Nannimen(sis), Chinese: 南寧) is an archdiocese located in the city of Nanning (Guangxi) in China.

== History ==
- August 6, 1875: Established as Apostolic Prefecture of Guangxi 廣西 from the Apostolic Vicariate of Guangdong 廣東
- June 6, 1914: Promoted as Apostolic Vicariate of Guangxi 廣西
- December 3, 1924: Renamed as Apostolic Vicariate of Nanning 南寧
- April 11, 1946: Promoted as Metropolitan Archdiocese of Nanning 南寧

== Leadership ==
- Archbishops of Nanning (Roman rite)
  - Archbishop Joseph Tan Yanquan (2007–present)
  - Archbishop Joseph Meng Ziwen (1984 - 2007)
  - Archbishop Paulin-Joseph-Justin Albouy, M.E.P. (沈士杰) (April 11, 1946 – February 7, 1954)
- Vicars Apostolic of Nanning 南寧 (Roman Rite)
  - Bishop Paulin-Joseph-Justin Albouy, M.E.P. (沈士杰) (later Archbishop) (June 30, 1930 – April 11, 1946)
  - Bishop Maurice-François Ducoeur, M.E.P. (刘志忠) (April 6, 1914 – June 10, 1929)
- Prefects Apostolic of Guangxi (Kuamsi) 廣西 (Roman Rite)
  - Bishop Maurice-François Ducoeur, M.E.P. (刘志忠) (December 22, 1910 – April 6, 1914)
  - Bishop Joseph-Marie Lavest, M.E.P. (罗惠良) (April 26, 1900 – August 23, 1910)
  - Bishop Jean-Benoît Chouzy, M.E.P. (司立修) (August 21, 1891 – September 22, 1899)
  - Bishop Pierre-Noël-Joseph Foucard, M.E.P. (富于道) (August 13, 1878 – March 31, 1889)
  - Fr. Aloysius Jolly, M.E.P. (文芍理) (1875–1878)

== Suffragan dioceses ==
- Wuzhou 梧州

== Sources ==
- GCatholic.org
- Catholic Hierarchy
