= Jean-Benoît Chouzy =

Most Reverend Jean-Benoît Chouzy
- Prefect of Kuamsi; Titular Bishop of Petnelissus
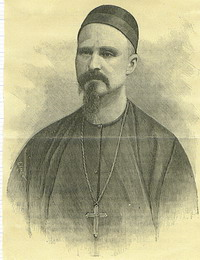
- Church: Catholic Church
- Diocese: Prefecture Apostolic of Kuamsi
- In office: 1891–1899
- Predecessor: Pierre-Noël-Joseph Foucard
- Successor: Joseph-Marie Lavest

Orders
- Consecration: 22 November 1891 by Augustin Chausse

Personal details
- Born: 5 March 1837 Panissières, France
- Died: 22 September 1899 (age 62)

Jean-Benoît Chouzy, M.E.P. (1837–1899) (Chinese: 司立修) was a Roman Catholic prelate who served as Prefect of Kuamsi (1891–1899) and Titular Bishop of Petnelissus (1891–1899).

== Biography ==
Jean-Benoît Chouzy was born in on 5 March 1837 in Panissières, France, and ordained a priest in the La Société des Missions Etrangères in 1859. On 21 August 1891, he was appointed during the papacy of Pope Leo XIII as Titular Bishop of Petnelissus and Prefect of Kuamsi. On 22 November 1891, he was consecrated bishop in Hong Kong by Augustin Chausse, Titular Bishop of Capsus, with Giovanni Timoleone Raimondi, Titular Bishop of Achantus and Salvador Masot y Gómez, Titular Bishop of Hauara, serving as co-consecrators. He served as Prefect of Kuamsi until his death on 22 September 1899.

Catholic Church titles
Preceded by	Titular Bishop of Petnelissus; 1891–1899	Succeeded by Thomas Broderick
Preceded by Pierre-Noël-Joseph Foucard	Prefect of Kuamsi; 1891–1899	Succeeded by Joseph-Marie Lavest
