= Pierre-Noël-Joseph Foucard =

French missionary

Most Reverend Pierre-Noël-Joseph Foucard
- Titular Bishop of Zela; Prefect Apostolic of Kuamsi
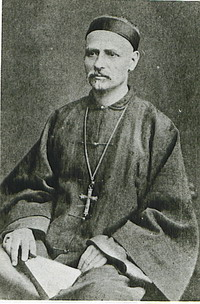
- Church: Catholic Church
- Diocese: Prefecture Apostolic of Kuamsi
- In office: 1878–1889
- Predecessor: Father Aloysius Jolly
- Successor: Jean-Benoît Chouzy

Personal details
- Born: 24 December 1830 Olivet, France
- Died: 31 March 1889 (age 58) China

Pierre-Noël-Joseph Foucard, M.E.P. or Pierre-Noël-Joseph Foucart (1830–1889) (Chinese: 富于道) was a Roman Catholic prelate who served as Prefect Apostolic of Kuamsi (1878–1889) and Titular Bishop of Zela (1878–1889).

== Biography ==
Pierre-Noël-Joseph Foucard was born in Olivet, France on 24 December 1830 and ordained a priest in the La Société des Missions Etrangères. On 13 August 1878, he was appointed during the papacy of Pope Leo XIII as Prefect Apostolic of Kuamsi and Titular Bishop of Zela. On 23 March 1879, he was consecrated bishop by François-Eugène Lions, Titular Bishop of Basilinopolis. He served as Prefect Apostolic of Kuamsi until his death on 31 March 1889.

While bishop, he was the principal consecrator of Augustin Chausse, Coadjutor Prefect of Kouangtong and Titular Bishop of Capsus (1881).

Catholic Church titles
Preceded by Manuel María León González y Sánchez	Titular Bishop of Zela; 1878–1889	Succeeded by Laurent Blettery
Preceded by Father Aloysius Jolly	Prefect Apostolic of Kuamsi; 1878–1889	Succeeded by Jean-Benoît Chouzy
