= Diocese of Wuzhou =

Roman Catholic diocese in China

Diocese of Wuzhou Dioecesis Uceuvensis 天主教梧州教区
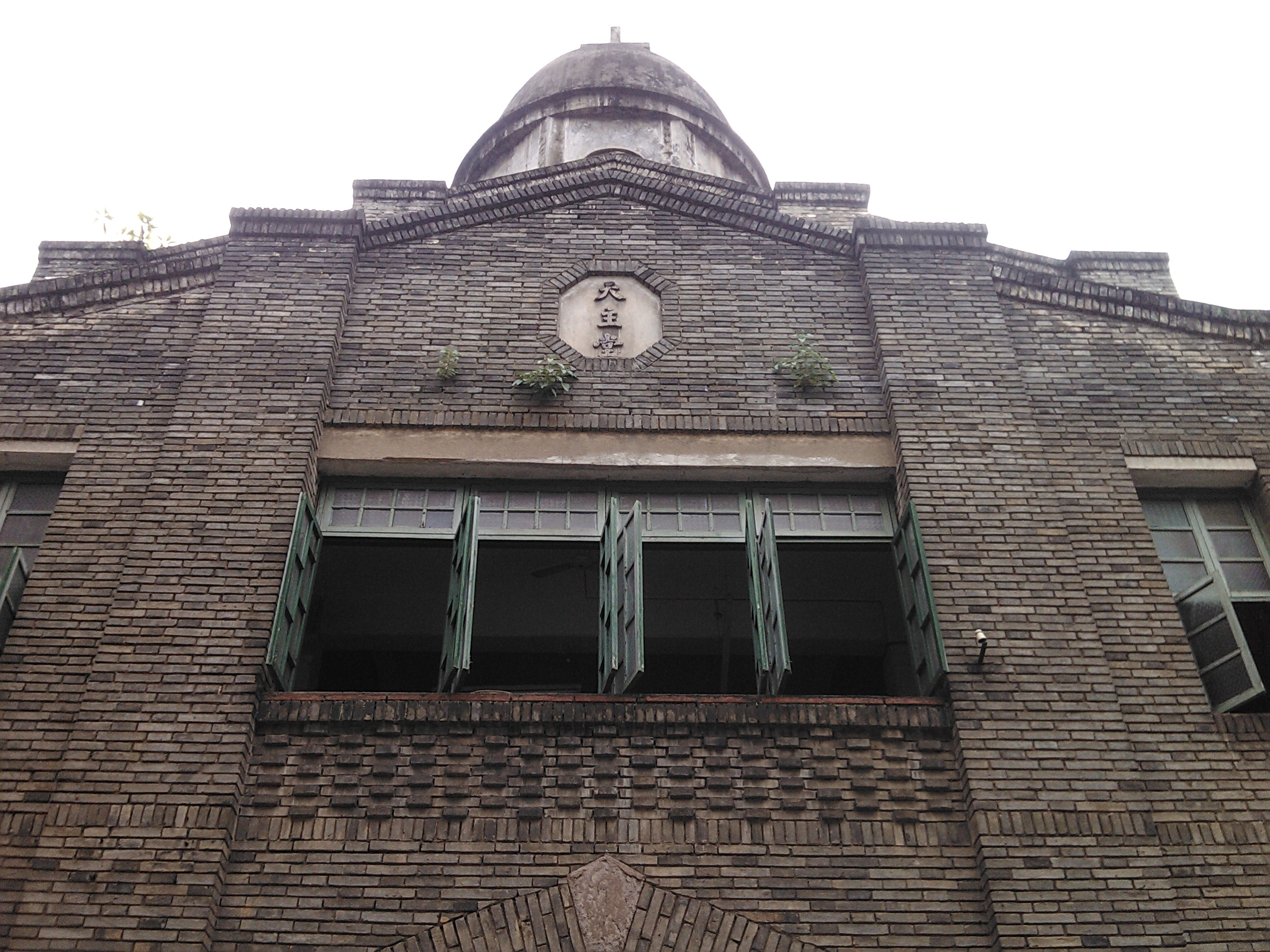
- Cathedral of Wuzhou

Location
- Country: China
- Ecclesiastical province: Nanning
- Metropolitan: Nanning
- Coordinates: 23°30′N 111°18′E

Statistics
- Population: Total; Catholics: (as of 1950); 3,549,090; 19,871 (0.6%)

Information
- Rite: Latin Rite
- Cathedral: Cathedral in Wuzhou

Current leadership
- Pope: Leo XIV
- Bishop: Sede Vacante
- Metropolitan Archbishop: Joseph Tan Yanquan

The Roman Catholic Diocese of Wuzhou (Latin: Uceuven(sis), Chinese: 梧州, 蒼梧) is a diocese located in the city of Wuzhou (Guangxi) in the Roman Catholic Archdiocese of Nanning in China.

== History ==
- June 30, 1930: Established as Mission "sui iuris" of Wuzhou 梧州 from the Apostolic Vicariate of Nanning 南寧
- December 10, 1934: Promoted as Apostolic Prefecture of Wuzhou 梧州
- July 20, 1939: Promoted as Apostolic Vicariate of Wuzhou 梧州
- April 11, 1946: Promoted as Diocese of Wuzhou 梧州

== Leadership ==
- Ecclesiastical Superiors of Wuzhou 梧州
  - Fr. Bernard F. Meyer, M.M. (马奕猷) (October 30, 1931 – December 10, 1934)
- Prefects Apostolic of Wuzhou 梧州 (Roman Rite)
  - Fr. Bernard F. Meyer, M.M. (马奕猷) (December 10, 1934 – 1939)
- Vicars Apostolic of Wuzhou 梧州 (Roman Rite)
  - Bishop Frederick Anthony Donaghy, M.M. (唐汝琪) (July 20, 1939 – April 11, 1946)
- Bishops of Wuzhou 梧州
  - Bishop Frederick Anthony Donaghy, M.M. (唐汝琪) (April 11, 1946 – 1983)
