= Joseph Meng Ziwen =

- Bishop of Nanning
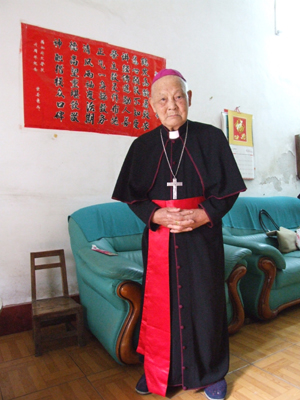
- Native name: 蒙子文
- Church: Catholic Church
- Archdiocese: Archdiocese of Nanning
- In office: 24 February 1984 – 7 January 2007
- Predecessor: Paulin-Joseph-Justin Albouy
- Successor: Joseph Tan Yanquan

Orders
- Ordination: 12 April 1935
- Consecration: 24 February 1984 by Paulin-Joseph-Justin Albouy

Personal details
- Born: 19 March 1903 Hengling, Gui County, Guangxi, Great Qing
- Died: 7 January 2007 (aged 103) Nanning, Guangxi, China

Joseph Meng Ziwen (Chinese: 蒙子文; pinyin: Méng Zǐwén; 19 March 1903 – 7 January 2007) was a Chinese Catholic bishop. He spent twenty five years in a labor camp. His position as bishop was limited to the "underground church" as it was not officially recognized because it came from the Holy See. However, the government did recognize him as a priest of the Chinese Patriotic Catholic Association, which was useful in allowing him to aid Catholic interests.
