= Vega de Tera =

Coordinates: 42°00′N 6°07′W

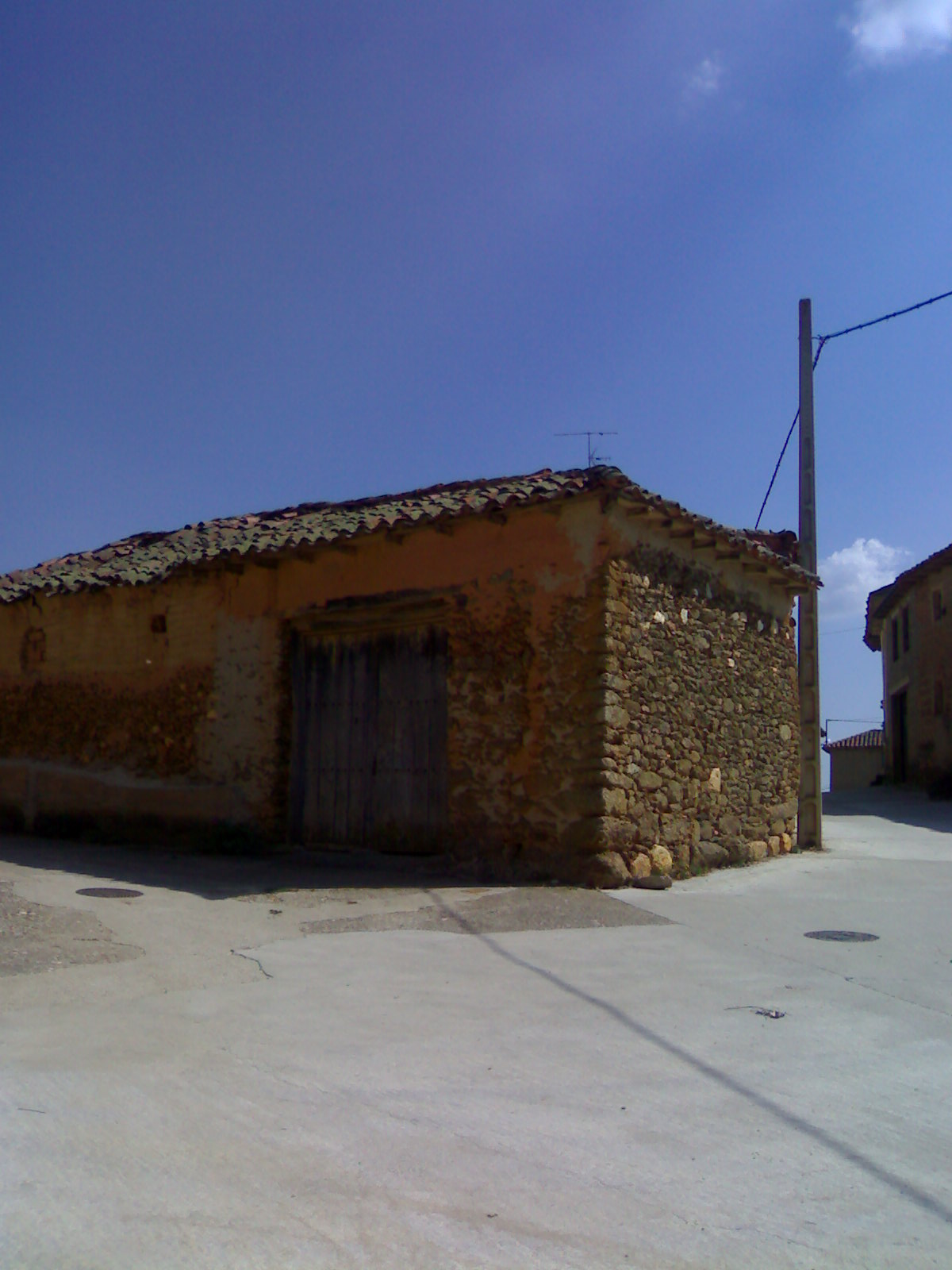
- Interactive map of Vega de Tera
- Country: Spain
- Autonomous community: Castile and León
- Province: Zamora
- Municipality: Vega de Tera

Area
  - Total: 44 km^{2} (17 sq mi)

Population (2025-01-01)
  - Total: 265
  - Density: 6.0/km^{2} (16/sq mi)
- Time zone: UTC+1 (CET)
  - Summer (DST): UTC+2 (CEST)
- Website: Official website

Vega de Tera is a municipality located in the province of Zamora, Castile and León, Spain. According to the 2004 census (INE), the municipality has a population of 470 inhabitants.

== Geography ==
Integrated in the region of Benavente and Los Valles, it is located 79 kilometers from the provincial capital. The municipal area is crossed by the Autovía de las Rías Bajas A-52 and the national road N-525 between pK 34 and 46. Its municipal area includes three other localities:

- Calzada de Tera with a parish church in honor of San Jorge and hermitage dedicated to San Vicente Mártir, its two most important monuments. It is located 4 km from Vega de Tera, where the town hall is.
- Junquera de Tera with its well-known 'El Rollo' square and on the other side of the road, its park and church. 3 km from Vega de Tera.
- Milla de Tera, located 4 km from Vega de Tera and a scarce kilometer from Junquera and which, like this one, has its most outstanding building in its parish church.

The relief of the municipality is predominantly flat, being characterized by the valley of the Tera river, which runs through the southeast of the municipality from west to east, including part of the Nuestra Señora del Agavanzal reservoir. The north of the municipality is somewhat more irregular, with scattered elevations. The altitude of the territory ranges from 855 meters at an elevation to the west to 736 meters on the banks of the Tera River. The town stands 749 meters above sea level.

== History ==
In the Middle Ages, the territory in which the town sits was integrated into the Kingdom of León, whose monarchs would have undertaken the founding of the town.

Later, in the Modern Age, Vega de Tera was one of the towns that were integrated in the province of the Lands of the Count of Benavente and within this in the reception of Benavente.

However, when the provinces were restructured and the current ones were created in 1833, the town became part of the province of Zamora, within the Leonese Region, being integrated in 1834 into the judicial district of Benavente.

== Demographics ==
Historical population

Year	Pop.	±%
1900	1,171	—
1910	1,227	+4.8%
1920	1,275	+3.9%
1930	1,241	−2.7%
1940	1,287	+3.7%
1950	1,301	+1.1%

Year	Pop.	±%
1960	1,214	−6.7%
1970	991	−18.4%
1981	775	−21.8%
1991	629	−18.8%
1996	549	−12.7%
2001	496	−9.7%

Year	Pop.	±%
2005	459	−7.5%
2011	406	−11.5%
2013	391	−3.7%
2017	360	−7.9%

== Parties ==
On January 17, the festival of San Antonio is celebrated. Every year, a neighbor is in charge of covering the expenses, which they call a butler. To do this, he collects money or offerings from each neighbor, which are auctioned to obtain the money necessary to pay for religious acts and other activities. Neighbors are invited to wine and pickle in the town square.

The patronal party is on June 26, San Pelayo, who is honored with a solemn mass with a procession of the Saint through one of the streets of the town that leads to "the source", bordering it and returning to the church through another of the streets. In the afternoon, some years the regional dance groups, coming from the capital, were a tradition. At night a music group enlivens the festival.

During the second week of August the "San Facundo Cultural Association", made up of residents of the town, mostly who reside in Madrid, the Basque Country, Catalonia or Valladolid during the year, through their private contributions and without having any financial support from the City Council, organizes various activities, including traditional games (the "bald", which is the most traditional, the frog, petanque, tito de olituna throwing, ...), board games (chess, Parcheesi, checkers, cards, ... etc) and the traditional "tute" and "brisca" contest, with participants from different towns in the region, traditional card games in the area. In addition, sports competitions are organized for all ages (ping-pong, football, paddle tennis, volleyball, water polo in the pool ...), routes to do walking, cycling, quads, ... Throughout this week, too They are common, the realization of dinners in the open air, usually with game meat cooked by means of traditional recipes over a wood fire of holm oak, rockrose and vine shoots, the omelette contest made with free-range eggs and potatoes from the area where they participate the residents of the town voluntarily. The performance of a musical group and the presence of various tombola and bouncy castles on Thursday of the Cultural Week put a note to the Cultural Week. Thanks to these August festivities, paid in full by private contributions from its partners, the town has been revitalized, making the second week of August an obligatory appointment for all those who reside in other places and wish to continue cultivating and still maintaining its roots with Vega de Tera. Children and young people want to come these holidays to meet their friends with origins in Vega de Tera, or with the few who still reside there throughout the year, with Vega de Tera being a vacation destination for most of them, of all ages.

== See also ==
- Benavente
- Benavente and Los Valles
- Mancomunidad de Servicios Valle del Tera
- Geographical indication of Valles de Benavente
