= Panissières =

- Commune
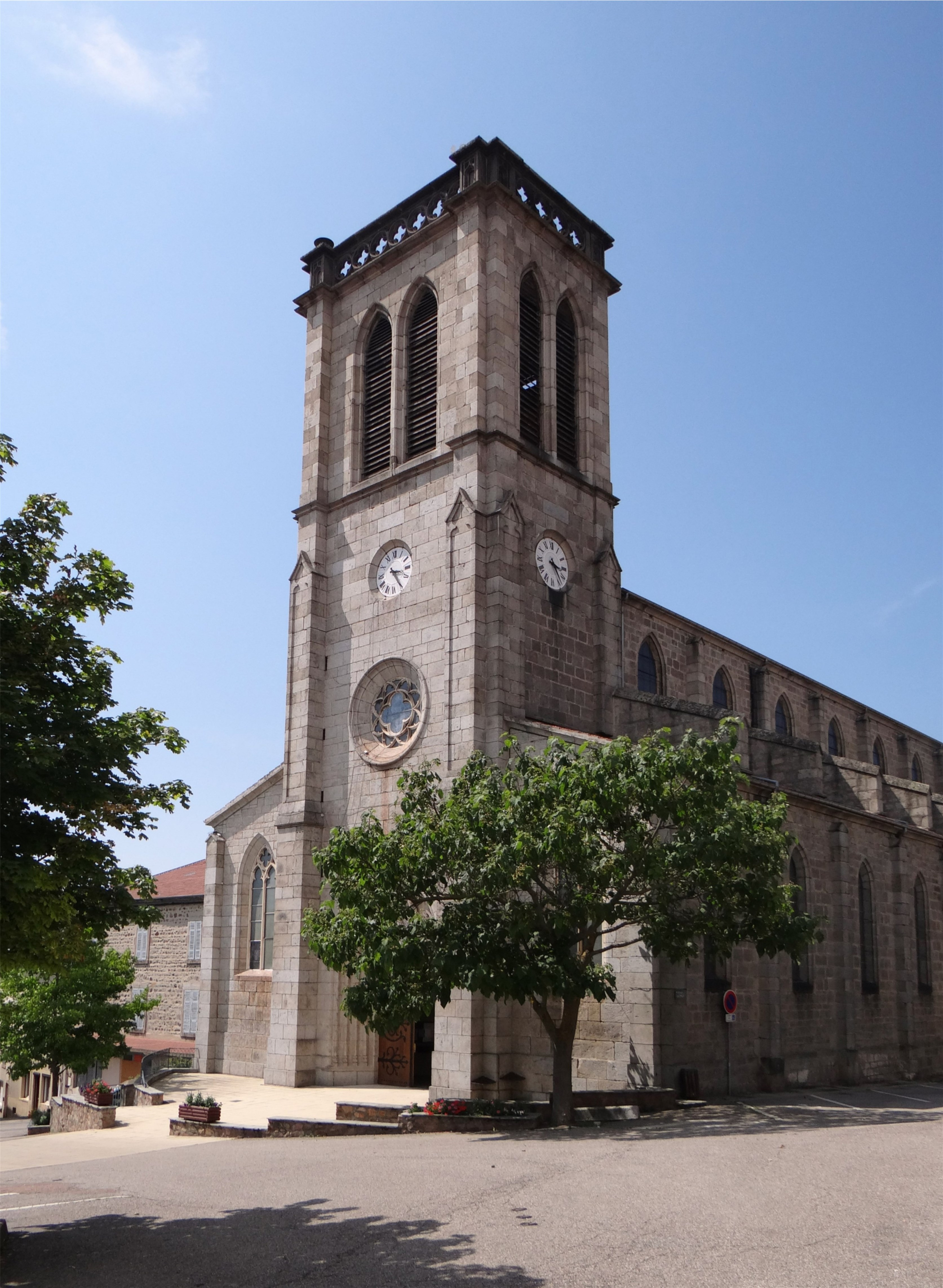

- Coat of arms
- Location of Panissières
- Location within France Location within Auvergne-Rhône-Alpes
- Coordinates: 45°47′32″N 4°20′36″E
- Country: France
- Region: Auvergne-Rhône-Alpes
- Department: Loire
- Arrondissement: Montbrison
- Canton: Feurs

Government
  - Mayor (2020–2026): Christian Mollard
- Area^{1}: 26.71 km^{2} (10.31 sq mi)
- Elevation: 641 m (2,103 ft)
- Highest elevation: 835 m (2,740 ft)
- Lowest elevation: 426 m (1,398 ft)
- Population (2023): 2,911
  - Density: 109.0/km^{2} (282.3/sq mi)
- Time zone: UTC+01:00 (CET)
  - Summer (DST): UTC+02:00 (CEST)
- INSEE/Postal code: 42165 /42360
- ^{1} French Land Register data, which excludes lakes, ponds, glaciers > 1 km^{2} (0.386 sq mi or 247 acres) and river estuaries.

Panissières (French pronunciation: [panisjɛʁ]) is a commune in the Loire department in central France.

== Population ==
Historical population

Year	Pop.	±% p.a.
1793	3,000	—
1821	4,022	+1.05%
1846	4,039	+0.02%
1872	4,636	+0.53%
1901	4,488	−0.11%
1926	3,632	−0.84%
1946	3,126	−0.75%
1962	3,412	+0.55%
1968	3,276	−0.68%

Year	Pop.	±% p.a.
1975	3,046	−1.03%
1982	2,903	−0.68%
1990	2,867	−0.16%
1999	2,860	−0.03%
2007	2,853	−0.03%
2012	2,958	+0.73%
2017	2,929	−0.20%
2023	2,911	−0.10%

Source: EHESS and INSEE (1968–2023)

== See also ==
- Communes of the Loire department
