= Penny Lord =

American Catholic media figure

Penny Eve Lord
- Born: Pauline Eve Macaluso; 23 September 1928; Brooklyn, New York, United States
- Died: 21 January 2014 (aged 85); Morrilton, Arkansas
- Known for: Eternal Word Television Network

Pauline "Penny" Lord (born Pauline Eve Macaluso; September 23, 1928 - January 21, 2014) was a Catholic media figure who, along with her husband Bob, hosted many television series on Eternal Word Television Network. Their main focus was on promoting the lives of Catholic saints and travel videos to international Catholic shrines and pilgrimages.

== Background ==
Lord was born on September 23, 1928, in a religious Italian household in Brooklyn, New York. Her father was a civil servant and her mother was a sewing-machine operator for a clothing factory in New York City.

Lord was taught the major Catholic prayers in Italian before she was six by her grandmother. Later her mother wanting to assimilate with the Protestant majority culture, put the crucifix and statues of the saints away. The Catholic saints were no longer invoked and all prayers were directed straight to Jesus.

Lord began her schooling at a public school in Brooklyn, but graduated from Richmond Hill High School after the family relocated to the borough of Queens. There she joined the Arista Society which recognized outstanding honor students.

== Higher education and marriage ==
Lord attended Davis and Elkins College in Elkins, West Virginia with an intent to study law in Chicago. Her interests shifted and she went to the American Academy of Dramatic Arts in New York City. When she played a role made famous by Penny Singleton, she was given the nickname "Penny" which she adopted permanently. There she also met fellow student Bob Lord while celebrating her birthday in 1957. A romance developed and they were married on December 21, 1958. The couple moved to California. They would later have several children including their son Richard who died young in 1971 from a drug overdose.

== Loss of faith ==
Bob and Penny were raised Catholic with Bob going through Catholic schooling while Penny had one year of catechism for one hour every week, but reflecting upon it later held that they "did not have a synthesis" between head and heart, "we either had an emotional relationship or a cerebral relationship".

Lord recalled to an interviewer about a crisis that caused her faith to lapse. When their son was struggling to hold onto life Lord prayed to Jesus saying, "Lord you take over", when he died later that night Lord was angry returning to prayer to castigate Jesus saying, "You knew what I meant, you knew I didn't mean for you to take him away from me. ...Well you're some fine kind of god you are, you put us on earth and here we are our children are dying like flies." She recalled to an interviewer that at that point, "I could not love Him any more. I refused to." The Lords had never known tragedy before and had "expected Jesus was going to change everything, so that it wasn't going to happen." Lord had been raised with the unbroken tradition of "daddy always saying the Lord's prayer at table," but with the death of their son, both she and Bob vowed to never say the prayer again; "We said, 'We don't trust You anymore.'"

Recalling his wife's reaction during this time, Bob stated, "Penny was just so hurt with Jesus. She loved Him like a child, emotionally, and, when she believed that He had betrayed her, she was completely hurt and there was no reconciliation between the two of them." Lord, who maintained that "I adored him always," relayed that she was so angry at Jesus that "I told Him that He didn't exist."

Penny also blamed a priest for what happened to her son, saying, "With our son, when we first found out that he was smoking marijuana, we turned to the young priest whom my son idolized, my son was the head of the youth group. And we turned to him for help because we thought our son would listen to him. And he said, 'I am not a psychologist. He needs a psychologist.' That was the beginning of the end, going to a psychologist. These were the hurts."

The Lords recalled that at this time their inability to communicate their pain over their son's death to one another was affecting their marriage. "We were growing apart. ...We were grieving separately. ...[Our marriage] Was falling apart. ...We would talk about many things but we would never talk about each other. ...We would never talk about emotions between the two of us. ...I didn't want to hurt him. If he saw me grieving, I was afraid he would be hurt, and he didn't want to hurt me. We were growing terribly apart.

== Religious renewal ==
Due to the death of their son the Lords had lapsed in their faith until on January 1, 1975 Bob Lord felt moved to return. Previously he had felt a desire to return, "I started to hunger for the Church that I had left. Willingly left it. But now did I do the right thing. I was really sorry about having left the Church. I am not trying to rationalize any of it, but I just missed Jesus. And mostly I missed him in the Eucharist."

In their grief over their son's death the Lords held that the holidays were the worst as they could not fully avoid memories of him. At that New Year day in 1975 their daughter and grandson came over, and later they found themselves watching football just to avoid talking about their relationship. While Bob was cleaning the dishes, he decided that he "really wanted to go back to Church" and decided that "it was time to come home." Bob called the local priest and found out what time Mass was and with this information asked his wife what she thought of going to Mass every day. Penny Lord, after recovering from the shock, reflected on the idea and recalled that Bob had gone to Mass with her for eighteen years so agreed to go for the first time "after three years and a couple of months".

They attended Catholic Mass at the Feast of the Solemnity of Mary, Penny Lord accompanied him despite initial misgivings. During the Mass at the sign of peace the Lords turned to each other. Bob was weeping over how the elements of the Mass seemed so beautiful to him while Penny was weeping over her anger at Jesus for not saving her son and whom she now worried was leading Bob "to divorce me and become a priest." She would later point to this worry as a proof of how lacking her education in the faith had been. Penny went to the Mass with Bob for six months but did not have the same feelings about the experience as he did, going with him because she "didn't want to lose my husband."

The Lords were advised by a fellow parishioner named Anthony about the Catholic program "Marriage Encounter". They attended a Marriage Encounter retreat in May 1975 in Santa Barbara that rededicated them to their Catholic faith, which had diminished in reaction to the early death of their son. The Marriage Encounter introduced the Lords to the Catholic doctrine that Marriage was a vocation and had sacramental graces, this new outlook for the Lords returned them to their faith - "That was our turning point."

=== Pilgrimages ===
Believing they were being spiritually led to make a pilgrimage to the Holy Land and Europe, they toured Catholic sites in these areas. This experience caused them to want to visit more Catholic shrines especially those held to have been locations of Eucharistic miracles.

They became pilgrimage directors in 1975 and founded Journeys of Faith ministry in 1980. The Lords also began a travel agency that led tours to Catholic pilgrimage sites.

== Career ==
When business at the travel agency fell off due to the rise of terrorism in the Middle East, Penny told her husband that she felt spiritually called to write a book about Eucharistic miracles. With his cooperation she co-wrote This Is My Body; This Is My Blood: Miracles of the Eucharist which went on to sell more than 300,000 copies.

With the funds from the successful book the Lords began a worldwide ministry of Catholic evangelization using video communications media. The success of the book also earned the attention of Mother Angelica and EWTN who interviewed them in December 1986. Afterwards the Lords began making many television series for EWTN about additional books they wrote and their pilgrimages. Lord and her husband "co-hosted more than 200 television programs, most often filmed at shrines, sanctuaries and other pilgrimage sites." Doug Keck, president of EWTN reflecting on their work stated "They have done more single-handedly to promote the lives of the saints than anyone else in the last 50 years." The Lords frequented EWTN events including the 2013 Family Celebration in Birmingham, Alabama.

In total, Lord and her husband wrote 25 books on Catholic topics including We Came Back to Jesus, The Journey and the Dream, and Heroes — Popes in Hard Times.

In 2000 Lord and her husband, responding to the perception that she was being spiritually directed to do so, built Holy Family Mission in Morrilton, Arkansas. There on 83 acres of donated land they built a retreat center and a replica of the Holy House of Loreto.

In 2001 Lord and her husband won the Poverello Award from Franciscan University of Steubenville. They have also won an award from the Polish Film Festival for a documentary of St. Maximilian Kolbe.

== Death ==
Lord died the night of January 21, 2014, at 8:32 p.m., finally succumbing to a prolonged illness. Bob Lord died on Feb. 13, 2016.
