= Apostolic Prefecture of Kwang-si =

The Prefecture Apostolic of Kwang-si (now spelled Guangxi, Latin: Praefectura Apostolica Kwangsiensis) was a Roman Catholic missionary jurisdiction.

== History ==
The mission of Guangxi comprised the entire Chinese imperial province of that name, a very mountainous and extremely poor region. The province had a population of about ten million divided among several distinct ethnicities, the most remarkable of whom were settlers from Guangzhou (Canton), the Hakkas and the Yao people and Miao people.

The first missionary to Guangxi was the Jesuit priest Michele de Ruggieri, who in 1583 endeavoured without success to establish himself at the capital, Guilin. Fifty years later the Franciscan, Francesco d'Escalone, arrived at Wuzhou.

In the middle of the seventeenth century, Andrew Xavier Koffler built a church at Guilin and was baptized at Nanning, under the name of Constantine, a son of the Yongli Emperor of the Southern Ming dynasty. Michel Boym laboured in company with Koffler. In 1692, Jacques Duval laboured to give further impulse to the work of his predecessors, and then came Chamaya and Lopez.

At the same time the Spanish Augustinians established themselves at Guilin and Wuzhou, and the Franciscans in Pingle County. All Catholic missionaries were expelled in 1724 by Yongzheng Emperor. No Catholic missionaries visited Guangxi for one hundred and thirty years.

In 1848 Guangxi, united to the mission of Guangdong, was confided to the Paris Society of Foreign Missions. In 1854, Auguste Chapdelaine first entered the province from Guizhou, but was arrested and thrown into prison in Xilin County ten days after his arrival. Liberated after 16 or 18 days of captivity, he ministered until 1856. He baptized several hundred catechumens, but was again arrested and taken to Xilin County, where he was sentenced to death and executed on 29 February of the same year, along with Laurence Pe-mu and Agnes Tsau-kong.

In 1866, several Catholic missionaries again entered Guangxi, but were unable to stay long. In 1868, Simon-Jude-Alphonse Mihière was appointed superior to the mission of Guangxi, but died in 1871. Under his direction several missionaries were able to enter the province. Among them was Joseph Foucard, who evangelized Shangsi County while pretending to be a wood-cutter to avoid arousing the suspicions of mandarin officials.

On 6 August 1875, Pius IX made Guangxi a prefecture Apostolic, and placed it under the authority of Louis Jolly, previously missionary in Guangdong. At this same period were founded the districts of Gui County and of the "hundred thousand mountains" among the Yao people.

Jolly died in 1878, and Foucard was made titular Bishop of Zela and Prefect Apostolic of Guangxi. The Chinese authorities placed many obstacles in the way of the missionaries. Foucard was obliged to proceed personally to Beijing and demand justice, but he obtained no satisfaction. The Sino-French War of 1884 served to increase the difficulties of this mission. Joseph Lavest and Jean Pernet were subjected to cruel treatment and several Christian communities were uprooted. Only the communities established at Xilin County experienced relative tranquility.

Foucard died in 1878 and was succeeded by Jean-Benoît Chouzy. Under the direction of the new prefect, other communities were established, and finally a certain measure of liberty was accorded to the missionaries. Often, however, sudden revolts seriously interfered with their labours. Two missionaries, Frédéric Mazel and Mathieu Bertholet, were massacred in different districts.

In 1899, Chouzey died, and in the following year Lavest undertook the mission. During the Boxer Rebellion all but three missions and a few other houses belonging to the Christians were pillaged. Lavest subsequently moved his residence from Gui County to Nanning, intending to erect a cathedral there. Two French schools were established, one at Nanning, and one at Guilin, by the Little Brothers of Mary. Nuns of St. Paul of Chartres established themselves at Nanning and Longzhou County. During 1908 they relieved 4300 sufferers at their dispensary in Nanning and 4000 at that of Longzhou County.

The following figures give the condition of the mission at the various periods named:

- In 1889
  - 1 bishop,
  - 11 missionaries,
  - 1 seminary,
  - 21 schools with 211 pupils,
  - 16 churches and chapels,
  - 1249 Catholics.
- In 1900,
  - 1 bishop,
  - 17 missionaries,
  - 1 seminary with 16 students,
  - 24 schools with 310 scholars,
  - 32 churches and chapels,
  - 110 baptisms of native adults and 61 baptisms of native children,
  - 1536 Catholics.
- In 1908,
  - 1 bishop,
  - 27 missionaries,
  - 4 native priests,
  - 2 seminaries with 16 students,
  - 34 schools with 379 pupils,
  - 311 baptisms of adults, and 113 baptisms of native children,
  - 4214 Catholics.

== See also ==
- Roman Catholicism in China
