= Little Brothers of the Good Shepherd =

Roman Catholic institute

The Congregation of the Little Brothers of the Good Shepherd, (LBGS) is a Roman Catholic pontifical institute of religious Brothers whose members work in a variety of social service and health care related ministries to the poor and needy throughout the United States, Canada, England, Ireland and Haiti.

== History ==
Maurice Patrick Barrett, later known as Mathias Barrett, was born in Waterford, Ireland on March 15, 1900. At age sixteen, he joined Brothers Hospitallers of St. John of God. After a novitiate in Lyon, France, he professed vows on November 21, 1921. He was sent to Montreal, Quebec, and in 1934 appointed provincial superior of the newly established province of the Brothers Hospitallers. He arrived in California in 1941. He left the Brothers Hospitallers in 1950 and travelled to Albuquerque, New Mexico. The Institute was founded in 1951 in Albuquerque, New Mexico by Brother Mathias Barrett at the behest of Edwin V. Byrne.

== Mission statement ==
"With faith and trust in God's providence, we pledge ourselves to strive always to: proclaim the good news of Jesus Christ, clothe the naked, house the homeless, feed the hungry, comfort the lonely, and promote human dignity."

== Motto ==
The motto of the Little Brothers of the Good Shepherd is "Charity Unlimited". In 2015 this order fused with the Order of St John of God.

== Locations of the order ==
=== United States ===
- New Mexico
- Los Angeles, California
- Miami, Florida
- Momence, Illinois

=== Canada ===
- Hamilton, Ontario
- Toronto, Ontario

=== England ===
- Wolverhampton

=== Ireland ===
- Ballina, Co. Mayo
