= Joseph Tan Yanquan =

- Metropolitan Archbishop of the Roman Catholic Archdiocese of Nanning
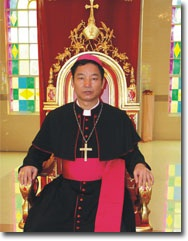
- Church: Cathedral of Our Lady of China
- Archdiocese: Roman Catholic Archdiocese of Nanning
- Province: Guangxi
- Installed: 2007
- Predecessor: Joseph Meng Ziwen

Orders
- Ordination: 1989

Personal details
- Born: 1962 (age 63–64) China
- Denomination: Roman Catholic
- Motto: AD GENTES
- Coat of arms

Chinese name
- Traditional Chinese: 譚燕全
- Simplified Chinese: 谭燕全
Transcriptions
Standard Mandarin
- Hanyu Pinyin: Tán Yànquán

Joseph Tan Yanquan (Chinese: 谭燕全; born 1962) is a Chinese Catholic priest and Metropolitan Archbishop of the Roman Catholic Archdiocese of Nanning since 2007.

== Biography ==
He was ordained a priest in 1989. He was appointed Assistant Archbishop of the Roman Catholic Archdiocese of Nanning in 2003. He was elected Metropolitan Archbishop of the Roman Catholic Archdiocese of Nanning in 2007.

Catholic Church titles
Previous: Joseph Meng Ziwen	Metropolitan Archbishop of the Roman Catholic Archdiocese of Nanning; 2007	Incumbent
