= Mathias Barrett =

Irish monk

- Brother Mathias Barrett (1900-1990)
- Born: Maurice Patrick Barrett; March 15, 1900; Waterford, Ireland
- Died: 1990 (aged 89–90)
- Known for: Founder of The Little Brothers of the Good Shepherd

Brother Mathias Barrett (March 15, 1900 – 1990) was a Catholic Brother born in Ireland who founded a number of homes to help serve the needy and homeless throughout North America. He is also the founder of The Little Brothers of the Good Shepherd.

== Early life ==
Brother Mathias Barrett was born Maurice Patrick Barrett on March 15, 1900 in Waterford, Ireland. On March 17, 1916 Brother Mathias entered the Hospitaller Order of St. John of God. Brother Mathias became a leading force not only as the North American Provincial of his Order, but in building many institutions such as hospitals, soup kitchens, and rehabilitation centers.

== Life work ==
Brother Mathias came to New Mexico in September 1950 after retiring from the St John of God order to help Father Gerald Fitzgerald with the care of priests at Via Coeli. Archbishop Edwin V. Byrne had other plans for him, however and on January 19, 1951 Brother Mathias went to Albuquerque, New Mexico to establish a new Order of Brothers and a house for men on the road.

On January 19, 1951 Brother Mathias founded the Congregation of the Little Brothers of the Good Shepherd (BGS), a Roman Catholic pontifical institute of religious Brothers, whose members profess the canonical, public vows of chastity, poverty and obedience.

Established in Albuquerque and led by Brother Mathias, the Good Shepherd Refuge, now Good Shepherd Center, opened its doors to the homeless and poverty stricken. Adhering to the motto "Charity Unlimited", the Brothers of the Good Shepherd expanded outside of the Albuquerque region and traveled to Columbus, Ohio, where St. Martin's Home opened in 1954. Ozanam Inn, New Orleans, Louisiana, followed in 1955.

By their tenth anniversary, the Brothers' congregation had grown from seven men and one house to 25 men and six houses. Numerous houses were established in the 60's, among them Camillus House in Florida, Good Shepherd Refuge and Center in Canada, St. John's Hospice in Philadelphia, Good Shepherd Manors in Wakefield and Kansas City, and Mount Aloysius in New Lexington, Ohio. Brother Mathias acted as Superior General until the First General Chapter in 1977 and afterwards he continued to work with the poor at Good Shepard facilities.

== Death ==
Brother Mathias Barrett died in 1990 at the age of 90.
