= Martín de Arvide =

Martín de Arvide was a Franciscan missionary to New Spain. He served at and founded several missions in the area of present-day New Mexico, before his death at the hands of a group of Zuni.

== Biography ==
Arvide was born in Puerto de San Sebastian, Cantabria, Spain. He took his vows in the Franciscan order on June 2, 1612, in the Convent of San Francisco. Surviving sources describe him as "a little friar, who was very short."

Arvide was assigned to present-day New Mexico, where he founded Mission San Lorenzo de Picurís. During his tenure there, he baptized more than 200 of the native Picurís people, as well as overseeing the construction of a church. Alonso de Benavides gave the following account of a 1621 incident involving Arvide:

Among the newly converted there was a young man, a son of one of the principal sorcerers. On a certain occasion, the latter undertook to pervert his son and dissuade him from what the father taught. When the friar was informed of it, he left the convent with a crucifix in his hands and, filled with apostolic spirit, he went to the place where the infernal minister was perverting that soul and began to remonstrate with him saying, "It is not sufficient that you yourself want to go to hell without desiring to take your son also?" Addressing the young man, he said, "Son, I am more your father and I love you more than he, for he wants to take you with him to the suffering of hell, while I wish you to enjoy the blessings of being Christian." With divine zeal, he advanced these and other arguments. The old sorcerer arose, grasped a large club nearby, and struck the blessed father such a blow on the head that he felled him, and then he and the others dragged him around the plaza and ill-treated him cruelly.

Subsequently, Arvide requested a reassignment to Mission San José de los Jémez, where the natives had fled from the mission into the Sierra Mountains, and received approval from his superior, Benavides, and the governor, Felipe Zotylo. Arvide remained at San José de los Jémez from 1622 until 1627; Franciscan missionary Barnabas Meyer describes him as "loved" by the natives there. During this period, he also founded the nearby Mission San Diego de la Congregacion.

Benavides then sent Arvide to preach to the Navajo. Arvide reported that the Navajo had received supernatural visitations from Luisa de la Ascensión, a Spanish nun and mystic, and were eager to be baptized.

In 1632 or 1630 (sources differ), Benavides again reassigned Arvide, this time to the Zipias, a tribe near the Little Colorado River. Arvide set out accordingly, accompanied by two soldiers, five natives, and Lorenzo, a mestizo. On the way, he stopped at the Mission La Purisima Concepcíón de Hawikuh, where Francisco de Letrado was stationed. Letrado, hoping for a reassignment, asked Arvide to appeal to Benavides for him; Arvide declined, supposedly saying, "Brother, if you have to be a martyr, it will be here where you are tied by obedience; and if I also am destined to martyrdom, I will meet that fate on my road."

Arvide continued on his journey, but a few days later, on February 27, a group of Zuni attacked his camp by night. Assisted by Lorenzo, they killed the soldiers, cut off Arvide's right hand, and scalped him, before finally killing him. Lorenzo was later executed by the Spanish authorities for his role in the murder.

Between 1917 and 1923, the Hendricks-Hodge Expedition removed the skeletal remains of forty burials from the ruins of the church at the Hawikuh mission. Based on the placement and physical characteristics of one of the skeletons, archaeologist Jesse L. Nusbaum speculated that it might be that of Arvide.
