= Regina Purtell =

United States Army nurse (1866–1950)

Sister Regina Purtell D. C.
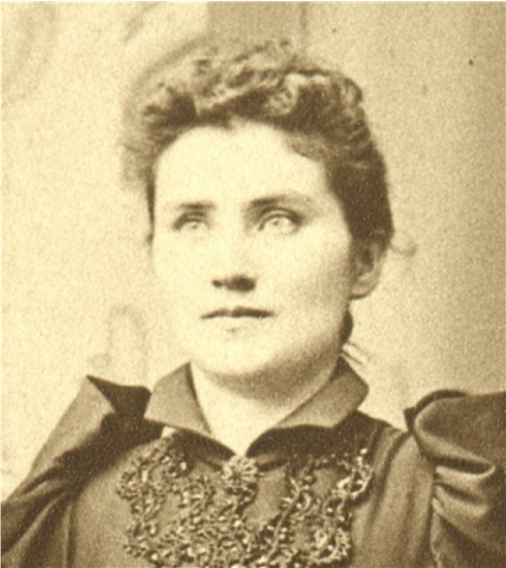

Personal life
- Born: Ellen Purtell; November 14, 1866 Monches, Wisconsin, U.S.
- Died: October 24, 1950 (aged 83) New Orleans, Louisiana, U.S.
- Occupation: Army nurse with Theodore Roosevelt's "Rough Riders"; personal nurse to Roosevelt

Religious life
- Religion: Catholic

Regina Purtell (1866–1950) was an American Roman Catholic sister and United States Army nurse. She cared for Theodore Roosevelt's "Rough Riders", and the media dubbed her "The Florence Nightingale of the Spanish-American War."

In 1902, after Roosevelt had become president, she became his personal nurse at his request when he underwent surgery. In 1918 she became even more well-known for nursing many students at the University of Texas at Austin, including sons of the Rough Riders, during the Spanish flu pandemic.

Her last, 20-year posting at a leprosy hospital in Carville, Louisiana, drew upon all she had learned. Because of her expertise in infectious disease, she was the first to recognize smallpox, and she went into quarantine with her patients. Neither she nor her nurses contracted either smallpox or leprosy thanks to her standard of hygiene and medical care.

== Youth and entry into religious life ==
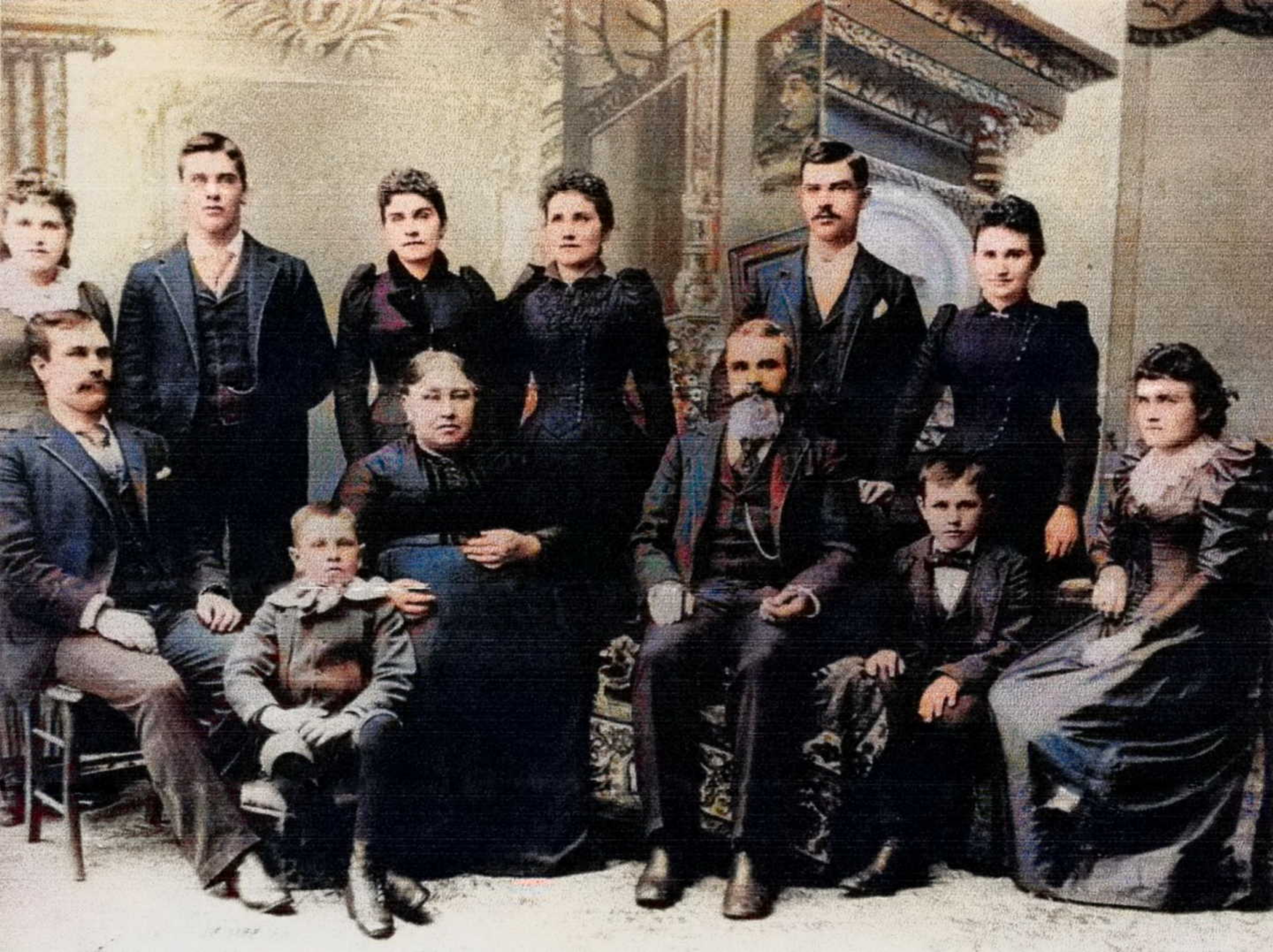
Sister Regina is in the back row, center right. Her parents are seated in the middle of the front row. Photo courtesy of the Purtell family.

Ellen "Nellie" Purtell was born on November 14, 1866, in Monches, Wisconsin, a small village in Waukesha County. Her mother was Catherine Sullivan Purtell, born in Boston, Massachusetts, and her father was John Purtell, born in Bradford, Ontario, Canada. She had three sisters and four brothers. All of the brothers became medical professionals (two doctors and two dentists). Four nephews also became doctors.

She attended a school run by the Daughters of Charity of St. Vincent de Paul, and she became a nursing sister at age 18, in 1883, adding the letters D.C. after her religious name, Mary Regina Purtell (though she always went by Regina).

== Becoming an Army nurse ==
Purtell worked at St. Mary's Hospital in Evansville, Indiana, at the start of the Spanish-American War. Toward the end of the war, President William McKinley issued a call for nurses to minister to soldiers who were suffering in unsanitary conditions at the Camp Wikoff Army Hospital, Montauk Point, Long Island. The Daughters of Charity were among the first volunteers. Sister Purtell applied and was assigned to the 1st United States Volunteer Cavalry, nicknamed the Rough Riders, treating men who had been sent there from Cuba. She found the conditions so unacceptable that she took over and reorganized the entire hospital. She addressed the crisis during a typhoid fever epidemic both there and in Huntsville, Alabama, which is how she met Theodore Roosevelt, saying, "Teddy made the rounds of the sick every day. He had a deep concern for his men."

According to historian Kathleen Smyth, she was "a heroine," but also something of an imposing figure due to her large stature and firm manner, and anecdotes about her flourished. One story says that she demanded better food for the Rough Riders, and a captain argued with her. When she wouldn't listen, he said "I am a captain!" to which she replied, "And every one of those sick boys is a GENERAL to me, sir, and I'll treat them like that." One of her former patients recalled, "My only pleasant memory of my various infirmary sojourns is of the nurses.... Sister Regina resisted the usual routine of rotation from department to department. She admittedly disliked nursing women, so she was a fixture in the men's infirmary. During my first hospitalization, she was night nurse and frequently sat down with me to try to buck up my drooping spirits. She even gave me an alcohol rub — an eyebrow-raising act for a Sister of Charity — and she did it with considerable authority." There are fond stories of her not just caring for her male patients, but even washing their clothes and scrubbing their rooms herself. She became known, especially in the media, as the Florence Nightingale of the Spanish-American War.

== After the Spanish-American War ==
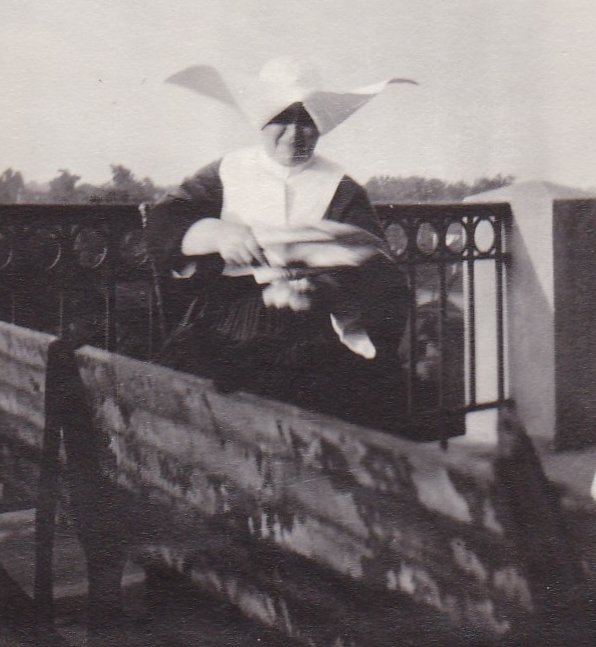
Sister Purtell wearing the famous cornette of the sisters and nurses. Photo courtesy of the Daughters of Charity archives.

At the end of the war, and decorated for her service, she returned to St. Mary's Hospital in Evansville, Indiana. Local businesspeople would call her to find out what she needed by way of supplies, and send them over. She once cared for a member of John Philip Sousa's band, known for its military marches, and afterward Sousa sent the entire group to serenade her in person.

In 1898, she moved to St. Vincent's Hospital in Indianapolis. She preferred to work with male patients, and was assigned to a men's ward. On September 23, 1902, when new-president Theodore Roosevelt had to undergo an extremely painful leg operation at St. Vincent's, he asked her to personally care for him.

In 1918 the sisters assigned her to the University of Texas at Austin, to manage a campus outbreak of the global pandemic of Spanish flu. Her sisters said she acted like a commanding officer, with requests such as "Give me a house, and let me organize it myself." She converted a large fraternity house into "Sister Regina's Hospital" for ill students. She also worked at Seton Hall Hospital of the Daughters of Charity in Austin (today part of the Seton Healthcare Family). She nursed many sons of the original Rough Riders at their garrison in Austin. Teddy Roosevelt visited, and regularly got news of those sons via Purtell. She was quoted by a sister as referring to them as "Just my boys, my sick boys." Each time a young man died she would personally write a letter to his parents, and many of those families remained in contact with her.

In 1919, over the objections of the doctors where she served in Indiana who did not want to lose her, she went to Carville, Louisiana to care for patients with leprosy (Hansen's disease). She worked at United States Marine Hospital #66 on an island in the Mississippi River that became the National Leprosarium, under the auspices of the Public Health Service. The buildings were former quarters of the enslaved. One of the stories about her said that she climbed into a boat on the Mississippi River to row herself all alone from New Orleans to the island. She apparently laughed along with the good-natured comments about those on shore seeing her ample body handling that small boat. Another story said that a man served as her personal guard, and she also had a big watchdog named Zep, a companion who also protected her from patients who could become violent because of their illnesses. Carville was her last major posting, and she stayed almost 20 years, until 1940. Beyond nursing, her sisters noted that "she sewed for the patients, wrote their letters, [and] baked dainties for them." Not all of her patients were American. A Turkish patient spoke no English, but called her "Big Mama" and became quite devoted. Once a Chinese patient brought her seven guns that he wanted her to hide for him until his room was inspected (she was afraid and refused, although she later told the story with humor).

Some reminiscences of her survive in the University of Louisiana at Lafayette archives. In the words of a family member working with the archives, "One of her patients shared with his family the care Sr. Regina showed to him. Norbert Landry (aka James J.J. Jackson) wrote of Sr. Regina, 'She certainly is good to me. Look as if she takes me for her pet. She gives me anything that she can.' He noted also, 'She fixed a pants and some shirts for me the other day.' When his fiancée, Louise, ended their relationship it was Sr. Regina’s support that helped him. He assured his mother that there was no need to worry for, 'Sr. Regina knows all about my trouble with her.' She also apparently gave Norbert. a rosary to replace the one given to him by Louise."

She became a national heroine during an outbreak of smallpox at the leper colony. She was the first to recognize the disease, and went into quarantine with her patients. Her standards were so effective that neither she nor any other sister contracted leprosy or smallpox. Many believed that one would have to die with people with leprosy, smallpox, or both, because of the brutal symptoms, or at least never come back again. She was, however, discharged from those duties when she no longer had the strength, and in 1934, at the age of 68, retired to the Providence Infirmary in Mobile, Alabama. Her correspondence is preserved in the archives of the International Leprosy Association.

== Later years, death, and legacy ==
Ill health forced her into retirement in 1940. She suffered from cataracts that rendered her nearly blind until surgery successfully corrected them. She spent much of that time writing letters to fundraise for foreign missions in India, Japan, China, and elsewhere. She initially lived in a retirement wing of the Providence Infirmary. However, it was demolished, so the sisters transferred her to the DePaul Sanitarium in New Orleans, Louisiana, a Daughters of Charity mental health facility that today is Ascension DePaul Services. It might have seemed like a step down in life, but she spoke of it positively, saying "That will be a little nearer to Carville." In 1945 she broke her arm and hip in a fall, and spent her last five years in a wheelchair.

She died on October 24, 1950, at the age of 83 (several newspaper accounts mistakenly said 84). She is buried in Saint Vincent de Paul Cemetery #1 in New Orleans. The army gave her a full military funeral, the first a nun in Louisiana ever had. A Catholic News Service report stated, "At the cemetery, taps were sounded by an Army bugler and by a bugler-veteran of the Spanish American War. A [medical corps] detail from Camp Leroy Johnson fired a volley, while an Army Medical Corps detail and a number of Army and Navy nurses stood at attention. Spanish-American War veterans were pallbearers."

In 1957 the U. S. Department of Health, Education, and Welfare presented the Daughters of Charity at Carville with its highest honor, the Distinguished Service award, in great part for Purtell's work during the smallpox outbreak.
