= Gordon Murphy =

Gordon Edward Murphy
- Born: January 24, 1918; Chicago, Illinois, United States
- Died: September 28, 1972; Patna, India
- Occupation: Educationist
- Congregations served: Society of Jesus
- Title: Father

Fr. Gordon Edward Murphy SJ was an American Jesuit priest, missionary in India.

== Biography ==
Fr. Murphy was born in Chicago on January 24, 1918 to Joseph and Ella Murphy. His family was of Irish descent. His younger brother Robert J Murphy SJ was also a Jesuit priest and Associate Pastor of Cathedral of Christ the King in Lexington, KY, USA.

Fr. Murphy entered the Society of Jesus on September 1, 1939. He came to India in 1947 with five other fellow Jesuits. He initially worked in Chuhari and Mokamah in Bihar. He went to Pune in 1948 and then Kurseong to study theology. After ordination and final year of theology, he completed his tertianship in Hazaribagh, Bihar (now in Jharkhand) and was later assigned to St. Xavier's High School, Patna as vice-principal. After Fr. Niesen moved to Nepal, Fr. Murphy became the principal of St. Xavier's High School, Patna, which was a school of about six hundred students at the time. Fr. Murphy had exceptional talent in organization and in dealing with people. He had a remarkable memory that became legendary at St. Xavier's and in Patna. Under his administration St. Xavier's High School, Patna grew both in size and in reputation. Fr. Murphy became a byword for Christian education throughout the state of Bihar and beyond. He established himself as a valued consultant in Jesuit education and was also frequently consulted by government organisations.

Fr. Murphy had keen interest in dramatics. He worked with students on many productions at St. Xavier's, including dramatisation of Caine Mutiny Court Martial. In spite of a very busy work schedule, Fr. Murphy regularly joined the students of St. Xavier's on their annual school tours.

In 1968, St Michael's High School, which was run by the Irish Christian Brothers for past 74 years, came under Jesuit administration. St. Michael's was to be staffed by Jesuits drawn from St. Xavier's and other Jesuit schools. After being at St. Xavier's for nearly 20 years (most of which as its principal), Fr. Murphy took charge of St. Michael's as its new principal.

Fr. Murphy had a mild heart attack in 1969. In early September 1972, he was hospitalised after being unwell. After being in the hospital for few weeks, Fr. Murphy died on September 28, 1972. His funeral mass drew one of the largest crowd in Patna's history.

== Bibliography ==
- Jim Cox SJ: We Band of Brothers- Volume 1, The Patna Jesuit Society, Patna, 1994.
