= William W. Davies (USMC) =

U.S. Marine Corps Major General

William Wallace Davies
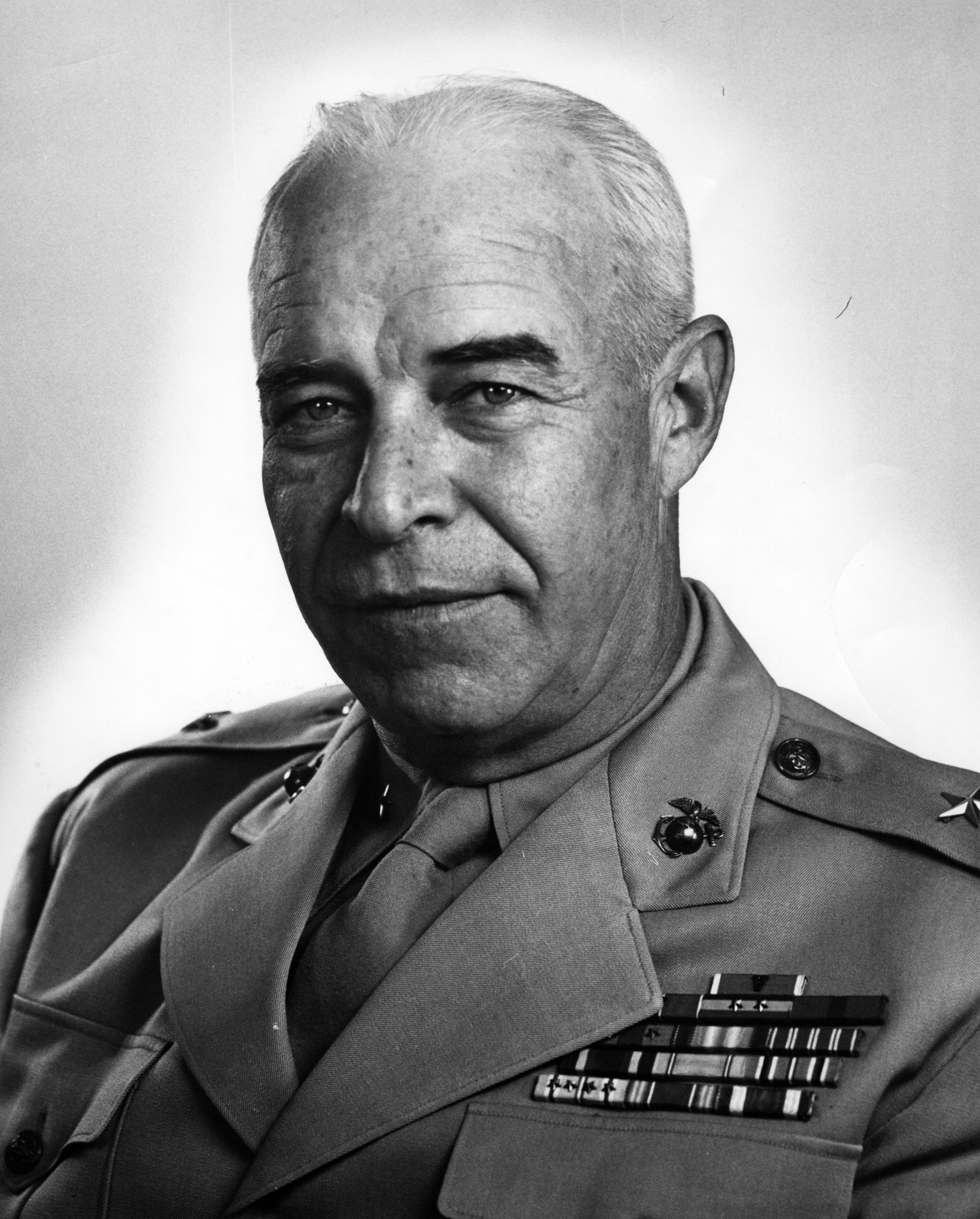
- Davies as brigadier general, USMC
- Born: April 27, 1900; Washington, D.C., U.S.
- Died: June 1, 1985 (aged 85); San Diego, California, U.S.
- Military career
- Allegiance: United States of America
- Branch: United States Marine Corps
- Service years: 1918–1955
- Rank: Major general
- Service number: 0-3780
- Commands: Troop Training Unit, NAB Coronado; Amphibious Tractor Officer, FMFP; 25th Marine Regiment
- Conflicts: World War I Dominican Campaign; Nicaraguan Campaign; Yangtze Patrol; World War II: Battle of Kwajalein; Battle of Saipan; Battle of Tinian; Battle of Okinawa
- Awards: Legion of Merit; Bronze Star Medal

William Wallace Davies (April 27, 1900 – June 1, 1985) was a decorated officer of the United States Marine Corps with the rank of major general. He is most noted as a pioneer in the development of the Marine Corps Landing craft. He later commanded the Troop Training Unit, Naval Amphibious Base Coronado.

== Early career ==
William W. Davies was born on April 27, 1900, in Washington, D.C., and received his high school education at schools in Closter and Englewood, New Jersey. He decided to enlist in the United States Marine Corps in October 1918 and was sent to Marine Barracks at Parris Island for basic training. Davies was subsequently commissioned second lieutenant in the Marine Corps on 4 May 1922 and sent for Officer Basic Course to the Basic School at Marine Barracks Quantico, Virginia.

He remained there until May 1923, when he graduated from the course and was assigned to the 2nd Brigade of Marines. Davies subsequently sailed for Dominican Republic to fight the rebel forces and remained there until August 1924. Davies has returned to the United States and was assigned to the 4th Marine Regiment and participated in the maneuvers in Hawaii. At the beginning of June 1926, he was transferred to the Marine barracks at Puget Sound Navy Yard in Bremerton, Washington, and remained there until April 1927. Davies rejoined 4th Marines in April 1927 and sailed first to Philippine Islands and then to China, to protect the Shanghai International Settlement. He has been transferred to the Marine Barracks on Guam in September 1928 and remained there until October 1929, when he was assigned to the Marine Barracks at Naval Station New Orleans.

Davies served in that capacity until August 1930, when he has been sent to Nicaragua to fight rebel units under Augusto César Sandino. He was assigned to the Guardia Nactional and commanded constabulary detachment until the beginning of 1933. For his service in this capacity, Davies received Nicaraguan Cross of Valor with Diploma by the Government of Nicaragua.

Following his return to the United States in January 1933, Davies has been assigned to the Marine barracks at Washington Navy Yard for a brief period, before he was assigned to the Junior Course at Marine Corps School at Quantico in May 1933. He was transferred to San Diego in June 1936 and subsequently appointed commander of the Marine detachment aboard the battleship USS Oklahoma in September 1936. The ship was assigned to the Pacific Fleet and participated in the patrol duties off the West Coast and on Hawaii.

He finished his sea duties in June 1938, when he was transferred to Washington, D.C., and assigned to Headquarters Marine Corps as Paymaster, Eastern Pay Area. Within this capacity, he served under Brigadier General Russell B. Putnam.

== World War II ==
Davies became first involved in the development of the Marine Corps Landing craft in March 1941, when he was appointed officer in charge of the Amphibian Tractor Training Detachment at Dunedin, Florida. In this capacity he took part in the production and testing of amphibious vehicles throughout the country and established first amphibian tractor school. When the Amphibian Tractor Training Detachment was transferred to Camp Pendleton in July 1943, Davis was appointed commanding officer of the Amphibious Battalion there.

He was promoted to the rank of colonel in early 1944 and assigned as Amphibious Tractor Officer, Fleet Marine Force Pacific under Lieutenant General Holland Smith. Davies took part in the amphibious landing during the Battle of Kwajalein in January 1944 and received his first Navy Presidential Unit Citation.

With the upcoming Battle of Saipan in June 1944, Davies participated in the landing on D-Day and made frequent visits of front lines under enemy fire to collect important information about landing crafts. He also inspected amphibian tractor units and shore parties. During the Battle of Tinian he accomplished the same tasks and subsequently received the Legion of Merit with Combat "V" for his bravery under fire.

Colonel Davies remained in his capacity within Fleet Marine Force, Pacific and participated in the Battle of Okinawa in April 1945. He distinguished himself again and received the Bronze Star Medal with Combat "V" for his merits during the campaign.

== Postwar career ==
Davies returned to the United States with the 25th Marines in October 1945, and the regiment was deactivated on 10 November 1945 at Camp Pendleton. He remained in San Diego and relieved Colonel John Groff as chief of staff of the Marine Corps Base San Diego under Major General Earl C. Long. Davies was subsequently transferred to the staff of the Troop Training Unit, Naval Amphibious Base Coronado and appointed commander of the Mobile Training Unit Nr. 1. In this capacity, he participated in the amphibious training of the recruits for the Pacific Fleet.

When chief of staff of the Troop Training Unit at Coronado, Colonel William S. Fellers, was appointed the commanding general in July 1949, Davies was appointed to his capacity. During September 1950, Davies has been appointed Liaison officer to the Commandant of the Marine Corps, Clifton B. Cates, for Amphibious Tractor Matters.

He was promoted to the rank of brigadier general in January 1952 and returned to Coronado, where he relieved Brigadier General John T. Selden as commanding general of the Troop Training Unit, Naval Amphibious Base Coronado. Davies remained in this capacity only for six months, when he was succeeded by Chesty Puller and personally appointed commander of the Troop Training Team, Amphibious Forces, Far East (TTT) and sent to Japan in June 1952. His mission was to lead TTT instructor force and train newly established Japan Self-Defense Forces.

Brigadier General Davies returned from Japan in May 1954 and was appointed commanding general of Troop Training Unit, Naval Amphibious Base Coronado again. He served in this capacity until his retirement in July 1955. Davies was advanced to the rank of major general on the retired list for having been specially commended in combat.

Following his retirement from the Marine Corps, Davies resided with his family in Ojai, California, and died on June 1, 1985, in San Diego. He had one son and daughter from his marriage.

== Decorations ==
Here is the ribbon bar of Major General William W. Davies:

1st Row	Legion of Merit with Combat "V"		Bronze Star Medal with Combat "V"	
2nd Row	Navy Presidential Unit Citation with two stars	Marine Corps Good Conduct Medal	Marine Corps Expeditionary Medal with two stars	World War I Victory Medal
3rd Row	Second Nicaraguan Campaign Medal	Yangtze Service Medal	American Defense Service Medal	American Campaign Medal
4th Row	Asiatic-Pacific Campaign Medal with four 3/16 inch service stars	World War II Victory Medal	National Defense Service Medal	Nicaraguan Cross of Valor with Diploma
