= Everett Briggs =

Everett Briggs may refer to:

- Everett Ellis Briggs (born 1934), American diplomat
- Everett Francis Briggs (1908–2006), American miners' activist
