= Monongah mining disaster =

1907 coal mine explosion

Monongah Mining disaster
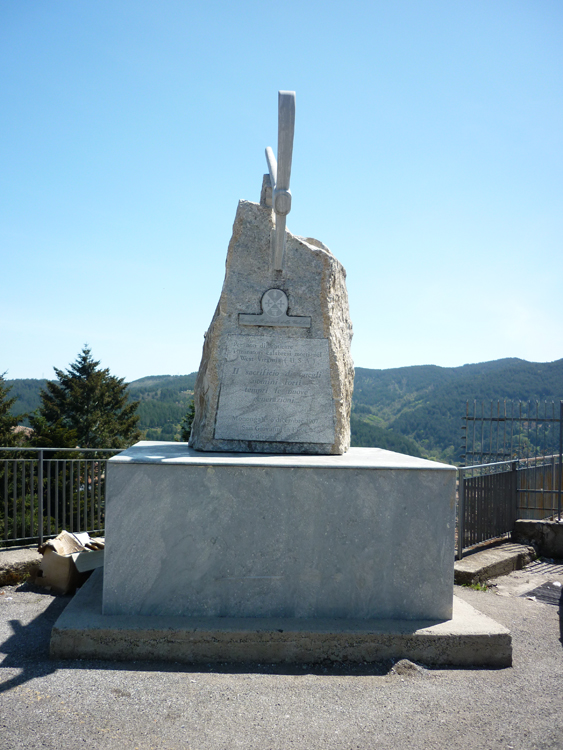
- Date: December 6, 1907
- Location: Monongah, West Virginia, U.S.; 39°27′37″N 80°12′49″W
- Cause: Coal mine disaster
- Deaths: 362

The Monongah mining disaster was a coal mine explosion on December 6, 1907, at Fairmont Coal Company's Nos. 6 and 8 mines in Monongah, West Virginia, which killed 362 miners. It has been described as "the worst mining disaster in American history" and was one of the contributing events that led to the creation of the United States Bureau of Mines.

== The disaster ==
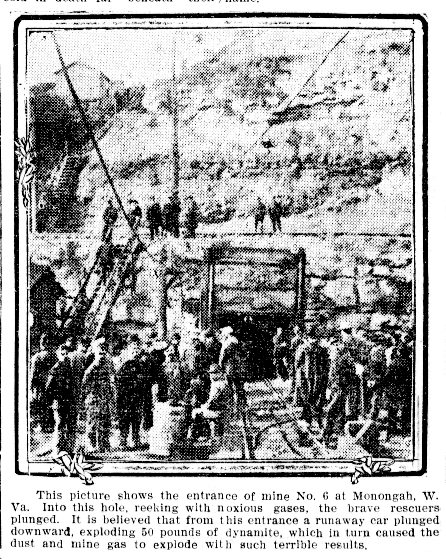
Rescuers going into the mouth of the No. 6 mine, newspaper photo.

On Friday, December 6, 1907, there were officially 420 men in the two mines, although the actual number was much higher as officially registered workers often took their children and other relatives into the mine to help. At 10:28 AM, an explosion occurred in one section of the mine, followed by a larger explosion in another area, instantly killing most of those inside. The blast caused considerable damage to both the mine and the surface. The ventilation systems, necessary to keep fresh air supplied to the mine, were destroyed, along with many railcars and other equipment. The entrance and ventilation fan of No. 8 mine were destroyed, "but did little damage to No. 6 slope."

Inside the mine the timbers supporting the roof were blown down, which caused further problems as the roof collapsed. An official cause of the explosion was not determined, but investigators and representatives from both the Fairmont Coal Company and the Federal Geological Survey put forth theories that an electrical spark or one of the miners' open flame lamps ignited coal dust or methane gas.

== Rescue attempts ==
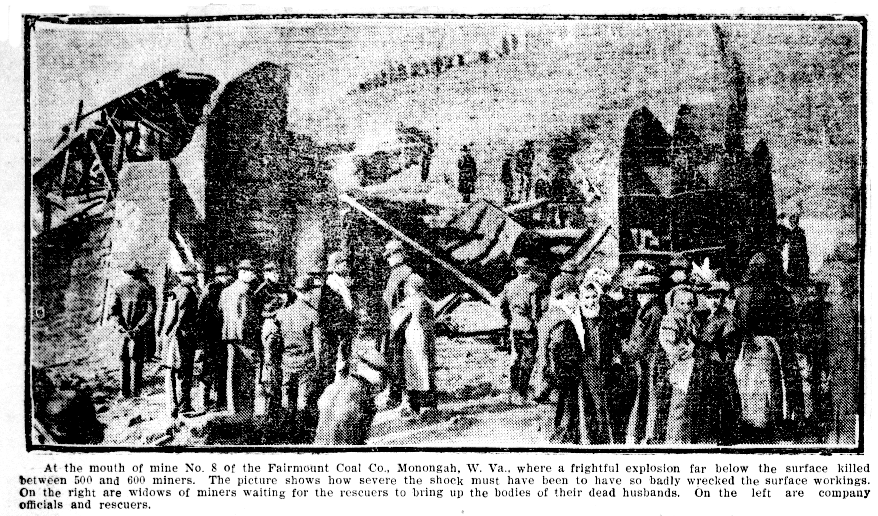
Artistic view of the explosion at the No. 8 mine.

The first volunteer rescuers entered the two mines twenty-five minutes after the initial explosion. The biggest threats to rescuers were the fumes, particularly “blackdamp”, a mix of carbon dioxide and nitrogen that contains no oxygen, and “whitedamp”, which is carbon monoxide. The lack of breathing apparatus at the time made venturing into these areas impossible. Rescuers could only stay in the mine for 15 minutes at a time. In a vain effort to protect themselves, some of the miners tried to cover their faces with jackets or other pieces of cloth. While this might have been able to filter out particulate matter, it would not have been able to protect the miners in an oxygen-free environment.

The toxic fume problems were compounded by the infrastructural damage caused by the initial explosion: mines require large ventilation fans to prevent toxic gas buildup, and the explosion at Monongah had destroyed all of the ventilation equipment in No. 8 mine and disabled the fan in No. 6 mine. Rescuers were eventually able to reconnect No. 6 fan, but the inability to clear the mine of gases further delayed and complicated rescue and recovery efforts.

One Polish miner was rescued, and four Italian miners escaped. The official death toll stood at 362, 171 of them Italian migrants. Others killed in the disaster included Russians, Greeks, and immigrant workers from Austria-Hungary. 216 women were widowed, and the miners left behind 475 children, with a further 31 born after the disaster.

As a result of the explosion along with other disasters, the public began demanding additional oversight to help regulate the mines. In 1910 Congress created the United States Bureau of Mines, with the goal of investigating and inspecting mines to reduce explosions and to limit the waste of human and natural resources. In addition, the Bureau of Mines set up field officers that would train mine crews, provide rescue services, and investigate disasters.

== Memorials ==
In 2003, to commemorate the explosion, the Italian commune of San Giovanni in Fiore, from which many of the miners had emigrated, erected a memorial to those killed in the disaster.

In 2007, the Monongah Heroine, a statue dedicated to the miners' widows, was unveiled. The monument was erected due to the efforts of Father Everett Francis Briggs, a local Catholic priest and historian of the Monongah disaster.

In 2007, to commemorate the 100th anniversary of the explosion, the Italian region of Molise presented a bell to the town of Monongah. Today the bell sits in the Monongah town square.

In 2009, the President of the Italian Republic, Giorgio Napolitano, conferred the Order of Merit for Labour (Italian: Ordine al Merito del Lavoro) upon the victims of the disaster.

== Relief fund ==
After the disaster, the Monongah Mine Relief Committee was established in order to provide aid to those affected by the event. Two subcommittees were set up within this organization: the executive committee, in charge of raising national awareness about the disaster; and the Subscription Committee, in charge of receiving and directing aid to survivors and miners' families.

Others involved in relief efforts included industrialist and philanthropist Andrew Carnegie, whose Hero Fund provided relief to the survivors of those killed during rescue and recovery works. The Red Cross dispatched a special representative, Margaret F. Byington, to assist with gathering information on the survivors in order to coordinate relief efforts.

== Aftermath ==
Although subsequent investigations were unable to uncover the true cause of the explosions, the severity of the disaster provoked a public outcry in favor of stronger safety regulations and public oversight of mines. One notable feature of the Monongah mining complex was that Nos. 6 and 8 mines were connected by a shaft in order to allow both mines to be ventilated from one entrance. This had the effect of placing those in both mines at risk, in the event of an accident. Even after this infrastructural flaw came to light, the Fairmont Coal Company did not disconnect the two mines. Other problems included the use of mechanical and electrical equipment and a failure to adequately water haulways in order to settle dust or to install more adequate dust removal systems.

== See also ==
- Smith Mine disaster
- Argonaut Mine
- Coal mining disasters in United States
- Treadwell Gold Mine
