= Earl C. Long =

U.S. Marine Corps Major General

Earl Cecil Long
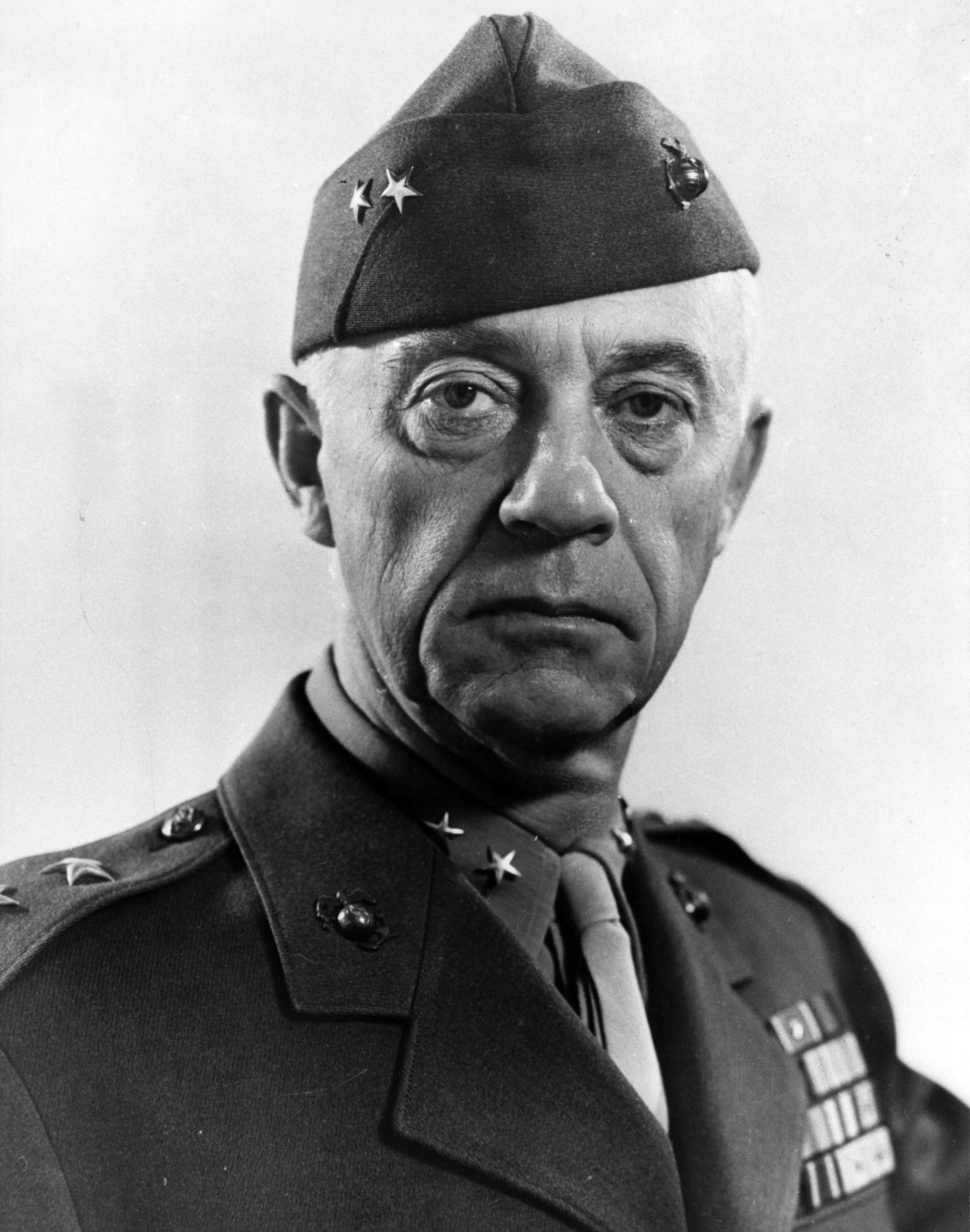
- MG Earl C. Long, USMC
- Born: November 4, 1883; Clayton, New Jersey, U.S.
- Died: August 19, 1983 (aged 99); Menlo Park, California, U.S.
- Military career
- Allegiance: United States
- Branch: United States Marine Corps
- Service years: 1909–1946
- Rank: Major general
- Service number: 0-573
- Commands: Service Command, FMFPAC; MCRD San Diego; Department of the Pacific
- Conflicts: Nicaraguan Campaign; Occupation of Veracruz; World War I Dominican Campaign; Yangtze Patrol; World War II: Solomon Islands campaign; Bougainville Campaign; Marshall Islands campaign
- Awards: Legion of Merit (2)

Earl Cecil Long (November 4, 1883 – August 19, 1983) was a decorated officer in the United States Marine Corps who reached the rank of major general. During World War II, he served as commanding general of Service Command Fleet Marine Force, Pacific and later as commanding general of Marine Corps Recruit Depot San Diego.

== Early life and education ==
Earl C. Long was born on November 4, 1883, in Clayton, New Jersey. Following high school, he enrolled at the University of California, where he graduated in 1905 with Bachelor of Science degree in engineering.

=== U.S. Marine Corps ===
After graduating college, Long worked as s resident engineer in California. He entered the Marine Corps on August 5, 1909, and was commissioned second lieutenant. He was sent to Marine Officers School at Port Royal, South Carolina, for further training in September 1909. Upon graduation in January 1911, Long was assigned to the Marine barracks at Mare Island Naval Shipyard and served there until July 1912. He was subsequently attached to the Marine detachment aboard USS Denver and sailed to Nicaragua to fight rebel troops under General Luis Mena. Long went ashore in Corinto, Nicaragua, and participated in combat operations alongside Major Smedley Butler.

Long continued to serve aboard the USS Denver and participated in operations off the Mexican Coast during the ongoing Occupation of Veracruz in Mexico. He returned stateside in December 1914 and after one month Christmas leave and was assigned to the newly created 4th Marine Regiment under Colonel Joseph H. Pendleton. His new unit subsequently sailed in expeditionary duty in Dominican Republic in June 1916, following the Coup d'état there led by the nation's Secretary of War Desiderio Arias.

The 4th Marines landed at Monte Cristi, Dominican Republic on June 18, 1916, and fought their way to Santo Domingo. Upon withdrawal of rebel forces to Santiago in July of that year, rebel forces were annihilated or captured. Long was promoted to the rank of first lieutenant in October 1916 and assigned to Marine detachment aboard USS Charleston, which participated in the escort of the convoys carrying the first troops of the American Expeditionary Force to France during World War I.

=== Interwar period ===
While in France, Long was promoted to captain in April 1917 and returned to the U.S. in June 1918. He was subsequently assigned to the Marine Barracks San Diego and served there until January 1920, when he was transferred to the Quartermaster Department at Headquarters Marine Corps. Long was transferred to the Marine Barracks Cavite, Philippines at the beginning of May 1920 and spent the next two years there. In November 1922, he returned to San Diego and, following his promotion to major in January 1924, he was transferred to the Marine Barracks Quantico.

The 3rd Marine Brigade was formed there under Brigadier General Smedley Butler and sailed to China in May 1927, where he participated in the defense of the Shanghai International Settlement. Long received orders for return stateside in January 1929 and was attached again to the Quartermaster Department at Headquarters Marine Corps. He was ordered to the Field Officer's Course at Marine Corps Schools within Marine Barracks Quantico. After graduation, Long was promoted to lieutenant colonel in October 1934.

In November 1934, he was ordered again to the Marine Barracks San Diego and remained there until the end of June 1936, when he was transferred to San Francisco at Headquarters of Department of Pacific. In this capacity, he was promoted to colonel in June 1938.

=== World War II ===
Long was appointed assistant chief of staff for supply of the Department of the Pacific (DoP) under Brigadier General Charles F. B. Price in 1940. In this capacity, he was promoted to the rank of brigadier general in August 1942. He was transferred to the South Pacific Area in May 1943, where was assigned to the staff of the I Marine Amphibious Corps (IMAC) under Major General Clayton Barney Vogel as commanding general of supply service. Long participated in Bougainville Campaign and later was transferred to the same capacity within V Amphibious Corps (VAC) under Major General Holland Smith. For his service with I MAC and VAC, Long was decorated with the Legion of Merit.

When the Service Command Leet Marine Force Pacific (FMFPac) was formed on April 6, 1944, Long was appointed its first commanding general. In this capacity, he was responsible for the supply, salvage, evacuation, construction, personnel management, quartering, and sanitation needs of all FMFPac units and others Marine units in its area. Long was promoted to the major general in November 1944.

Shortly before the End of the War in Pacific, Long was relieved by Brigadier General Merritt A. Edson on June 30, 1945, and returned to the U.S. He was subsequently sent to San Diego area, where he relieved Colonel John Groff, who was temporary commander of Marine Corps Recruit Depot San Diego. For his service with Service Command, FMFPac, Long received his second Legion of Merit.

He served in this capacity until the end of January 1946, when he took over the command of the Department of the Pacific, relieving Major General Julian C. Smith on February 1, 1946. His command administered Marine activities, barracks, and detachments on the West Coast, Hawaii, and outlying Pacific islands, Alaska, and Aleutian Islands.

Long retired from active service on August 1, 1946.

Long resided in Menlo Park, California during retirement. He died on August 19, 1983, at the age of 99 years.

== Decorations ==
Here is the ribbon bar of Major General Earl C. Long:

1st Row	Legion of Merit with one 5/16" Gold Star		Marine Corps Expeditionary Medal	
2nd Row	Nicaraguan Campaign Medal	Mexican Service Medal	World War I Victory Medal with France clasp	Yangtze Service Medal
3rd Row	American Defense Service Medal with Base Clasp	Asiatic-Pacific Campaign Medal with two 3/16 inch service stars	American Campaign Medal	World War II Victory Medal

Military offices
Preceded by Julian C. Smith	Commanding General of the Department of the Pacific; February 1, 1946 - May 17, 1946	Succeeded by Henry L. Larsen
Preceded by John Groff	Commanding General of the MCRD San Diego; July 13, 1945 - January 23, 1946	Succeeded by Miles R. Thacher
