= Ruth Broe =

- Born: December 10, 1911; Monongah, West Virginia, U.S.
- Died: August 19, 1983 (aged 71)
- Burial place: Riverside National Cemetery
- Military career
- Allegiance: United States of America
- Branch: United States Marine Corps
- Service years: 1943–1971
- Rank: Colonel
- Commands: United States Marine Corps Women's Reserve

Ruth Broe (10 December 1911 - 19 August 1983) was one of the first women to join the United States Marine Corps and one of the first three women to attain the rank of Colonel in the Marines.

In 2013, Broe was awarded The Colonel Julia E. Hamblet Award (for furthering the recognition of the history of women Marines) by the Marine Corps Heritage Foundation.

== Life and military career ==
Born Ruth Hammond on 10 December 1911 in Monongah, West Virginia, she joined the Marines in 1943 when the Marine Corps first started accepting female recruits. In 1951, she married a Marine, Richard W. Broe in Laguna Beach, California, and they were stationed at El Toro. She served as National President of the Women Marines Association from 1972 to 1974. In 1966, she co-authored History of the Marine Corps Reserve. She retired in 1971.
