= James Amrhein =

American engineer

James Edward Amrhein
- Born: November 5, 1923; Brooklyn, New York
- Died: May 22, 2011 (aged 87); Los Altos, Long Beach, California
- Occupation: civil engineer
- Years active: 1958-2006
- Known for: Executive director of the Masonry Institute of America
- Notable work: Reinforced Masonry Engineering Handbook

James E. Amrhein was an American civil engineer and structural engineer who served as the executive director of the Masonry Institute of America as such he wrote most of the handbooks on masonry engineering, installation, and inspection.

== Biography ==
Structural Engineering is the Art of molding materials we do not wholly understand into shapes we cannot precisely analyze, so as to withstand forces we cannot really assess, in such a way that the community at large has no reason to suspect the extent of our ignorance.

— Attributed to Amrhein

Amrhein was born in Brooklyn, New York on November 5, 1923 to Joseph and Kunigunda Amrhein and graduated from Brooklyn Technical High School before earning his BCE at Manhattan College and his MCE at Columbia University, graduating as a member of Tau Beta Pi and Chi Epsilon.

During World War II Amrhein was a Lieutenant in the Seabees seeing service in Iwo Jima as well as during the occupation of Japan. He would continue to serve through the Korean War, where he worked to construct bases at Cubi Point and Subic Bay in the Philippines.

He was a member of the Structural Engineers Association of Southern California, the SEAOC College of Fellows, was the founder of the Masonry Society, as well as being a fellow of the American Society of Civil Engineers, the American Concrete Institute and the International Code Council while also serving for 6 years on the Long Beach planning and zoning commission. From 1989 to 1990 Amrhein served as the President the Masonry Institute of America having been the executive director for the prior 26 years, as such he served as co-chair for the first North American Masonry Conference.

Amrhein worked as a supervising structural engineer at the Portland Cement Association before joining the Masonry Institute of America, winning the Steven B. Barnes Award for his research on “Tall Slender Wall Performance.” He was also a professor at the California State University at Long Beach from 1961 to 1988.

== Personal life ==
James was married to Laurette Amrhein for 56 years, the couple had 4 children: Christopher, a professor of soil and environmental science at the University of California Riverside, Michele a chemical engineer, Mark a geotechnical engineer, and Bruce a biomedical engineer. He died on May 22, 2011 and is buried in the Riverside National Cemetery.

== Bibliography ==
Amrhein wrote 10 books and 32 technical reports, including:

- Masonry Design Manual. 3rd Edition (January 1979)
- Reinforced masonry engineering handbook: Clay and concrete masonry (January 1983) ISBN 0-940116-05-7
- Marble and Stone Slab Veneer (January 1989) ISBN 0-940116-15-4
- Reinforced Grouted Brick Masonry (January 1991) ISBN 0-940116-19-7
- Masonry Veneer (January 1994) ISBN 0-940116-23-5
- Masonry Codes and Specifications, 1994 (January 1994) ISBN 0-940116-11-1
- Tall slender walls: Estimating curves for area of steel for reinforced masonry (January 1994) ISBN 0-940116-26-X
- Residential Masonry Fireplace and Chimney Handbook (January 1995) ISBN 0-940116-29-4
- Reinforcing steel in masonry: Details, construction, specifications (January 1999) ISBN 0-940116-33-2
- Reinforced Concrete Masonry Construction Inspector's Handbook, 6th Edition (January 2006) ISBN 0-940116-47-2
