= John L. Whitehead Jr. =

African-American United States Air Force officer

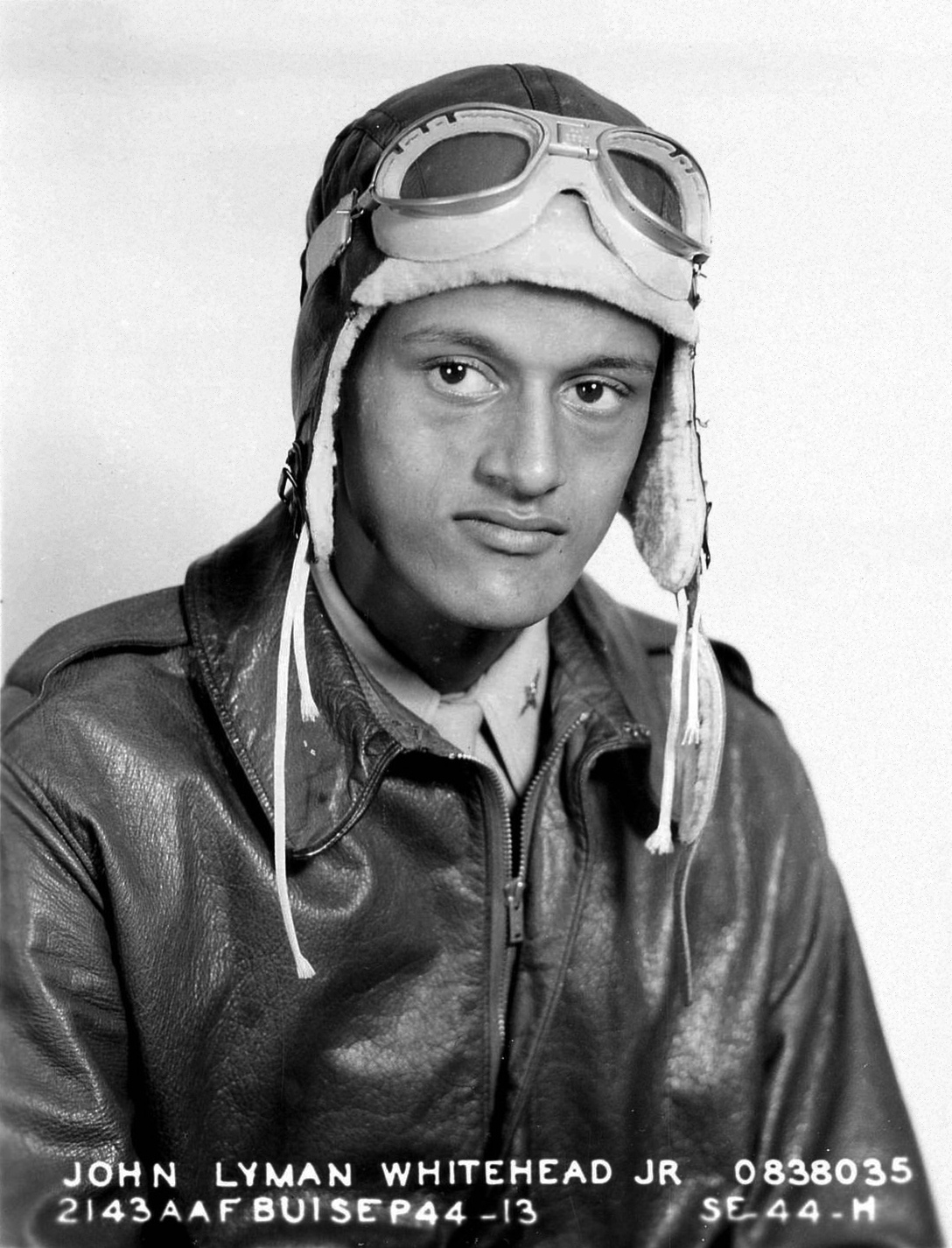
- As a Tuskegee airman in 1944
- Born: 14 May 1924; Lawrenceville, Virginia, U.S.
- Died: 6 September 1992 (aged 68); Sacramento, California, U.S.
- Burial place: Riverside National Cemetery
- Military career
- Allegiance: United States of America
- Branch: United States Air Force
- Service years: 1943–1974
- Rank: Lieutenant Colonel
- Nickname: Mr. Death
- Conflicts: World War II; Korean War; Vietnam War
- Awards: Distinguished Flying Cross (4); Air Medal (8); Army Commendation Medal; Air Force Commendation Medal

John Lyman Whitehead Jr. ("Mr. Death") (May 14, 1924 – September 6, 1992) was an American who served in World War II (as part of the Tuskegee Airmen), the Korean War and the Vietnam War. He was the first African American to graduate from the U.S. Air Force Test Pilot School, one of the first to become a jet pilot instructor, and the first to fly the Boeing B-47 Stratojet bomber.

== World War II ==
John Lyman Whitehead Jr. was born in Lawrenceville, Virginia, on 14 May 1924. His father, John Lyman Whitehead Sr, was a 1916 Yale graduate who served as the Business Manager and Treasurer at the now-defunct Saint Paul's College. In 1942, he found work as a line boy at Charleston Airport. He joined the Enlisted Reserve Corps in 1942, and enlisted in the United States Army Air Corps the following year, when he reached the minimum age of 19 during World War II. He was selected for training as a pilot, and sent to Tuskegee Army Air Field in Alabama, where he became one of the Tuskegee airmen. He earned his wings on 8 September 1944, and was commissioned as a second lieutenant.

Whitehead was assigned to the 301st Fighter Squadron in Italy in March 1945. This was one of four African American fighter squadrons in the 332nd Fighter Group flying the North American P-51 Mustang. He earned the nickname "Mr. Death", not from his flying skills, but from his scrawny 121-pound (55 kg) frame. Nonetheless, he liked the name, and had it painted on his aircraft. He flew 19 combat missions before the war in Europe ended on 8 May 1945. During one mission his squadron was attacked by 33 German fighters, and lost two Mustangs; Whitehead only narrowly avoided being shot down himself. On another mission, German anti-aircraft guns holed his wings and a piece of shrapnel went through his parachute, just inches from his body.

== Later career ==
The 332nd Fighter Group returned to Tuskegee, where it was inactivated on 19 October 1945. African American aviation units were concentrated in the 477th Composite Group, which moved to Lockbourne Army Air Base in Ohio on 13 March 1946. It was inactivated on 1 July 1947, and replaced by the reactivated 332nd Fighter Group. Whitehead briefly left the Air Force in January 1947 to enter West Virginia State College, where he earned a Bachelor of Science degree in 1948. After graduation he returned to duty with the 332nd Fighter Group, but it was disbanded on 1 July 1949, in the wake of President Harry S. Truman's Executive Order 9981 integrating the armed forces.

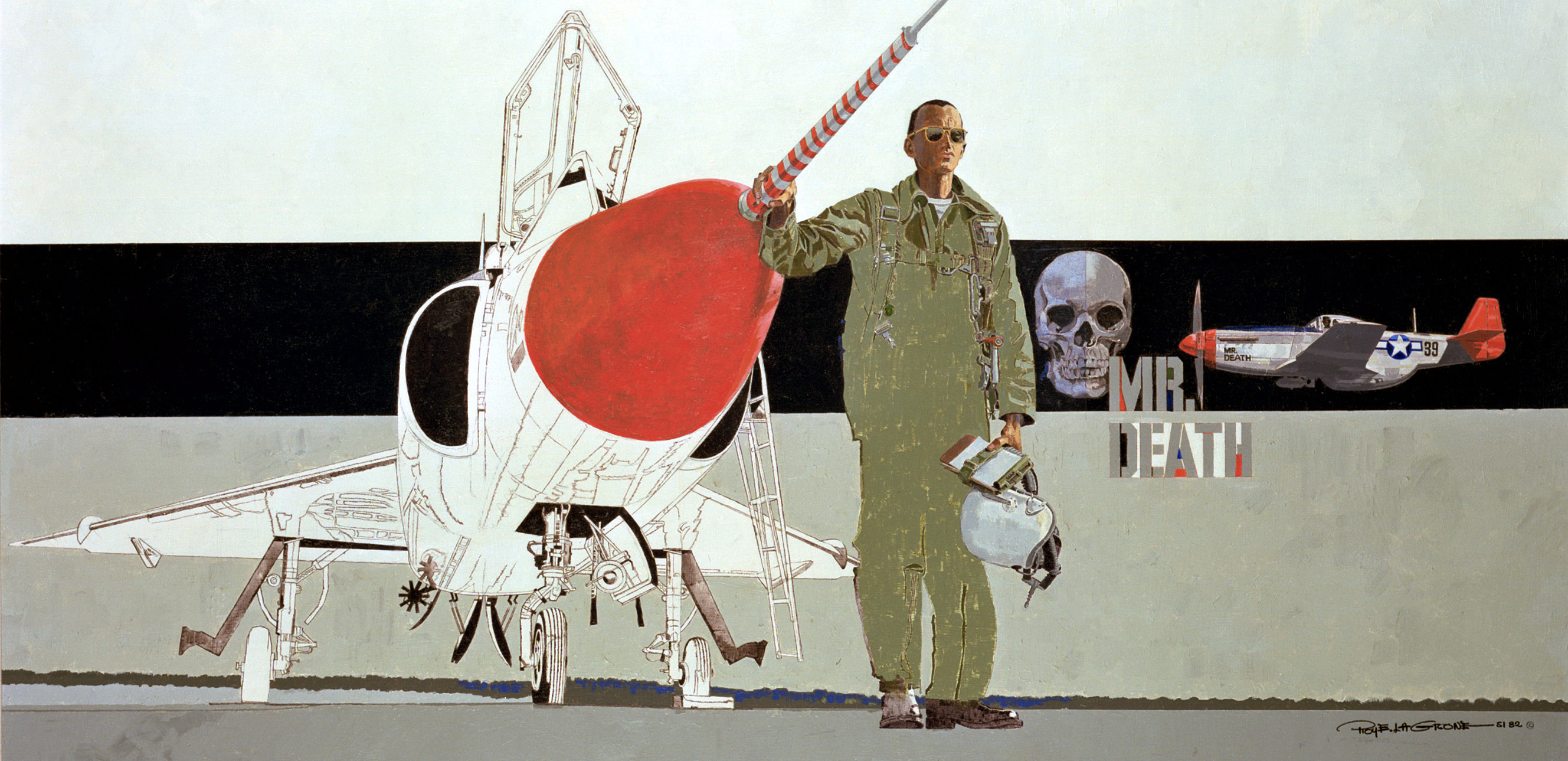
USAF artwork

In June 1949, Whitehead was posted to Williams Air Force Base in Arizona, where he became the first African American jet pilot instructor. There were other African American instructors, but Whitehead was the first to train pilots in jet aircraft. The following year he became the Air Training Command liaison at Boeing for the Boeing B-47 Stratojet, becoming the first African American pilot to fly that bomber. He saw combat again during the Korean War, flying 104 missions. He was then assigned to Northrop Corporation at Hill Air Force Base in Utah as a test pilot. He was part of class 57C at the U.S. Air Force Test Pilot School, and became the first African American to graduate from there on 3 January 1958. In the 1960s he flew combat missions in the Vietnam War, and served at Edwards Air Force Base in California as a squadron and deputy group commander. He retired from the Air Force in 1974. He had flown over 9,500 hours, of which 5,000 was in jets. He never had an accident.

From August 1984 to January 1992, Whitehead served as a California State Park Commissioner. A camping ground at Colonel Allensworth State Historic Park was named in his honor. He died in Sacramento, California, on 6 September 1992, and was buried in Riverside National Cemetery.
