= Stephen E. Burgio =

American judge

Stephen E. Burgio (December 23, 1912 – November 28, 2001) from Queens, New York was a former New York Supreme Court Justice, criminal defense attorney, and assistant to Chief Prosecutor Supreme Court Justice Robert H. Jackson during the Nuremberg Trials.

== Education and career ==
Burgio graduated from St. John's University and St. John's University School of Law. He was a captain in the United States Army during World War II. As Judge Advocate at Camp Reynolds, he presided at over a hundred court martials. He served on the War Crimes Commission, and was involved in the Nuremberg Trials assistant to Chief Prosecutor Supreme Court Justice Robert H. Jackson, on trials concerning Buchenwald and Dachau camp cases.

Burgio started law firm with Lawrence C. Mule after the war. In 1956 he was appointed director of the Republican Party's campaigns in New York's Eighth Assembly District. He served on the New York City Tax Commission from 1966 to 1970.

== Personal life ==
Burgio was married to Angela Burgio. He retired and moved to southern California in 1982, to help run his sons-in-law's winery in Santa Barbara. He died in 2001, at the age of 89. He is buried at the Riverside National Cemetery in Riverside, California.
