= Joe Morris Sr. =

World War II Navajo code talker (1926–2011)

- Born: April 19, 1926; Indian Wells, Arizona, U.S.
- Died: July 17, 2011 (aged 85); Loma Linda, California, U.S.
- Burial place: Riverside National Cemetery
- Military career
- Allegiance: United States
- Awards: Congressional Silver Medal

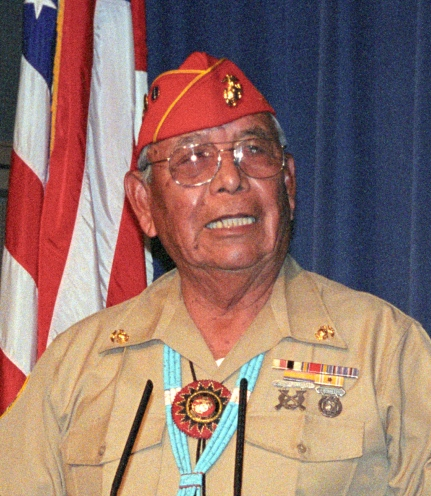
Joe Morris Sr. in 2002

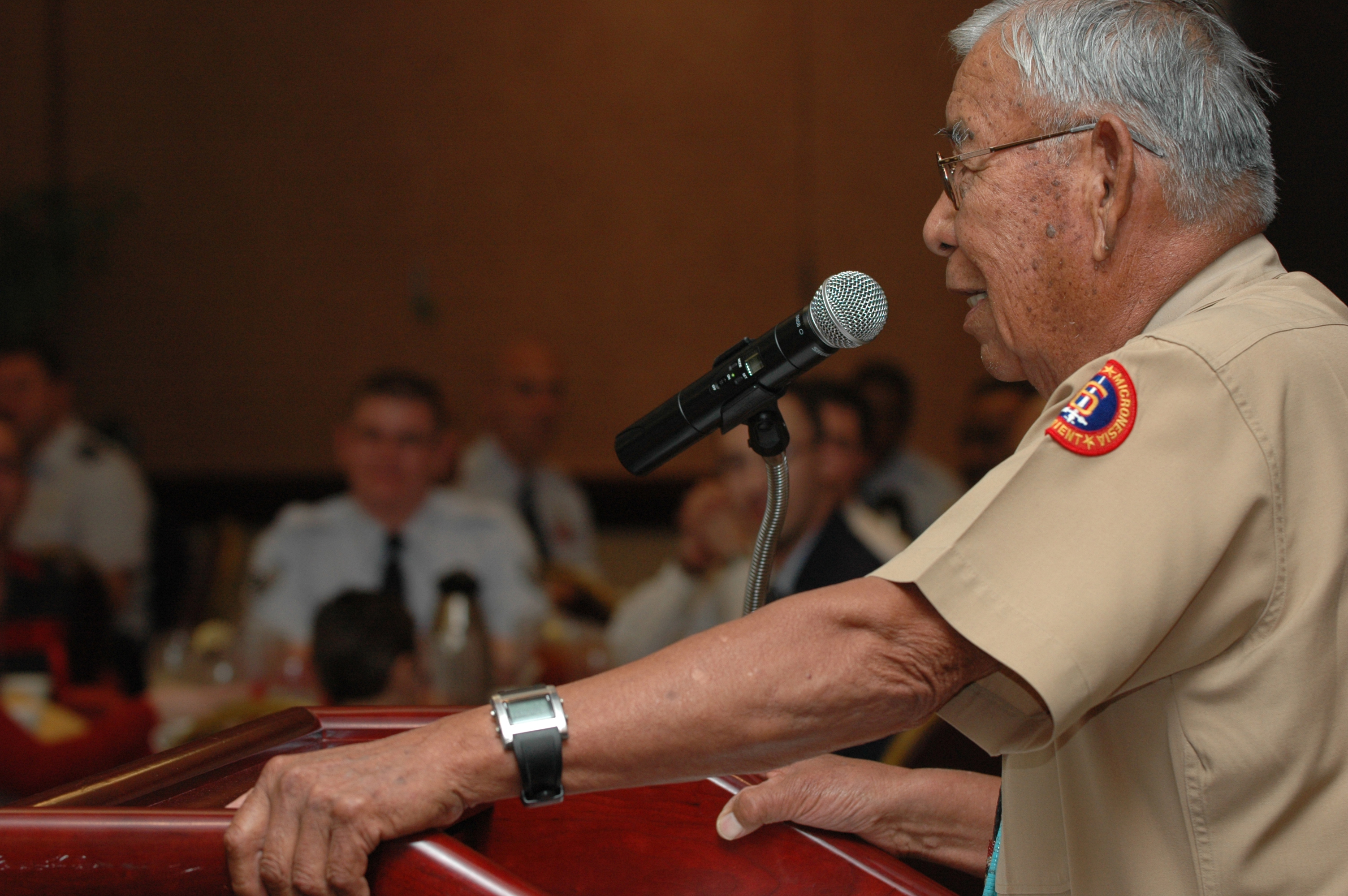
Joe Morris, Sr. in 2008

Joe Morris Sr. (April 19, 1926 – July 17, 2011) was an American World War II United States Marine veteran and Navajo code talker.

Morris was born as one of four children on April 19, 1926, in Indian Wells, a village on the Navajo Nation in northeast Arizona, as a member of the Kin'lichii'nii Clan. He took care of his parents horse, sheep and livestock. According to the Los Angeles Times, Morris described the reservation where he was raised as having "no electricity, no running water, no school." He began attending a government-run boarding school approximately 70 milies from his home when he was twelve years. Morris was taught English at the school. Morris' school was closed at the outbreak of World War II and the building was turned into a Japanese-American internment camp.

Morris told the U.S. draft board in 1943 that he was 18 years old, when he was actually 17 years old, in order to get his draft card. He worked on in an ore mine in Arizona for several months before he was drafted into the United States Marines. In a 1988 interview with the Modesto Bee, Morris said that a Navajo medicine man prayed for him for a day and a half upon his drafting, which Morris credited with surviving the war unharmed.

Morris was sent to Camp Pendleton, where he and approximately 400 other Navajos received communications training to become code talkers. Morris served as a Marine code talker throughout the Pacific Theater, serving with the 2nd Marine Regiment, 6th Marine Division, including Guadalcanal and Guam. He was a participant in the Battle of Okinawa, where the Japanese blocked the Navajo's messages. In 2004, Morris told a Veterans Days observance in San Bernardino, California, that "My weapon was my language...We saved a lot of lives." At the end of World War II, Morris was told by his commanders not to speak of the Navajo code talkers with anyone. That included Morris' parents and wife, whom he did not tell either. Morris began revealing the details of the Navajo code talkers only the code talkers' mission and role in the war was declassified in 1968.

Morris was honorable discharged from the Marines in 1946 and married his wife, Charlotte Morris. He was hired at a Marine supply center in Barstow, California, and settled in the small town of Daggett, a small town in the Mojave Desert. He worked as a maintenance department supervisor at the same supply center until his 1984 retirement.

Joe Morris spoke extensively about the experience of the Navajo code talkers during the 1990s and 2000s (decade). Morris and his fellow Navajo code talkers were honored by in an exhibit at the Pentagon in 1992, which he attended. Morris also attended Congressional Gold Medal ceremony in 2001, in which President George W. Bush presented the award to four or the original twenty-nine Navajo code talkers. He and 200 surviving code talkers were awarded the Congressional Silver Medal on November 25, 2001, at a ceremony in Window Rock, Arizona.

Joe Morris Sr. died from complications of a stroke on July 17, 2011, at Jerry L. Pettis Memorial VA Medical Center in Loma Linda, California, at the age of 85. President of the Navajo Nation Ben Shelly ordered American flags on the Navajo Nation to be lowered to half staff in Morris' honor. He was buried at Riverside National Cemetery in Riverside, California.
