= Augie Blunt =

American actor (1929–1999)

- Blunt in Ghost (1990)
- Born: August 17, 1929; Monroe, Michigan, U.S.
- Died: May 2, 1999 (aged 69); Los Angeles, California, U.S.
- Occupation: Actor
- Years active: 1989–1999

Augie Blunt (August 17, 1929 – May 2, 1999) was an American film and television actor.

Blunt was born Augustine Durell Blunt in Monroe, Michigan, located south of Detroit, Michigan; his parents were William Blunt and Essie C. Wilson-Blunt. He and his parents lived in Monroe. After the military Augie moved to Los Angeles, California where he was a musician and a teacher for LAUSD before deciding to become an actor, and so he did by appearing in films and television shows. His son Erin Blunt was a child actor in Car Wash and Bad News Bears.

Blunt married Dolores Scott on February 2, 1962, in Las Vegas, Nevada, together they had 3 children, (1 son, 2 daughters), Jean Adele Scott- Blunt (b. 1958), Carla Nicole Scott- Blunt (b. 1960), Erin Durell Blunt (b. 1963)

Blunt died on May 2, 1999, in Los Angeles, California. He was 69 years old, and was interred at Riverside National Cemetery.

== Filmography ==
Year	Title	Role	Notes
1989	Princess Warrior	Matt	
1990	Ghost	Orlando	
1992	Steel Justice	Kareem	TV movie
1992	Hell Spa	Roque	
1993	Full House	Saxophone Player	Episode: "Subterranean Graduation Blues"
1995	Cagney & Lacey: Together Again	Yet Another Bum	TV movie
1995	The American President	Groundskeeper	
1999	Life	Man in Prison	
2000	Club Dead	Roque	Video, (final film role)
