= Riverside National Cemetery =

Veterans cemetery in Riverside County, California

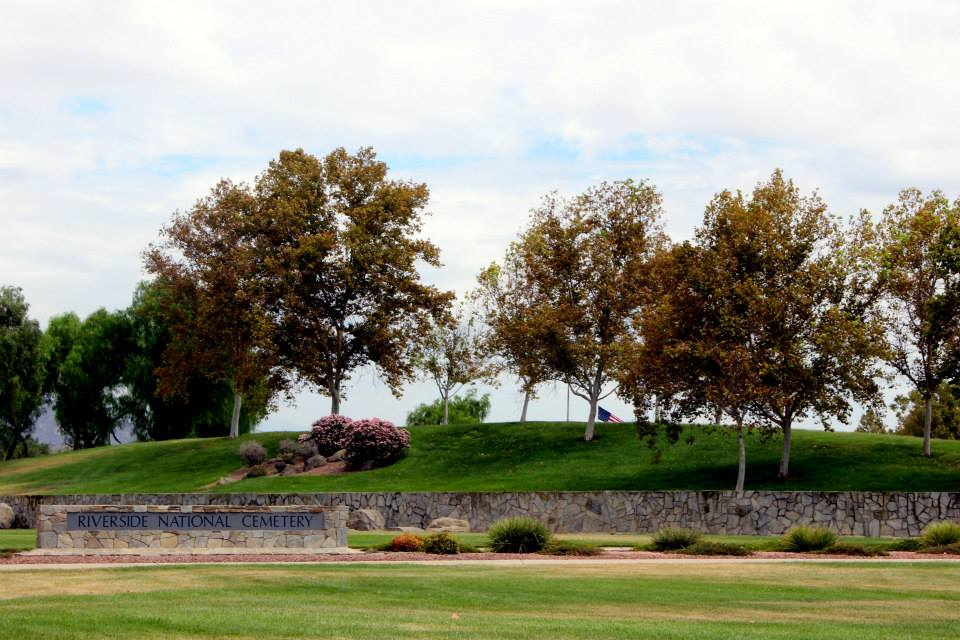
- Riverside National Cemetery Entrance
- Interactive map of Riverside National Cemetery

Details
- Established: 1976
- Location: Riverside, California
- Country: United States
- Coordinates: 33°53′05″N 117°16′34″W
- Type: Public
- Owned by: Department of Veterans Affairs
- Size: 921 acres (373 ha)
- No. of graves: 301,000 (As of July 2022)
- Website: Official Site; Veterans Department Grave Locator
- Find a Grave: Riverside National Cemetery
- The Political Graveyard: Riverside National Cemetery

Riverside National Cemetery is a cemetery located in Riverside, California, dedicated to the interment of United States military personnel. The cemetery covers 921 acres (373 ha). It has been the most active cemetery in the system since 2000, based on the number of interments.

== History ==
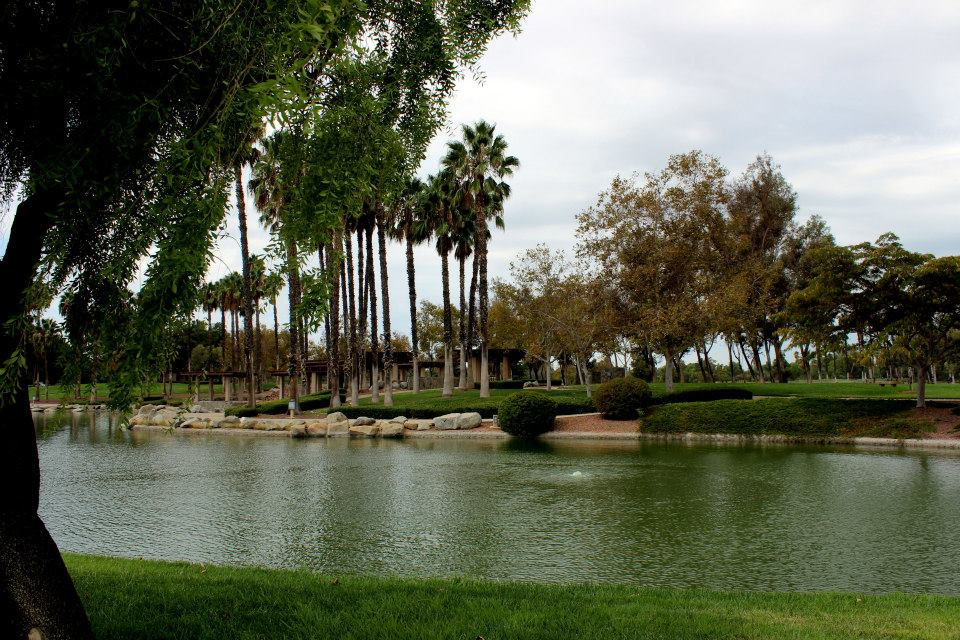
Riverside National Cemetery View

Riverside National Cemetery was established in 1976 through the transfer of 740 acres (300 ha) from March Air Force Base, a section that during World War II was called Camp Haan. The site was selected in 1976 to provide full burial options for Southern California veterans and their families by President Ford’s Commission for National Cemeteries and Monuments. An additional 181 acres (73 ha) was transferred by the U.S. Air Force in 2003.

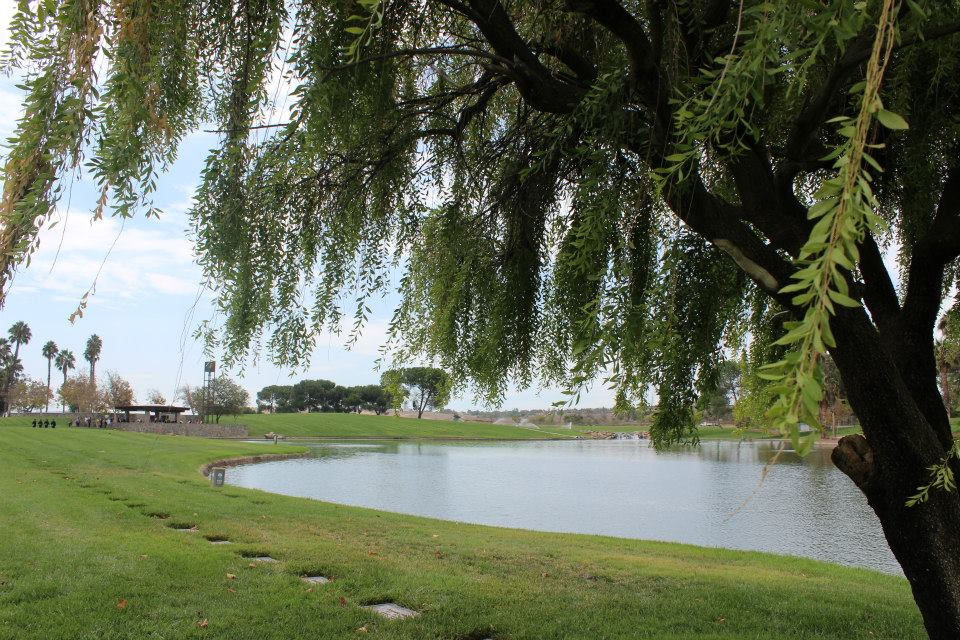
Riverside National Cemetery Graves

With 15 Medal of Honor recipients in attendance and the Marine Corps’ greatest fighter ace Joe Foss as featured speaker, Riverside National Cemetery was dedicated and opened for burials on November 11, 1978. The cemetery's first burial was Army Staff Sergeant Ysmael R. Villegas, who was awarded the Medal of Honor for bravery at the cost of his own life at Villa Verde Trail on the island of Luzon in the Philippines on March 20, 1945. Following the war, Villegas was buried at Olivewood Cemetery in Riverside. Prior to the opening of Riverside National Cemetery, the Veterans Administration asked the Villegas family if he could be honored by re-burial in the new National Cemetery.

The dramatic and meandering landscape features a central boulevard with memorial circles, lakes, indigenous-styled committal shelters, and a memorial amphitheater.

Military funeral honors are provided for eligible veterans by military honor guards from each branch of service, by the California National Guard, and by several volunteer teams collectively known as the Memorial Honor Detail or MHD upon request of family members through their funeral home.

== Monuments and Memorials ==
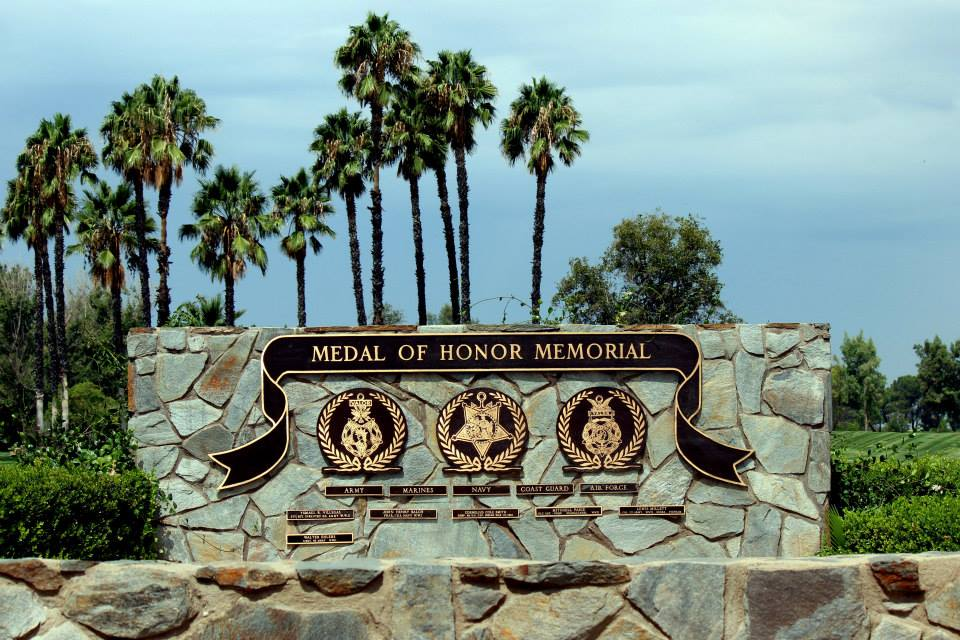
Riverside National Cemetery Medal of Honor Memorial

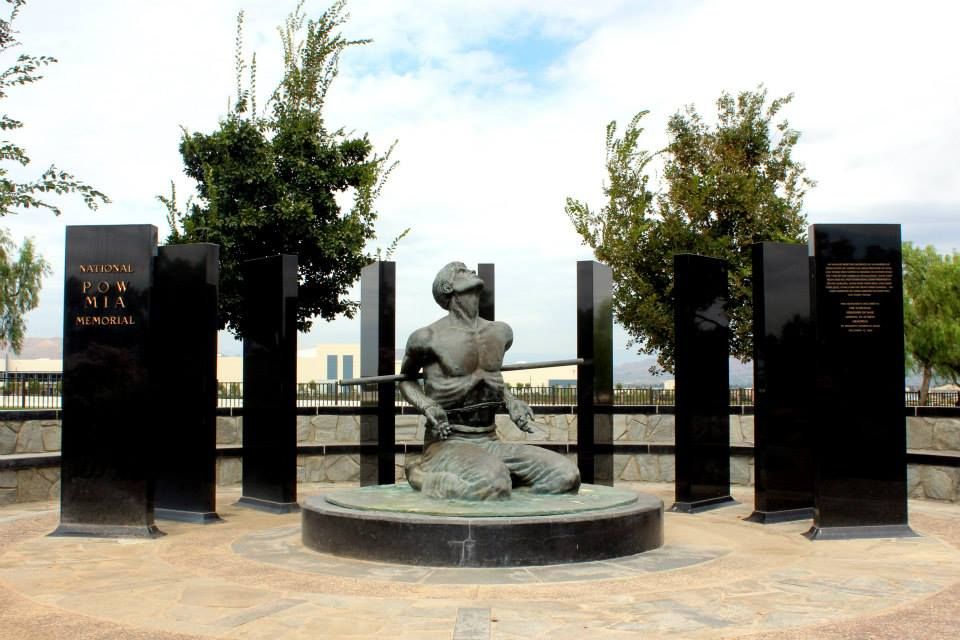
Riverside National Cemetery POW MIA Memorial

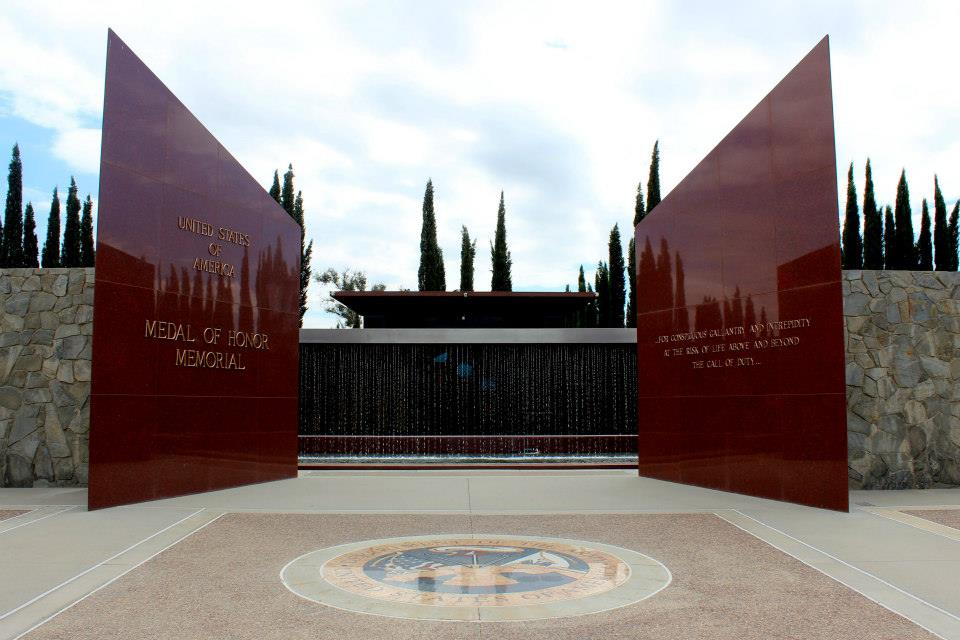
Riverside National Cemetery Medal of Honor Memorial

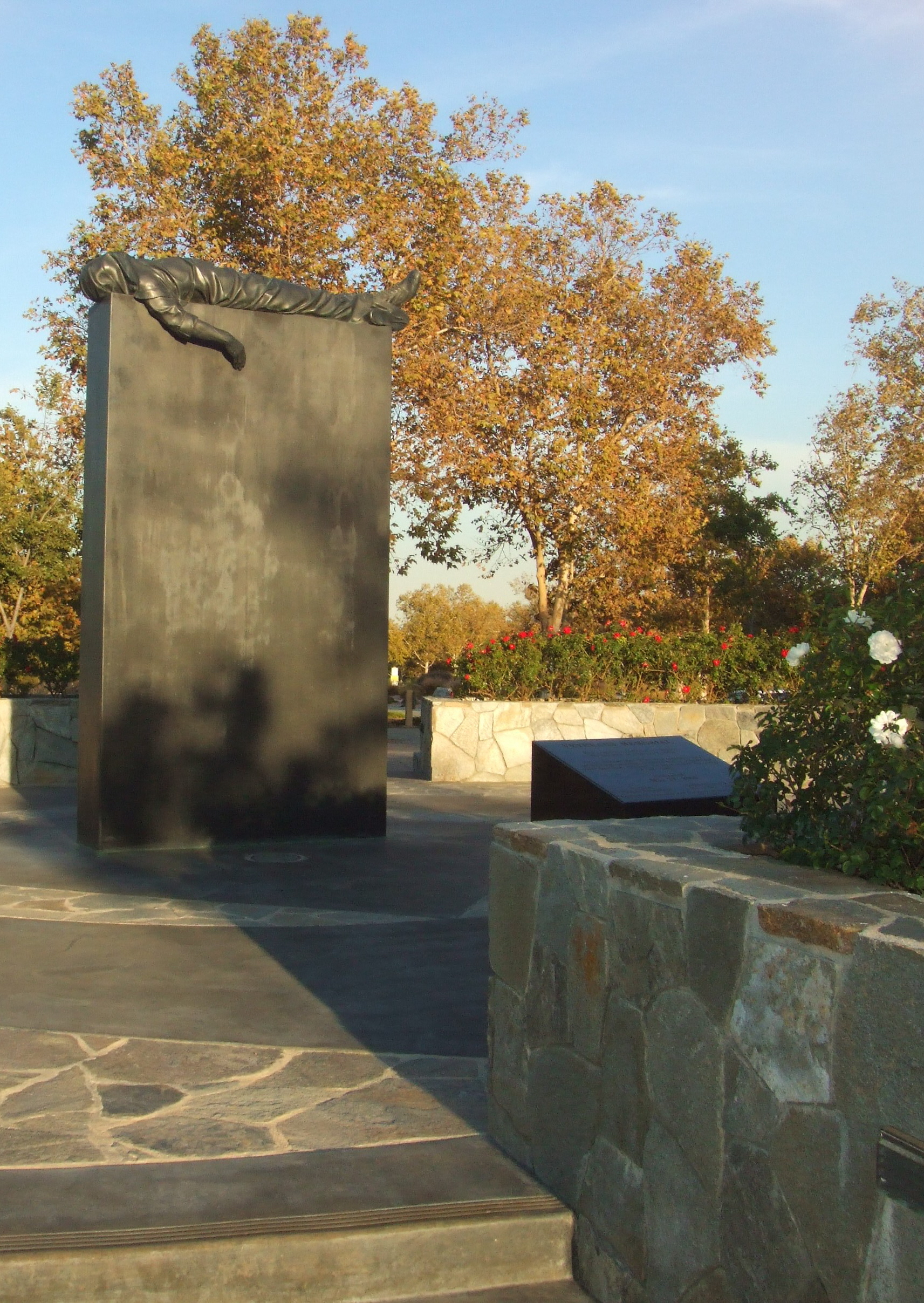
The Veterans Memorial at the Riverside National Cemetery

Riverside National Cemetery is home of the Medal of Honor Memorial, one of four sites in the United States recognized by the U.S. Congress as a National Medal of Honor Memorial Site. The Medal of Honor Memorial, whose walls feature the names of all medal recipients, is located at the third traffic circle in the cemetery. It was dedicated at a ceremony attended by 85 Medal of Honor recipients November 5, 1999.

The statue "Veterans Memorial", created by Colorado sculptor A. Thomas Schomberg, in commemoration of the veterans, their comrades, their personal and emotional sacrifices and to acknowledge those Americans who have lost loved ones in the service of their country. The statue consists of a 12-foot pedestal, on top of which lies the lifeless body of a soldier partially covered with a poncho that hides the face. The unidentified soldier whether a man or woman, private or officer, will forever remain in silent tribute to every American who has given his or her life in combat. The statue was donated to the Riverside National Cemetery by Thomas F. and Judy Kane and was dedicated May 28, 2000.

The Prisoner of War/Missing in Action Memorial was designated a National Memorial by the U.S. Congress on December 10, 2004 and dedicated September 16, 2005. A bronze statue, sculpted by Vietnam veteran Lewis Lee Millett Jr. is the image of an American serviceman on his knees and bound by his captors. The statue is surrounded by black marble pillars, representing imprisonment.

== Notable interments ==
=== Medal of Honor recipients ===
- Staff Sergeant Ysmael R. Villegas (1921–1945), (World War II) U.S. Army, Company F, 127th Infantry, 32nd Infantry Division. Villa Verde Trail, Luzon, Philippine Islands, March 20, 1945
- Commander (then Pharmacist's Mate First Class) John H. Balch (1896–1980), (World War I), U.S. Navy, 6th Regiment, U.S. Marines. Vierzy & Somme-Py, France, July 19, 1918 and October 5, 1918
- Colonel (then Platoon Sergeant) Mitchell Paige (1918–2003), (World War II and Korea) U.S. Marine Corps, 1st Marine Division, Solomon Islands, October 26, 1942
- Colonel Lewis Millett (1920–2009), (WW II, Korea, Vietnam) U.S. Army, February 7, 1951
- 2d Lieutenant (then Staff Sergeant) Walter D. Ehlers (1921–2014), (World War II) U.S. Army, June 9–10, 1944

=== Distinguished Service Cross recipients ===
- John F. Thornell Jr. (1921–1998). World War II triple-ace U.S. Army Air Forces fighter pilot
- Adelbert Waldron (1933–1995). U.S. Army Vietnam War sniper, credited with the highest number of confirmed kills in the war with 109. A two-time recipient of the Distinguished Service Cross in 1969

=== General officers ===
- John Groff (1890–1990). Brigadier General, USMC, and centenarian; recipient of the Navy Cross and Distinguished Service Cross
- Ewart G. Plank (1897–1982). Major General, USA
- Alexander Kreiser (1901–1993). Brigadier General, USMC
- Arthur Exon (1916–2005). Brigadier General, USAF
- Chesley G. Peterson (1920–1990). Major General, USAF; recipient of the Distinguished Service Cross
- George Kenneth Muellner (1943–2019). Lieutenant General, USAF

=== Tuskegee Airmen ===
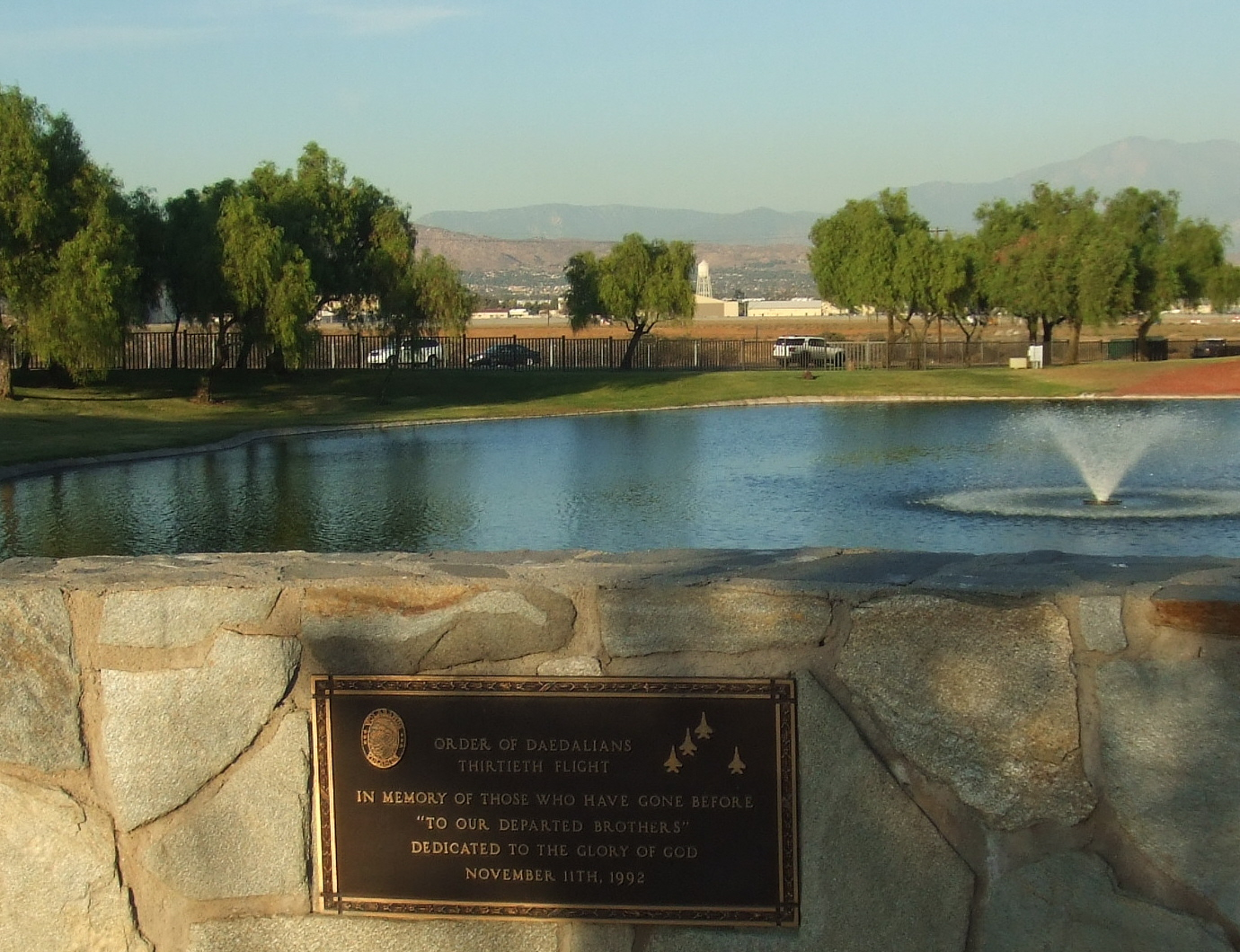
Plaque honoring the Order of Daedalians at the Riverside National Cemetery, with March Joint Air Reserve Base in background

Several members of the legendary Tuskegee Airmen, America's first aviators of African descent, who trained at Alabama's Tuskegee University and flew for the United States Army Air Force, are buried at Riverside National Cemetery.

- 1st Lt. John L. Hamilton, USAAF (1919–1982)
- 1st Lt. Kenneth R. Hawkins, USAAF (1918–2003)
- Major Charles F. Jamerson, USAF (1917–1996)
- 1st Lt. Perry Willis Lindsey, USAF (1922–2004) served during World War II and Korean War
- Chief Warrant Officer John Allen Pulliams Jr., USAF (1919–2002) served during World War II, Korean and Vietnam Wars
- Lt. Col. John L. Whitehead Jr., USAF (1924–1992) served during World War II, Korean and Vietnam Wars
- Captain Hackley E. Woodford, M.D., US Army (1914–2005) served during World War II

=== Others ===
- John Agar (1921–2002). Actor, once married to Shirley Temple. Starred in Westerns and war movies
- James Amrhein - Executive director of the Masonry Institute of America
- Arthur E. Arling (1906–1991). Hollywood cameraman and cinematographer
- Loyd Arms (1919–1999). NFL left guard
- Robert Edward Badham (1929–2005). Lt. j.g., U.S. Navy. California Congressman from 1977–1989
- George Baker (1915–1975). Tech Sgt., U.S. Army, World War II. Disney cartoonist who created the character "Sad Sack”
- Aaron Bank (1902–2004). Colonel, U.S. Army. Founder of the Army Green Berets. OSS officer
- Lena Mae Basilone née Riggi (1913–1999). Sergeant, USMC Women's Reserve, World War II. Widow of Medal of Honor and Navy Cross Recipient, John Basilone. Never remarried and declined interment near her husband at Arlington National Cemetery because "she didn't want to cause trouble for everyone."
- Donald Bevan (1920–2013). Playwright
- Augie Blunt (1929–1999). Actor
- Tommy Bond (1926–2005). Actor and TV producer/director. Played “Butch” in the 1930s “Our Gang” or “Little Rascals”. U.S. Navy, WW II
- Stephen E. Burgio (1912–2001). Supreme Court of New York judge and Nuremberg Trials assistant prosecutor
- Ruth Broe (1911–1983). United States Marine
- Bill Burrud (1925–1990). Child star and travel program host
- Peggy Cartwright (1912–2001). Actress, buried with her United States Army veteran and fellow actor William "Bill" Walker
- Stanley Clements (1926–1981). Actor and comedian
- Paul Comi (1932–2016). Korean War veteran and actor
- Chris Condon (1923–2010). Cinematographer
- Marguerite Courtot (1897–1986). Actress, buried with husband, US Army veteran Raymond McKee
- Edwin A. Doss (1914–2006). World War II and Korean War fighter pilot
- Richard Arnold Epstein (1927–2016). US Navy veteran and mathematician
- Abel Fernandez (1930–2016). Actor
- Dr. Jerry Graham (1928–1997). US Army veteran and professional wrestler
- Gordon Hahn (1919–2001). California politician
- Bernie Hamilton (1928–2008). Actor
- Jesse James "Mountain" Hubbard (1895–1982). Negro leagues baseball player
- George Clayton Johnson (1929–2015). Novelist and screenwriter
- Will "Dub" Jones (1928–2000). Bass vocalist with The Coasters

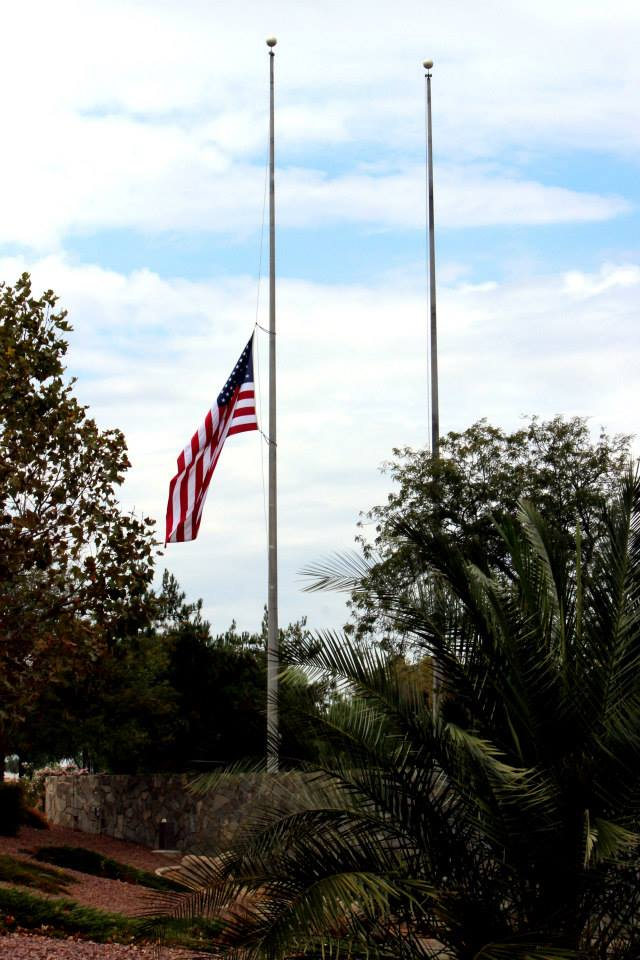
Riverside National Cemetery Flag

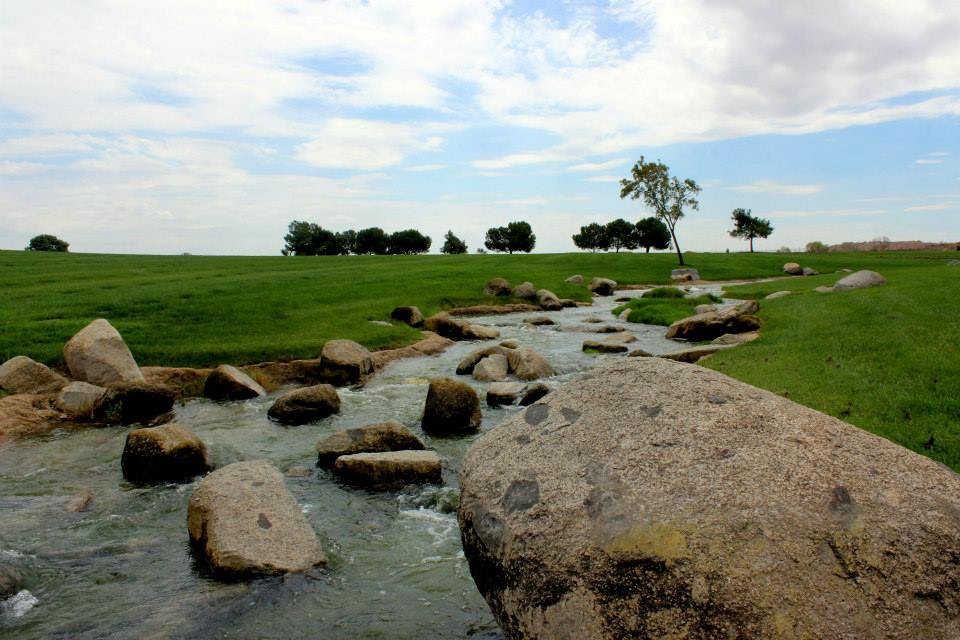
Riverside National Cemetery Riverbed

- Robert Karvelas (1921–1991). Actor
- Lillian Kinkella Keil (1916–2005). Captain, U.S. Air Force. Flight Nurse pioneer. She flew on 425 combat missions and took part in 11 major campaigns during World War II and the Korea War
- Dick Knight (1929–1991). Professional golfer
- David Landsberg (1944–2018), TV and film comedy writer, producer and actor
- Frank John Lubin (1910–1999). Olympic Athlete. Captain of the gold medal winning 1936 Summer Olympics basketball team. Later introduced the sport to Lithuania, where he is considered the father of Lithuanian basketball
- James Richard "Jungle Jim" Martin (1924–2002). CPL US Marine Corps, WWII and professional football player
- Raymond McKee (1892–1983). Actor, buried with his wife, actress Marguerite Courtot
- John J. "Bo" Molenda (1905–1986). WWII US Navy Lt and professional football player
- Patsy Montana (1908–1996). American country music singer
- Joe Morris Sr. (1926–2011). World War II United States Marine Corps veteran and Navajo code talker
- Sydney Omarr (1926–2003). Astrologer
- Earl Palmer (1924–2008). Rock & roll and rhythm & blues drummer
- Jim Pash (1948–2005). Musician and recording artist
- Rod Perry (1934–2020). Actor
- Thelma Pressman (1921–2010). Food writer
- Jeff Richards (1924–1989). Minor league baseball player and actor
- Les Richter (1930–2010). American football player and president of the Riverside International Raceway
- Ned Romero (1926–2017). Actor; World War II United States Army corporal
- Ross Russell (1909–2000). Jazz producer and author, founder of Dial Records
- William G. Schilling (1939–2019). American actor
- Bert Shepard (1920–2008). USAAF pilot who was shot down, suffered an amputated leg, and then pitched and coached with the Washington Senators
- Curtis Howe Springer (1896–1985). Radio evangelist and self-proclaimed medicine man
- Woodrow "Woody" Strode (1914–1994). Professional football player and title role actor in the 1960 John Ford movie Sergeant Rutledge
- Felice Taylor (1944–2017). 1960s soul and pop singer.
- Nathaniel Taylor (1938–2019). Actor
- Paul Toth (1935–1999). Major League Baseball pitcher
- Ed Townsend (1929–2003). Songwriter
- Lorenzo Tucker (1907–1986). Stage and screen actor, known as the "Black Valentino"
- Aurel Toma (1911–1980). Romanian boxing champion
- William "Bill" Walker (1896–1992). Film and television actor. Buried with wife, actress Peggy Cartwright
- Jerry Wallace (1927–2008). American country and pop singer
- Michael Waltman (1946–2011). Film and television actor. Vietnam War veteran and Purple Heart recipient
- Noble Willingham, (1931–2004). Television and film actor
- Ellsworth Wisecarver (1929–2005). Known as the "Woo Woo Kid"
- Benny Zientara (1918–1985). Major League Baseball infielder

== See also ==
- List of national memorials of the United States
