= Everett Francis Briggs =

American activist and priest

The Reverend Everett Francis Briggs MM
- Born: January 27, 1908; Fitchburg, Massachusetts, U.S.
- Died: December 20, 2006 (aged 98); Monongah, West Virginia, U.S.
- Education: College of the Holy Cross (BA)
- Known for: Catholic Church priest

Father Everett Francis Briggs, MM (January 27, 1908 – December 20, 2006) was a Catholic priest and miners' activist who served as a member of the Maryknoll society.

== Early life and education ==
Born in Fitchburg, Massachusetts, Briggs attended St. Patrick's School there and the Maryknoll Seminary. He graduated from the College of the Holy Cross in Worcester, Massachusetts, and the Maryknoll Major Seminary in Maryknoll, New York. In 1933 he was ordained to the priesthood and assigned to Otsu, Japan, as a missionary.

== War time service ==
In 1941, during World War II, he was arrested as a spy and protested by going on a hunger strike. He spent about a year in an internment camp in Japan. In 1943, after his repatriation, when American and Japanese nationals were exchanged, he taught Japanese, then spent six years assigned to the camps in which the United States interned its Japanese citizens.

== Career ==
In 1956, a few days before Christmas, he arrived in Monongah, West Virginia, where he became interested in the history of the Monongah Mining Disaster of December 6, 1907. In the accident, described as "the worst mining disaster in American History", at least 360 miners died; the vast majority of them were Italian Americans. After discovering there was no memorial, he sought to ensure that the victims of the tragedy were not forgotten. He wrote an article, based on his studies, suggesting that there were more than 361 victims of the Monongah Mining Disaster, and that the true number would be upward of 500.

In 1957 Briggs engaged himself in organizing the 50-year anniversary of the explosion. In 1961 he founded Saint Barbara's Memorial Nursing Home (Saint Barbara is the patron saint of miners) in Monongah, as a mining memorial to recognize the Monongah coal miners and all miners who died in mining disasters. He headed the committee that erected a statue At the Heroine of Monongah as a tribute to the widows of the 1907 mining accident and to coal miners’ widows everywhere. The statue is made of Carrara marble and is located near the Town Hall in Monongah.

West Virginia dedicated the bridge that traverses the West Fork River in Marion County in his honor, and named it Father Everett Francis Briggs Bridge. On May 31, 2004, the President of the Italian Republic, Carlo Azeglio Ciampi, recognized his work and conferred the honour of "Cavaliere dell'Ordine della Stella della Solidarietà Italiana" ("Knight of the Order of the Star of Italian Solidarity") upon him. In 2006, when Joe Manchin III, a delegation of Italian dignitaries, and some of the miners' distant relatives from Italy visited Monongah in remembrance of the 1907 accident, he said: I am not Italian and I dedicated almost my entire life to the Italian miners.

== Death ==
Briggs died in Santa Barbara's Memorial Nursing Home in Monongah, and lies in St. Bernard's Cemetery, Fitchburg.
