= John Groff =

United States Marine Corps general

- Born: February 14, 1890; Syracuse, New York, U.S.
- Died: October 2, 1990 (aged 100); Oceanside, California, U.S.
- Burial place: Riverside National Cemetery
- Military career
- Allegiance: United States
- Branch: United States Marine Corps
- Service years: 1912–1919; 1921–1946
- Rank: Brigadier General
- Service number: 99252
- Units: 5th Marine Regiment; 6th Marine Regiment
- Commands: Marine Corps Recruit Depot San Diego
- Conflicts: Occupation of Veracruz; Occupation of Haiti; World War I *Battle of Belleau Wood; *Aisne; *Aisne-Marne; *Meuse-Argonne
- Awards: Navy Cross; Distinguished Service Cross; Silver Star; Purple Heart; Navy Commendation Ribbon

John Groff (February 14, 1890 – October 2, 1990) was a brigadier general in the United States Marine Corps whose military career spanned from 1912 to 1946. Groff was a highly decorated veteran of World War I, earning the Navy Cross, Distinguished Service Cross, Silver Star, and Purple Heart medals. He also participated in the Banana Wars (in Mexico, the Dominican Republic, Haiti, and Nicaragua), and World War II. At the time of his death in 1990 at age 100, BG Groff was the oldest surviving general officer in the Marine Corps.

== Early life ==
Groff was born February 14, 1890, in Syracuse, New York. He attended public school in Syracuse from 1897 to 1904 and in West Chester, Pennsylvania from 1905 to 1908. Prior to enlisting in the Marine Corps, he worked as a sailmaker in Wilmington, Delaware.

== Early career: Mexico and Haiti ==
Groff enlisted in the Marine Corps on October 9, 1912, at Philadelphia, Pennsylvania. Following initial training and a brief two-month stint at Camp Meyer, Cuba in 1913, Groff was assigned to the 46th Company, Special Service Squadron, which sailed for Mexico in April 1914 on board the USS New York (BB-34). While the New York arrived too late to take part in the actual Battle of Veracruz, Groff participated in the United States occupation of Veracruz from May–June 1914. He spent most of the remainder of the year as a gun striker with the 46th Co., 5th Marine Regiment on board the USS Hancock (AP-3) near Santo Domingo City, Dominican Republic.

In 1915, Haiti was rocked by revolutions, which had begun the previous year. By then, Groff was a member of the Marine Detachment on board the USS Washington (ACR-11). He participated in the initial landing force engagement at Port-au-Prince on July 28, 1915. For the remainder of the year, Groff was temporarily assigned to the 2nd Battalion, 2nd Marine Regiment for garrison and occupation duty in the city.

Groff, then a corporal, returned to the United States in early 1916, where he became a plankowner on the USS Oklahoma (BB-37).

== World War I ==
At the outbreak of World War I, Groff's experience in the Banana Wars led to his rapid promotion from corporal to sergeant and then gunnery sergeant. He sailed for France as a member of the 83rd Company, 6th Marine Regiment, which was part of the 2nd Division, American Expeditionary Force. Groff was wounded in action (minor gunshot) and was cited for gallantry on multiple occasions during the Battle of Belleau Wood in June 1918. For his actions, he was awarded the Navy Cross, Distinguished Service Cross, and Silver Star citation. As the result of his actions, Groff also received a battlefield promotion to 2nd Lieutenant in July 1918. After being commissioned as an officer, he was subsequently assigned to the 97th Company, 6th Marines, where he remained until the end of the war. His official World War I Victory Medal campaign credits include Aisne, Aisne-Marne, Meuse-Argonne, and Defensive Sector. Following the cessation of hostilities in November 1918, Groff stayed in Germany until April 1919 as part of the United States Third Army's occupation forces.

=== Navy Cross citation ===
"The President of the United States of America takes pleasure in presenting the Navy Cross to Gunnery Sergeant John Groff (MCSN: 99252), United States Marine Corps, for extraordinary heroism while serving with the 83d Company, 6th Regiment (Marines), 2d Division, A.E.F. in action in the Bois-de-Belleau, France, on 6 June 1918. While out with a patrol to obtain information essential to his commander, Gunnery Sergeant Groff was attacked by a German patrol of superior numbers. With six men he attacked the enemy, inflicted heavy losses upon them, and drove them back into the German lines."

=== Distinguished Service Cross citation ===
"The President of the United States of America, authorized by Act of Congress, July 9, 1918, takes pleasure in presenting the Distinguished Service Cross to Gunnery Sergeant John Groff (MCSN: 99252), United States Marine Corps, for extraordinary heroism while serving with the Eighty-Third Company, Sixth Regiment (Marines), 2d Division, A.E.F., in action in the Bois-de-Belleau, France, on 6 June 1918. While out with a patrol to obtain information essential to his commander, Gunnery Sergeant Groff was attacked by a German patrol of superior numbers. With six men he attacked the enemy, inflicted heavy losses upon them, and drove them back into the German lines."

Award authorized by War Department, General Orders Number 110 (1918).

=== Silver Star citation ===
"By direction of the President, under the provisions of the act of Congress approved July 9, 1918 (Bulletin Number 43, War Department, 1918), Gunnery Sergeant John Groff, United States Marine Corps, is cited by the Commanding General, SECOND Division, American Expeditionary Forces, for gallantry in action and a silver star may be placed upon the ribbon of the Victory Medals awarded him. Gunnery Sergeant Groff distinguished himself while serving with the 83d Company, Sixth Regiment (Marines), 2d Division, American Expeditionary Forces at Chateau-Thierry, France, 6 June – 10 July 1918."

== Inter-war years ==
After World War I, Groff was discharged from the Marine Corps on September 22, 1919. He rejoined the Marine Corps in April 1921 and accepted a permanent commission as a first lieutenant. Shortly thereafter, he was promoted to captain on July 25, 1921, and assigned to Headquarters Company, 10th Marine Regiment, where he served as the signal officer and HQ company commander.

In March 1924, Groff returned to Haiti as the commanding officer of the 148th Company, 8th Marine Regiment, 1st Brigade. He remained in and around Port-au-Prince until February 1926, serving in various units, including Post Headquarters and 36th Company, 1st Brigade, and Headquarters and Headquarters Company, 2nd Marine Regiment.

Upon returning to the United States in March 1926, Captain Groff was assigned to Headquarters Company, 5th Marine Regiment in Quantico, Virginia. When the 5th Marines deployed to Nicaragua in January 1927, Groff served as battalion executive officer until July 1927. For his service in Nicaragua, Groff received an official commendation from the commanding general of 2nd Brigade, USMC.

Groff served at the Marine Barracks, Lakehurst Naval Air Station, New Jersey from August 1927 to May 1929. In July 1929, he returned to Port-au-Prince, Haiti as the Officer-in-Charge Naval Radio Station and Signal Officer of the Brigade Signal Company, 1st Brigade, a duty he retained until May 1931.

After serving several months at the Marine Corps Headquarters in Washington, D.C. and at the Army Quartermaster Subsistence School in Chicago, Illinois, Groff was assigned as the post communications officer, 1st Signal Company, Marine Barracks, at Quantico, Virginia in October 1932. He served in that capacity until August 1936.

In July 1937, Groff, then a major, was transferred to Headquarters Company, Fleet Marine Force, Marine Barracks, San Diego, California, where he served as the fleet communication officer until May 1939.

== World War II ==
Despite requesting overseas duty, Groff remained in the United States for the duration of World War II. In June 1939, he took command of the Marine Corps Recruit Depot in San Diego, California. Additional duties included being the Officer-in-Charge of Drills and Instructions. While the commanding officer of the Recruit Depot, Groff innovated new techniques for improving the efficiency and morale of his new recruits. In October 1939, Groff originated an "Honor Man" plan to promote competition among recruits. Each platoon had one squad leader selected as demonstrating leadership and cooperation. The most competent recruit in each platoon was awarded a special badge. Likewise, in 1941, he experimented with organizing platoons based on recruits' blood types to potentially facilitate blood transfusions at advanced dressing stations. From December 1944 to November 1945, Groff served as chief of staff assigned to Headquarters Company, Base Headquarters Battalion, Marine Corps Base, San Diego.

Colonel Groff was promoted to the rank of brigadier general on March 1, 1946, and retired shortly thereafter.

=== Navy Commendation citation ===
For his service during World War II, Groff was awarded the Navy Commendation Ribbon (later Navy Commendation Medal).

The Secretary of the Navy commends Colonel John Groff, United States Marine Corps, for his service while attached to Marine Corps Base, San Diego, California. He served as Commanding Officer, Recruit Depot, from June to December 1944, and as Chief of Staff to the Commanding General from December 1944 to November 1945. In these roles, Groff supervised recruit training and coordinated administrative activities and other functions at the base. His performance of duty during this period followed United States Naval Service standards.

== Later life and death ==
Following his retirement from the Marine Corps in 1946, General Groff worked as a civilian for the Hughes Aircraft Company and the Douglas Aircraft Company before finally retiring in 1953. Groff died of a heart attack in Oceanside, California on October 2, 1990, at the age of 100. He is interred at Riverside National Cemetery.
