= Commissioners' Plan of 1811 =

Street plan of Manhattan

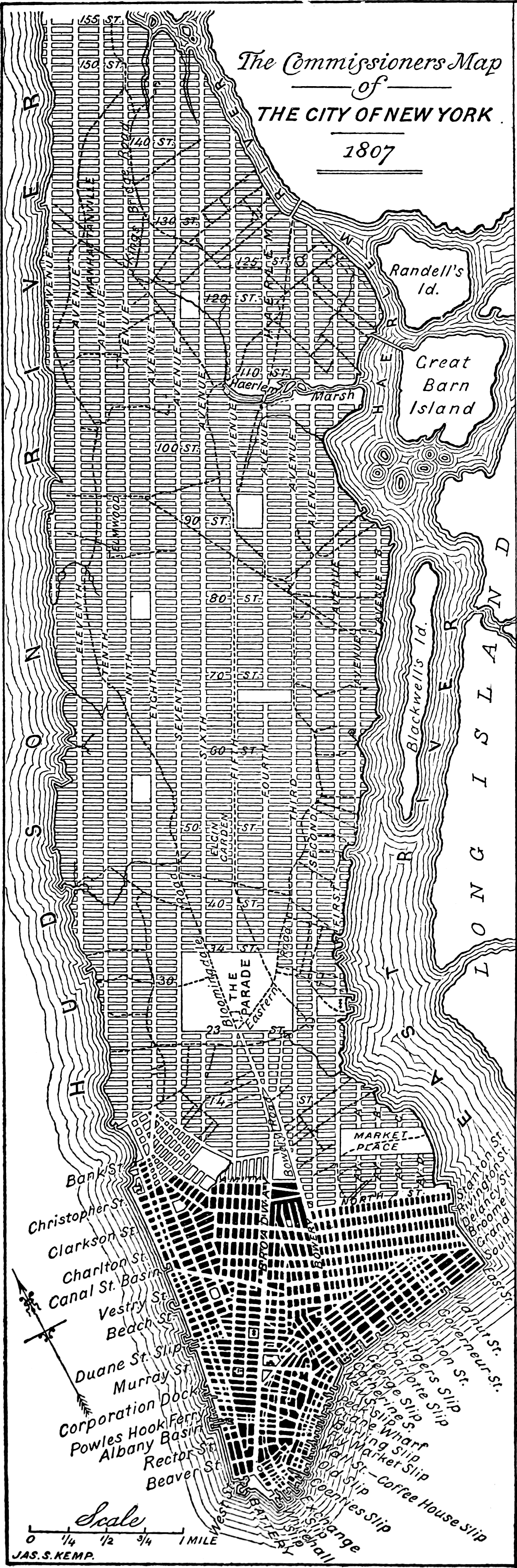
An 1893 redrawing of the 1807 version of the Commissioners' grid plan for Manhattan, a few years before it was adopted in 1811

The city blocks of Portland, Oregon; Savannah, Georgia; and Manhattan shown at the same scale

The Commissioners' Plan of 1811 was the original design for the streets of Manhattan above Houston Street and below 155th Street, which put in place the rectangular grid plan of streets and lots that has defined Manhattan on its march uptown until the current day. It has been called "the single most important document in New York City's development," and the plan has been described as encompassing the "republican predilection for control and balance ... [and] distrust of nature". It was described by the Commission that created it as combining "beauty, order and convenience."

The plan originated when the Common Council of New York City, seeking to provide for the orderly development and sale of the land of Manhattan between 14th Street and Washington Heights, but unable to do so itself for reasons of local politics and objections from property owners, asked the New York State Legislature to step in. The legislature appointed a commission with sweeping powers in 1807, and their plan was presented in 1811.

The Commissioners were Gouverneur Morris, a Founding Father of the United States; the lawyer John Rutherfurd, a former United States senator; and the state Surveyor General, Simeon De Witt. Their chief surveyor was John Randel Jr., who was 20 years old when he began the job.

The Commissioners' Plan is arguably the most famous use of the grid plan or "gridiron" and is considered by many historians to have been far-reaching and visionary. Since its earliest days, the plan has been criticized for its monotony and rigidity, in comparison with irregular street patterns of older cities, but in recent years has been viewed more favorably by urban planners.

There were a few interruptions in the grid for public spaces, such as the Grand Parade between 23rd Street and 33rd Street, which was the precursor to Madison Square Park, as well as four squares named Bloomingdale, Hamilton, Manhattan, and Harlem, a wholesale market complex, and a reservoir. Central Park, the massive urban greenspace in Manhattan running from Fifth Avenue to Eighth Avenue and from 59th Street to 110th Street, was not a part of the plan, as it was not envisioned until the 1850s. The numbering was also extended through Manhattan and the Bronx.

== History of the gridiron ==
The gridiron layout of a town or city is not new; it is "the most pervasive city design on earth" and can be found in "Italy and Greece, in Mexico, Central America, Mesopotamia, China [and] Japan." It existed in the Old and New Kingdoms of Ancient Egypt, in the Indus Valley cities of Harappa and Mohenjo-daro – where many historians claim it was invented – from where it may have spread to Ancient Greece. The Greek city of Miletus was rebuilt after destruction by the Persians on a grid plan, with Hippodamus – often called "the father of European urban planning" – as the local originator of the rectilinear grid system for the city centered on the agora, a concept he probably did not invent, but had heard about from elsewhere. Hippodamus went on to spread the grid to Piraeus, Rhodes, and other cities in Greece.

The grid plan, or "Hippodamian plan", was also utilized by the Ancient Romans for their fortified military encampments, or castra, many of which evolved into towns and cities; Pompeii is the best-preserved example of Roman urban planning using the gridiron system. In France, England, and Wales, castra evolved into bastides, agricultural communities under a centralized monarchy. This example was followed on the European continent in cities such as New Brandenburg in Germany, which the Teutonic Knights founded in 1248, and in the many towns planned and built in the 14th century in the Florentine Republic. The gridiron idea spread with the Renaissance, although in many cities, for instance London following the Great Fire of 1666, it failed to take root. However the rapid expansion of towns and cities during the early industrial revolution developed using a grid street plan such as Whitehaven in Cumbria. In British Empire cities, it necessitated the adoption of new neoclassical urban plans in particular the Scottish Enlightenment 'New Towns' of Edinburgh of 1767 and Glasgow of 1781 were particularly influential in the English-speaking countries. In some European cities, such as Amsterdam and Paris, destruction of parts of the city by fire, warfare and other calamities offered an opportunity for the grid system to be used to replace more evolutionary street layouts, especially in outlying areas, while the central city, often sheltered behind medieval walls, remained organic and undesigned. (Note: Somewhat the opposite situation pertains in modern American cities, where the city itself is, more often than not, laid out in a grid, while the sprawling suburbs which surround it are dominated by curving streets, with side streets, many ending in cul-de-sacs, which offer poor connectivity. In the city, there are multiple routes between two points for either the pedestrian or the automobile driver, while the suburbs force the traveler to choose between a small number of possible routes, and frequently will offer only one path between two points. The curving, poorly connected streets inhibit walking and make it almost inevitable than every journey will be taken by car. The gridded city, then, is highly adaptable, while the ungridded suburb is not. See Rose (2016), pp.124-125)

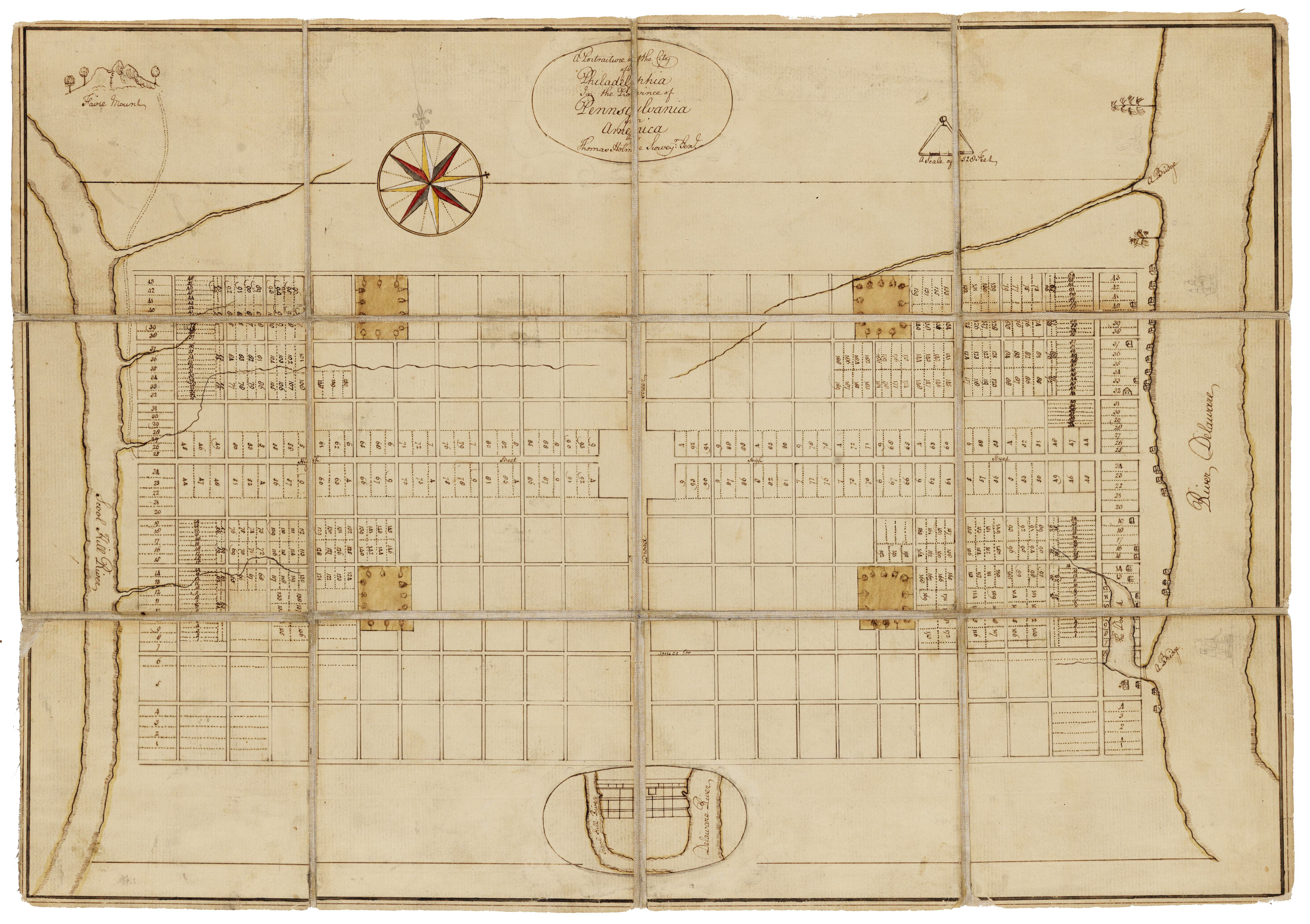
"A Portraiture of the City of Philadelphia" (1683) by Thomas Holme, the first map of the city.

In the United States the gridiron now predominates. In areas that were under Spanish control, the 1753 Laws of the Indies specified the use of the gridiron in newly built communities, and the results can be seen in St. Augustine, Florida; Santa Fe and Albuquerque, New Mexico; and in San Diego, San Francisco, and Los Angeles in California. (Note: In the rest of the Americas, the grid system can be seen in Buenos Aires and Mexico City, among other cities. Koeppel (2015), pp. 1–16.) The French also built the nucleus of New Orleans, Louisiana on a grid, in part influenced by the Spanish Law of the Indies, which provided numerous practical models in the New World to copy from. Although some English colonial cities, such as Boston, had streets that adhered more to natural topography and happenstance, others, such as Savannah, Georgia, Baltimore, and Philadelphia had been built to the gridiron concept from the beginning (Note: A street map of Savannah in 1818 can be found in Ballon, p. 50) – in Philadelphia's case, William Penn specified the city's orthogonal pattern when he founded it in 1682, although its 400-foot (120 m) blocks turned out to be too large, encouraging the creation of intermediate streets, while James Oglethorpe's Savannah, with its significantly smaller blocks, was not conducive to large-scale development, restricting the city's economic influence. New Amsterdam, however, had not been laid out in a grid pattern by the Dutch. The streets of lower Manhattan were more organic, and incorporated Native American trails, cow paths, and streets that followed the topography and hydrology of the swampy land.

By the time of the passage of the federal Land Ordinance of 1785, the grid plan was firmly established in the US. The Ordinance required newly created states west of the original thirteen, to have rectilinear boundaries, rather than boundaries shaped by natural features, and within the new areas, beginning in the Northwest Territory, everything was to be divided into rectangles: townships were six miles by six miles (9.7 km × 9.7 km), sections were one mile by one mile (1.6 km × 1.6 km), and individual lots were 60 by 125 feet (18 m × 38 m). (Note: An example of the grid laid down according to the 1785 law can be found in Ballon, p. 52) Cities such as Anchorage, Alaska; Erie, Pennsylvania; Miami, Florida; and Sacramento, California, all show the American preference for the grid. The effects of the Ordinance of 1785 have been called "The largest single act of national planning in [American] history."

There was significant variation in the size of the grids used. Carson City, Nevada, may have the smallest at 180-foot (55 m) square and 60-foot (18 m) streets, while Salt Lake City, Utah, is much larger at 600-foot (180 m) square blocks surrounded by 120-foot (37 m) streets. The most popular appears to be the 300-foot (91 m) square block with streets that are 60 to 80 feet (18 to 24 m) wide. This size grid can be found in Anchorage; Bismarck, North Dakota; Missoula, Montana; Mobile, Alabama; Phoenix, Arizona; and Tulsa, Oklahoma.

== History of New York City ==
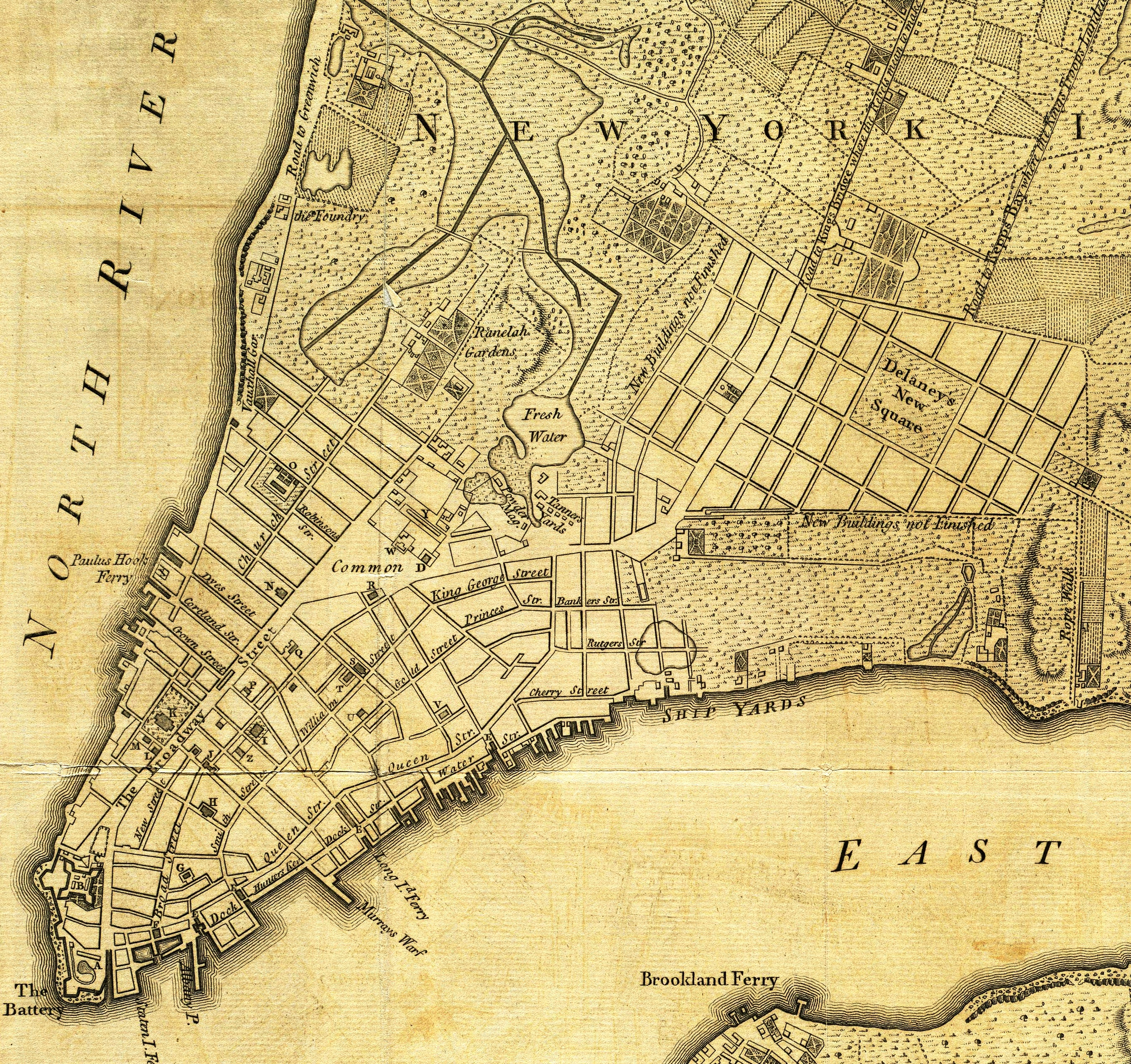
A portion of a map of the city from 1776; De Lancey Square and the grid around it can be seen on the right

The streets of lower Manhattan had, for the most part, developed organically as the colony of New Amsterdam – which became New York when the British took it over from the Dutch without firing a shot in 1664 – grew. The roads were a mixture of country lanes, short streets and Native American and animal trails, all shaped by haphazard history, happenstance and property ownership without any overarching order, until around 1800 when the Common Council of New York began to assert authority over the streetscape, promulgating regulations to keep them clear and to require new streets be approved in advance. They also began to lay assessments on property owners to pay for the cost of keeping the streets in repair. Beginning in 1803, the Council started to condemn streets which served no public purpose, and, importantly, took responsibility for building streets, which heretofore had been done by individual property owners.

=== Private developments ===
The first efforts at putting a grid onto Manhattan in some form came from private developers. In the early 1750s, Trinity Church laid out a small neighborhood around the new King's College – which would later become Columbia University – in rectangular blocks. However, because the plan required landfill in the Hudson River, which would not happen until much later, the streets were never laid down. In 1762, the church had streets surveyed and laid down in a rectilinear grid in the "Church Farm" – which ran from what is now Cortlandt Street to Christopher Street – and offered the plots to artisans and laborers at affordable rents.

The second instance came when the powerful De Lancey family decided to break up part of their vast estate in the 1760s, and laid out a grid of streets centered on "De Lancey Square". As royalists, their holdings were confiscated after the American Revolution, but the streets remained – although a new street, Grand Street, was laid through the central square. The north–south streets of the De Lancey grid become the core north–south streets of the Lower East Side: Chrystie, Forsyth, Eldridge, Allen, Orchard and Ludlow Streets, and the grid became the pattern for additional streets laid out in the area.

The third instance of a privately developed grid in New York City came in 1788, when the long-established Bayard family, relatives of Peter Stuyvesant, hired surveyor Casimir Goerck to lay out streets in the portion of their estate west of Broadway, so the land could be sold in lots. About 100 acres (40 ha) accommodated 7 east–west and 8 north–south streets, all 50 feet (15 m) wide, making up 35 whole or partial rectilinear blocks of 200 feet (61 m) width from east to west, and between 350 feet (110 m) and 500 feet (150 m) long north to south – although near the edges of the estate the grid broke down in order to connect up with existing streets. The Bayard streets still exist as the core of SoHo and part of Greenwich Village: Mercer, Greene, and Wooster Streets, LaGuardia Place/West Broadway (originally Laurens Street), and Thompson, Sullivan, MacDougal, and Hancock Streets, although the last has been subsumed by the extension of Sixth Avenue.

At about the same time as the Bayards, Petrus Stuyvesant, the great-grandson of Peter Stuyvesant, intended to lay out a small grid of streets, nine by four, to create a village on his estate. The orientation of the streets was to be true north–south and east–west, not shifted, as Manhattan Island is, 29 degrees east of true north. The only street to actually be laid was the grid's central east–west axis, Stuyvesant Street, which remains the one street in Manhattan oriented closely to true east and west.

=== The surveying of the Commons ===
==== Goerck's first survey ====
Despite the fact that the city's charters over the decades – the Dongan Charter (1686), the Cornbury Charter (1708) and the Montgomerie Charter (1731) – supported by specific laws passed by the province or state in 1741, 1751, 1754, 1764, 1774 and 1787, gave the city's Common Council full powers over the creation of new streets, the Council rarely did so, independent of the actions of the various landowners who developed their property and ran streets through their projects as they saw fit, which were approved after the fact by the Council. Its first effort to do so came in June 1785 as part of the Council's attempt to raise money by selling property.

The Council owned a great deal of land, primarily in the middle of the island, away from the Hudson and East Rivers, as a result of grants by the Dutch provincial government to the colony of New Amsterdam. Although originally more extensive, by 1785 the council held approximately 1,300 acres (530 ha), or about 9% of the island. Unfortunately, the land was not only of such poor quality – being either rocky and elevated or swampy and low-lying – that it was not suitable for farming or residential estates, it was also difficult to get to because of both the lack of roads and access to waterways.

To divide the Common Lands, as they were called, into sellable lots, and to lay out roads to service them, the Council hired Casimir Goerck, one of a handful of officially approved "city surveyors", to survey them. Goerck, who was related to the Roosevelt family by marriage, was instructed to make lots of about 5 acres (2.0 ha) each – precision in such matters was not to be expected with the available surveying tools, given the topography and ground cover of the Common Lands – and to lay out roads to access the lots. He completed his task in December, only six months later, creating 140 lots of varying sizes. Although not laid out in a gridiron pattern – Goerck was not instructed to do so – most of the lots were organized into two columns of 45 lots with a 65-foot (20 m) road between the columns. The lots were oriented as the lots of the future Commissioners' Plan would be, with the east–west axis longer than the north–south axis; their five-acre size would become the template for the Commissioners' five-acre blocks; and Goerck's middle road would eventually reappear on the Commissioners' Plan, without acknowledgment, as the 100-foot-wide (30 m) Fifth Avenue.

==== Goerck's second survey ====
Unfortunately for the Common Council, the disadvantages of the plots in the Common Lands worked against their sale, and there was no run on the market to buy them. Still, sales continued at a steady, if not spectacular, pace. By 1794, with the city growing ever more populated and the inhabited area constantly moving north towards the Common Lands, the Council decided to try again, hiring Goerck once more to re-survey and map the area. He was instructed to make the lots more uniform and rectangular and to lay out roads to the west and east of the middle road, as well as to lay out east–west streets of 60 feet (18 m) each. Later, the Commissioners would use Goerck's East and West Roads for their Fourth and Sixth Avenues. Goerck's cross streets would become the numbered east–west streets of the later plan. Goerck took two years to survey the 212 lots which encompassed the entire Common Lands. Again, impeded by tools and topography, Goerck's work was somewhat less than precise. In 1808, John Hunn, the city's street commissioner would comment that "The Surveys made by Mr. Goerck upon the Commons were effected through thickets and swamps, and over rocks and hills where it was almost impossible to produce accuracy of mensuration." Often the streets intended to intersect at right angles would not quite do so. (Note: A 19th-century reproduction of Goerck's 1796 map can be seen in Ballon, p. 22. The 1785 map is not extant.)

Still, Goerck's work in surveying the Common Lands was the basis for the Commissioners' Plan, as explained by the New York City Landmarks Preservation Commission: "The Commissioner's Plan borrowed heavily from Goerck's earlier surveys and essentially expanded his scheme beyond the common lands to encompass the entire island." Historian Gerard Koeppel comments "In fact, the great grid is not much more than the Goerck plan writ large. The Goerck plan is modern Manhattan's Rosetta Stone ..." (Note: A graphic indication of the overlap between Goerck's surveys and the Commissioners' Plan can be found in Ballon, pp. 44–45)

=== The Mangin–Goerck Plan ===
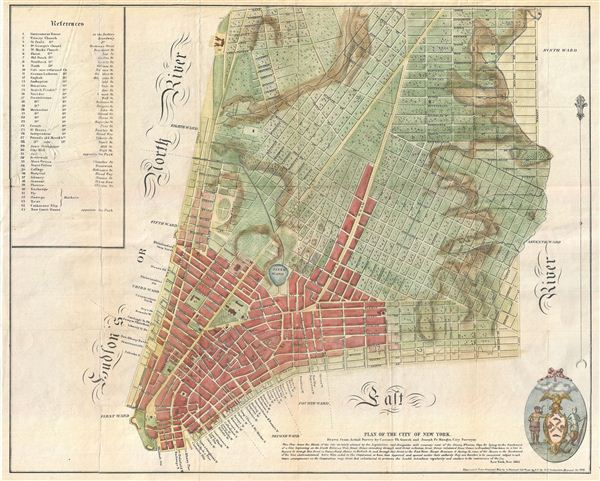
The Mangin–Goerck Plan of 1803; the "warning label" can be seen at the bottom under "Plan of the City of New York"

In 1797, the Council commissioned Goerck and Joseph-François Mangin, another city surveyor, to survey Manhattan's streets; Goerck and Mangin had each submitted individual proposals to the Council, but then decided to team up. Goerck died of yellow fever during the course of the project, but Mangin completed it and delivered the draft of the Mangin–Goerck Plan to the Council in 1799 for correction of street names; the final engraved version – made by engraver Peter Maverick, who would also go on to engrave the published map of the Commissioners' Plan – would be presented to the Council in 1803. However, Mangin had gone well beyond the terms of his commission, and the map not only showed the existing streets of the city, as instructed, but was also, in Mangin's words, "the Plan of the City ... such as it is to be ..."

In other words, the Mangin–Goerck Plan was a guide to where and how Mangin believed future streets should be laid out. It called for enlarging the tip of the island and using landfill to regularize its waterfront. He placed a number of street grids on land that was, at the time, agricultural or undeveloped. The grids, which had different baselines, met up, and there Mangin placed parks and public spaces. He extended the Bayard grid northward, the De Lancey grid to the east and north, and the true north–south/east–west streets of Stuyvesant into the East River. As Gerard Koeppel comments:

In sum, Mangin's plan of the city "such as it is to be" was a synthesizing of patterns already establishing themselves at the suburban fringes of the city and, in the city proper, an orderly filling in east and west with linear streets out to continuous roads along the waterfronts. The city government hadn't asked for it, but it seemed to be just what it wanted.

The Council apparently accepted the plan as "the new Map of the City" for four years, even publishing it by subscription, until political machinations perhaps engineered by Aaron Burr acting through the city's street commissioner, Joseph Browne Jr., brought it into disrepute. Burr – the political enemy of Mangin's mentor Alexander Hamilton – may have been upset that the design of New York's City Hall had gone to Mangin and his partner John McComb Jr., and not to Burr's candidate, Benjamin Henry Latrobe, but for whatever reason, the plan was disavowed by the Council, and was no longer to be considered "the new Map of the City." The Council ordered that copies which had already been sold be bought back if possible, and that a label warning of inaccuracies be placed on any additional copies sold. They stopped short at totally destroying the plan, but, still, neglect may have had the same effect: the original 6-foot (1.8 m) square engraved map has disappeared, and of the smaller versions only less than a dozen are extant, none in good condition.

Nevertheless, despite the Council's official disavowal of Mangin's layout of future streets, as the city grew the Mangin–Goerck Plan became the de facto reference for where new streets were built, and when the Commissioners' Plan was revealed in 1811, the area of the plan which the public had been warned was inaccurate and speculative had been accepted wholesale by the Commission, their plan being almost identical to Mangin's in that area.

== The Commissioners' Plan ==
=== Genesis ===
Politics may have caused the Common Council to officially decertify Mangin's plan for the future expansion of the city, but the episode nonetheless was a step forward in the development of the city's future. In the "warning label" the Council caused to have placed on copies of Mangin's map was the statement that expansion of the city, such as shown on the map, was "subject to such future arrangements as the Corporation may deem best calculated to promote the health, introduce regularity, and conduce to the convenience of the City." Here the Council was showing its willingness to consider actively planning for how the city would develop.

In 1806, they took a first step by hiring Ferdinand Hassler. Hassler, a Swiss mathematician and geodetic surveyor who was noted for his work on a topographic survey of Switzerland, had immigrated to Philadelphia in 1805, two years after the French invaded his country and made his work there impossible. Through the auspices of a merchant friend with friends in New York, in the spring of 1806, the Common Council commissioned Hassler to make an accurate map of Manhattan Island, which could be used as a basis for planning future development; it would be Hassler's first substantial contract in the U.S. He accepted the job, and the terms: $5 per day for Hassler (equivalent to $103 in 2025), $4 a day for his assistant (equivalent to $82 in 2025), and $1 per day for expenses (equivalent to $21 in 2025), plus a budget sufficient to hire a surveying crew. He was scheduled to depart from Philadelphia in July, in time for at least part of the 1806 surveying season, but never appeared. Finally, in October, he sent his regrets: both he and his wife had taken ill on the day they intended to leave. Why they did not send word earlier, why Hassler did not press on at some point before October, and why the Common Council never thought to inquire of the whereabouts of their missing surveyor is not known. In any case, by October, the surveying season for 1806 was over, or close to it. Hassler soon received a federal appointment – he would eventually head the Survey of the Coast (which was renamed the United States Coast Survey in 1836 and the United States Coast and Geodetic Survey in 1878) – so the Council was back at square one.

So, in 1807, they acted again. Optimists at that time expected the city's population, then around 95,000 people, to expand to 400,000 by 1860, when, in fact, it reached 800,000 before the beginning of the Civil War. Faced with opposition and conflict from various political factions, including property owners whose private deeds conflicted with the property lines of the Mangin–Goerck, and the reality that any plan the Council came up with could be overturned by a subsequent Council, the city asked the state legislature for help. The Council said its goal was "laying out Streets ... in such a manner as to unite regularity and order with the public convenience and benefit and in particular to promote the health of the City." At the time, foul air, or "miasma," associated with sewage, standing water and low sunlight, was thought to be the cause of many diseases, and the city had lived through decades of epidemics of yellow fever.

The Commission

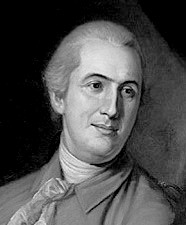
Gouverneur Morris

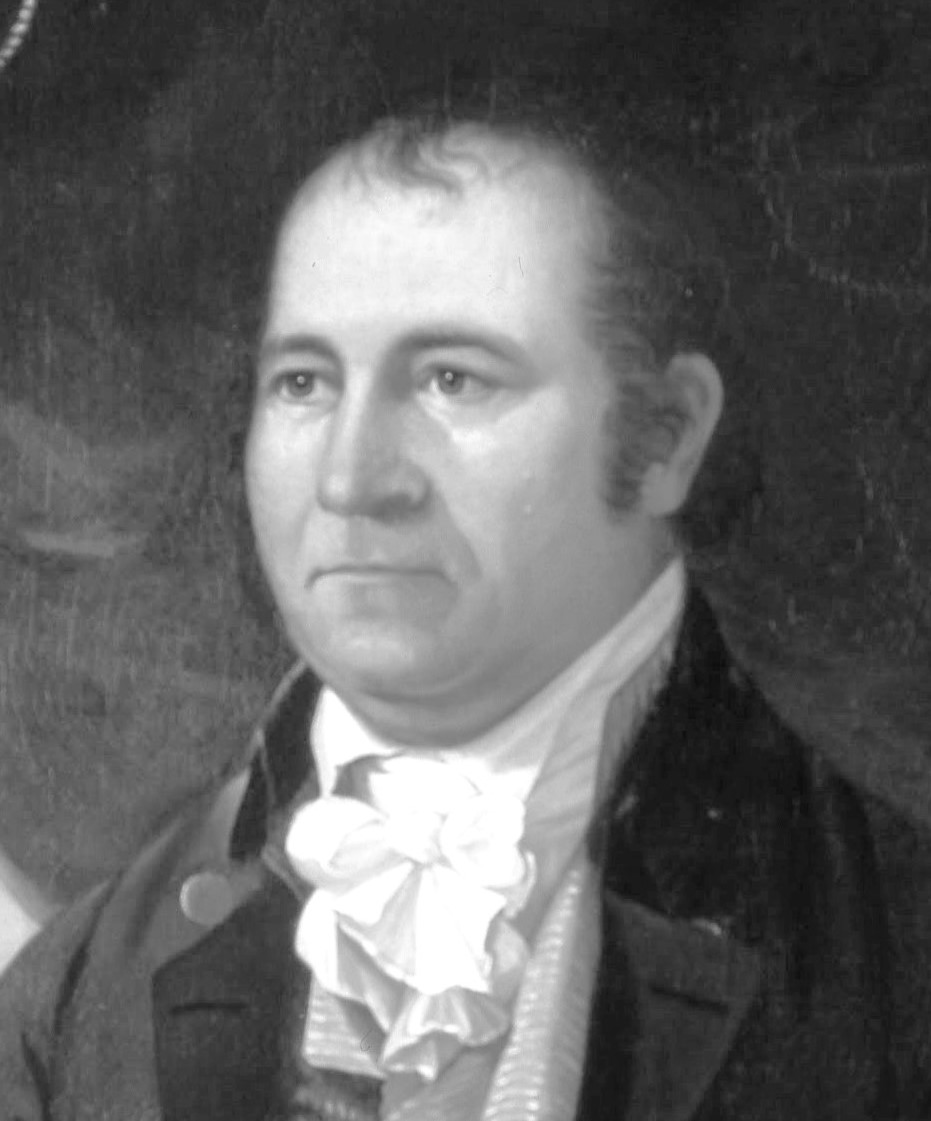
Simeon De Witt

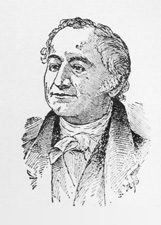
John Rutherfurd

In March 1807, the state legislature responded by appointing as a Commission the three men suggested by the Common Council to establish a comprehensive street plan for Manhattan: Gouverneur Morris, a Founding Father of the United States; the lawyer John Rutherfurd, a former United States Senator representing New Jersey and a relative to Morris by marriage; and the state Surveyor General, Simeon De Witt, a cousin of De Witt Clinton, who was the Mayor of New York City, a State Senator, and the most powerful politician in New York.

A month later, the legislature gave the Commissioners "exclusive power to lay out streets, roads, and public squares, of such width, extent, and direction, as to them shall seem most conducive to public good, and to shut up, or direct to be shut up, any streets or parts thereof which have been heretofore laid out ... [but] not accepted by the Common Council." The jurisdiction of the Commission was all of Manhattan north of Houston Street, and into the Hudson and East Rivers 600 feet beyond the low water mark. They were given 4 years to have the island surveyed, and then to produce a map showing the placement of future streets. There were few specifications given to them about those streets, except that streets were to be at least 50 feet (15 m) wide, while "leading streets" and "great avenues" were to be at least 60 feet (18 m) wide. (Note: The text of the April act can be read at Ballon, pp. 30–32)

The baseline of the Commissioner's remit was set at Houston Street – "North Street" at the time – "Art Street", which was located approximately where Washington Square North is today, and "Greenwich Lane", now Greenwich Street. Greenwich Village, then independent of New York City, and the current West Village were not part of the area the Commission was to deal with.

Morris was not named the president of the Commission, but acted as such. A majority of Commissioners was required to make decisions. The Commissioners were authorized to be paid $4 a day for their work (equivalent to $88 in 2025) – although Morris and Rutherfurd, both rich men, waived their fees – and were empowered to enter onto private property in the daytime to undertake their duties; this was greeted with widespread hostility from property owners, but the Commission's authority was explicit. They held, for instance, the "exclusive power" to close streets that interfered with their plan, a plan which landowners as well as the mayor, the Common Council and all other citizens of the city had no choice but to accept.

At the meetings of the Commission, which were infrequent and usually not attended by all three men, their primary concern was what kind of layout the new area of the city should have, a rectilinear grid such as was used in Philadelphia; New Orleans; Savannah, Georgia; and Charleston, South Carolina, or a more complex system utilizing circles, arcs or other patterns, such as the plan Pierre Charles L'Enfant had used in laying out Washington, D.C. In the end, the Commission decided on the gridiron as being the most practical and cost-effective, as "straight-sided and right-angled houses are the most cheap to build and the most convenient to live in."

=== Surveying the island ===
==== False start ====
In order for the Commissioners to determine what the future of New York City's streets would be, they needed to know the precise location of the current streets, which meant that most of the four years they were given for their task would be taken up with surveying Manhattan island.

The Commission's first chief surveyor was Charles Frederick Loss, who, like Mangin and the deceased Goerck, was an officially recognized city surveyor, a position he received contingent on becoming a naturalized American citizen. Unfortunately Loss did not appear to be a very competent surveyor, as several of his ventures had serious errors, which eventually resulted in his being relieved of his position in 1811. Loss exhibited the same lack of ability as the chief surveyor for the Commission, and finally the Commission made an agreement with Loss that he would do only the first task that had been assigned to him: to make a map of Manhattan island, and get accurate measurements for the location of certain streets which would provide a framework for the plan of future streets. For this, Loss would receive no wages but a simple fee of $500 (equivalent to $10,994 in 2025). Loss was to deliver the map by May 1808.

The only known image of John Randel Jr., the Commission's chief surveyor, by an unknown artist, probably Ezra Ames.

==== Randel joins the project ====
The Commissioners' replacement as chief engineer and surveyor, John Randel Jr., took over the position in June 1808; the project would occupy him for most of the next 13 years. Randel had been apprenticed to De Witt, and when he became an assistant surveyor in De Witt's office, he interpreted the field reports of other surveyors to draft maps based on them of land in the Adirondack Mountains and on the Oneida Reservation, mapped the Albany Turnpike between Albany and Schenectady and the Great Western Turnpike from Albany to Cooperstown, and surveyed property lots in Albany and in Central New York, particularly Oneida County. When he was hired by the commission – on De Witt's suggestion and with Morris' approval – he was still a relatively inexperienced 20-year-old.

Randel's surveying in 1808 had nothing to do with laying out the grid, which had not yet been determined as the final result of the Commission's work. Instead, he was determining the topography and ground cover of the land and the placement of natural features such as hills, rocks, swamps, marshes, streams, and ponds, as well as man-made features such as houses, barns, stables, fences, footpaths, cleared fields and gardens. He was also carefully noting the locations of the three north–south roads that Goerck had laid down as part of his survey of the Common Lands. Goerck had not placed the lots and roads in the Common Lands in the context of the overall island, and this Randel did, thus allowing the Commissioners to know where, exactly, Goerck's Common Lands grid was. This was important, because it could serve as a template for a grid for the entire island, should the Commission decide to go in that direction.

Randel wrote afterwards that in the course of his work he "was arrested by the Sheriff, on numerous suits instituted ... for trespass and damage by ... workmen, in passing over grounds, cutting off branches of trees. &c., to make surveys under instructions from the Commissioners." In August 1808, Randel was sued by a landowner for trespass and causing damage to the landowner's property, such as cutting down trees and trampling on crops; $5000 was requested in damages, but the landowner received only $109.63, just enough to cover his court costs. Nonetheless, the potential for future problems was real. Gouverneur Morris asked the Common Council for a means of protecting the necessary actions of the surveyors, but, for political reasons, the council could not agree on a solution, and passed the buck, again, to the state legislature. With the Commissioners threatening to resign if something was not done about the "vexatious interruptions", the legislature acted in 1809 with a law providing that if the needed actions to perform the survey could not be performed "without cutting trees or doing damages" and "reasonable notice" was to be provided by the Commission or the surveyors to the landowner, and they were to view the property together to assess the situation. The landowner was to present a bill for "reasonable damages", which the city was to pay within 30 days; any disagreement among the parties as to what was reasonable would, of course, end up in court. The new law did not completely stop lawsuits, but it cut down their number, and allowed Randel to go about his business with a degree of immunity from legal entanglements.

In 1809, Randel's surveying again seems to have been focused on positioning the Common Lands, and Goerck's lots and streets in it, to the rest of the island. Goerck had shown their relationship to the Bloomingdale Road to the west, much of which would become part of Broadway, and the East Post Road to the east, a road which would be demapped by the Commissioners' Plan. Little is known about Randel's surveying in 1810.

And in the meantime, the Commissioners were, generally speaking, distracted by various other personal and political business; although they met – infrequently – there is no record of what they discussed, or if they were getting closer to a decision about what their plan would entail. Finally, on November 29, 1810, with the surveying season for that season over and only four months left before they were to report out their plan, they seemed to have arrived at a decision. On that date, Morris informed the Common Council that although more work was left to be done "on the ground", the Commission itself had "completed their work" and would be able to make a report that would "compl[y] substantially, if not literally within the law, shewing [sic] all the streets which to be laid out ..." Randel then spent a considerable amount of time in December meeting with Morris and perhaps the other Commissioners at Morris' estate in the Bronx, during which time it appears that the grid plan was born. At Morris' suggestion, the Common Council hired Randel to actually do the extensive work involved in making the grid a physical reality – although city surveyor William Bridges (see below) also submitted a proposal to do the work – and Randel began this work even before the Commissioners' Plan was announced publicly. A provisional contract between the Council and Randel was signed on December 31, the permanent contract being conditional on Randel delivering the final maps of the plan, which he did on March 22, 1811; the maps were filed by the Council's clerk on April 2, two days before the Commission's legal deadline.

Randel's survey of the entire island – 11,400 acres (4,600 ha) – had begun in 1808 and was completed in 1810, and he now prepared the drafts of the new grid without regard to the topography of the land. The three maps were large, almost nine feet in length when connected together. Commissioner Simeon De Witt said of Randel's work that it was made "with an accuracy not exceeded by any work of the kind in America." Randel himself would later write that "The time within which the Commissioners were limited by the Statute to make their Plan of the streets, avenues, and public places on Manhattan [was] barely sufficient to enable them to comply with the letter, although not fully with the spirit, of the Statute." (italics in original)

If it should be asked why was the present plan adopted in preference to any other, the answer is, because, after taking all circumstances into consideration, it appeared to be the best; or, in other and more proper terms, attended with the least inconvenience.

–The Commission, from their "Remarks"

=== The plan ===
The format chosen by the Commissioners was a rectilinear grid, or "gridiron": straight streets and avenues intersecting each other at right angles. Legal historian Hendrick Hartog writes that their choice was resonant with the political values of the country, which only recently gained independence from Great Britain. According to Hartog, the grid was: "... the antithesis of a utopian or futuristic plan." It extolled ordinary everyday life, and emphasized that "government ought not to act in such a way as to create inequality of special privilege." The Plan's "hidden agenda" was "[t]he reconstruction of the natural environment to fit the requirements of republican authority." Even though "[t]he Commissioners wrote as if all they cared about was protecting the investments of land developers and maintaining government-on-the-cheap ... the plan ... however, served to transform space into an expression of public philosophy," which emphasized equality and uniformity. "In a city shaped by rectangular blocks, all structures and activities would look roughly the same. Individual distinctions, whether cultural, charitable, economic, or whatever, would have to find their place within a fixed, republican spatial organization."

==== Streets and avenues ====
The Commissioners published their plan in March 1811 in the form of an eight-foot (2.4 m) map – redrawn by the otherwise little known William Bridges from Randel's original, and engraved by Peter Maverick – with an accompanying 54-page pamphlet. (Note: A fairly large-scale fold-out version of the map can be found at Ballon, pp. 34–36, and a zoomable version is available online at "Map of the city of New York and island of Manhattan as laid out by the commissioners appointed by the Legislature, April 3, 1807" New York Public Library Digital Collections) The grid had 12 primary 100 feet (30 m) wide north–south avenues and numerous cross streets arranged in a regular right-angled grid tilted 29 degrees east of true north to roughly replicate the angle of Manhattan island. The Commission chose not to use circles and ovals such as Pierre L'Enfant had used in his design of Washington D.C., convinced that simple rectangles were best, the most convenient and easiest to build on, and therefore the most conducive to the orderly development of the city. The combination of north–south avenues and east–west streets at the specified dimensions was the creation of approximately 2000 long, narrow blocks.

Except in the north and south ends of the island, the avenues would begin with First Avenue on the east side and run through Twelfth Avenue in the west. In addition, where the island was wider, there would be four additional lettered avenues running from Avenue A eastward to Avenue D. Some of the avenues, such as Twelfth Avenue, ran through land that did not as yet exist, but the state legislation which created the Commission also authorized the city to extend its boundaries 400 feet (120 m) into the Hudson and East Rivers, so the land required for these new streets would eventually be created. Broadway, an existing road, was not included in the 1811 plan, and was added to the grid later.

The plan also called for 155 orthogonal cross streets. The location of the cross streets was fixed at the boundaries of 5-acre (2.0 ha) parcels into which the land had previously been divided. The basepoint for the cross streets was First Street: this was a short and inconspicuous street, which still exists, and originally ran from the intersection of Avenue B and Houston Street to the intersection of the Bowery and Bleecker Street. Peretz Square, a small, narrow triangular park bounded by Houston Street, 1st Street, and First Avenue, is the grid's cornerstone.

The numbered streets running east–west are 60 feet (18 m) wide, with about 200 feet (61 m) between each pair of streets, resulting in a grid of approximately 2,000 long, narrow blocks. With each combined street and block adding up to about 260 feet (79 m), there are almost exactly 20 blocks per mile. Fifteen crosstown streets were designated as 100 feet (30 m) wide: 14th, 23rd, 34th, 42nd, 57th, 72nd, 79th, 86th, 96th, 106th, 116th, 125th, 135th, 145th and 155th Streets.

The width of the crosstown blocks was irregular. The distance between First and Second Avenues was 650 feet (200 m), while the block between Second and Third Avenues was 610 feet (190 m). The blocks between Third and Sixth Avenues were 920 feet (280 m), while the blocks between the avenues from Sixth to Twelfth were 800 feet (240 m). Lexington and Madison Avenues were added after the original plan. The shorter blocks near the Hudson and East River waterfronts was purposeful, as the Commissioners' expected that there would be more development there at a time when water-based transportation was still significant. The Commission expected that street frontage near the piers would be more valuable than the landlocked interior, the waterfront being the location of commerce and industry of the time, and so it would be to everyone's benefit to place avenues closer together at the island's edges. Although varied, the width of all the avenues were sufficient to accommodate large numbers of horse-drawn mass transportation vehicles such as the horse-drawn omnibus, which would soon appear in Manhattan in the late 1820s, but the precursors to which had been operating in Paris as early as 1662, operated by philosopher Blaise Pascal.

A curiosity about the grid plan the Commissioners chose for New York City is that while many other cities used a square grid, they did not. Perhaps influenced by the dimensions of the island, which is longer north–south than it is east–west, Manhattan's blocks are long rectangles, with the east–west dimension, while varied, larger than the big grid of Salt Lake City, while the north–south dimension, at 200 feet (61 m), just 20 feet (6.1 m) longer than the small grid of Carson City. Historian Gerard Koeppel remarks that "while the grid brought order to the place, it also made it a place of extremes."

In implementing the grid, existing buildings were allowed to remain where they were if at all possible, but if removal was necessary the owners would receive compensation from the city, although appeal was available to a special panel appointed by the state's highest court. (See "Opening" and "regulating" the streets below) In 2011, it was estimated that 39% of the buildings north of Houston Street which were standing in 1811 (721 out of 1,825) had to be moved. On the other hand, if the plan improved the accessibility of a property, the city was authorized to levy an assessment on the owner for the improvement, a method previously used by the city after building public amenities, such as wells.

The Commissioners' Plan did not in any way specify what the size of individual lots within the blocks should be, although the size and rectangular nature of the blocks lent itself to rectangular lots of equal size to fit into the block. A standard lot was 100 feet (30 m) deep, which was half the depth of the block, and 20 or 25 feet (6.1 or 7.6 m) wide, depending on the location. By removing most of the topographical features which had once defined lot boundaries, the grid turned land into a commodity, which could be easily bought and sold in roughly equal-sized units, thus rationalizing the real estate market.

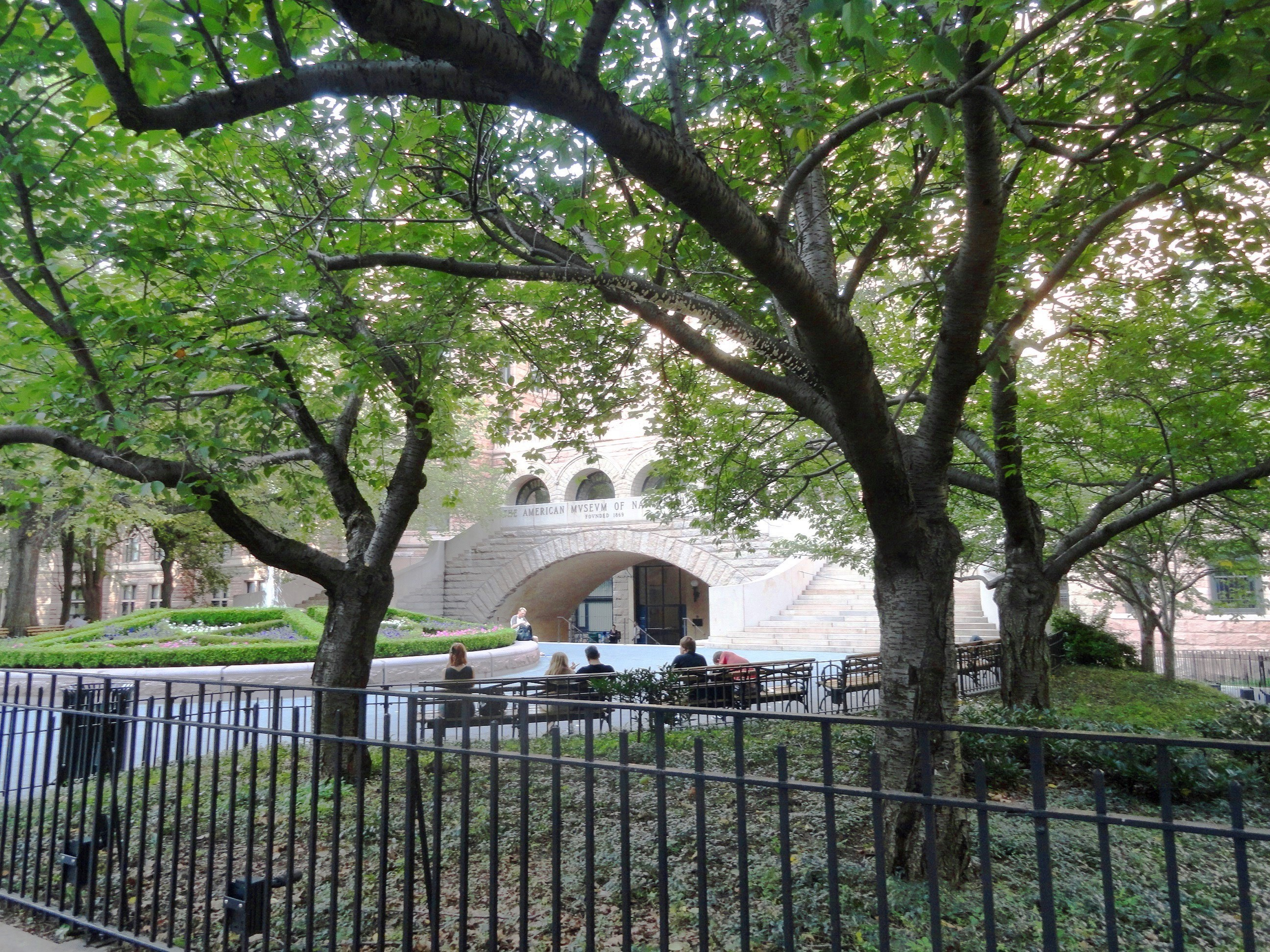
The park-like grounds of the American Museum of Natural History – called "Theodore Roosevelt Park" since 1958, but officially part of Central Park – is the only one of the planned public spaces of the Commissioners' Plan which still exists; it was to be "Manhattan Square".

==== Public spaces ====
Conspicuous by their relative absence from the plan were amenities for the city's population, including parks and plazas. The legislature which had created the Commission called for it to provide public areas but, perhaps because they underestimated the growth potential of the city, they laid out very few of these. The primary one was the Grand Parade of 275 acres (111 ha) between 23rd and 33rd Street and between Third and Seventh Avenues, which was to be an open space slated for military drilling and for use as an assembly point in the event the city was invaded. At the time, some thought that the Grand Parade might become a "central park" for the city, but the grounds were gradually reduced over the course of time, until what was left was the current Madison Square Park.

The Commission also placed squares significantly smaller than the Grand Parade at 53rd to 57th Street between Eighth to Ninth Avenues (Bloomingdale Square), 66th to 68th Street from Third to Fifth Avenue (Hamilton Square), 77th to 81st Streets between Eighth and Ninth Avenues (Manhattan Square), and 117th to 121st Street between Sixth and Seventh Avenues (Harlem Square). Observatory Place, 26 acres (11 ha) intended for a reservoir, stood at 89th to 94th Streets between Fourth and Fifth Avenues, and there was a large 54-acre (22 ha) space in what became the East Village, from 7th to 10th Streets and from First Avenue to the East River, intended as a wholesale market complex. (Note: It is not possible to tell from the map whether the "Garden" listed between 47th and 51st Streets and Fifth and Sixth Avenues was an existing feature or a planned one; possibly the former as there is no break indicated in the planned streets. See "Map of the city of New York and island of Manhattan as laid out by the commissioners appointed by the Legislature, April 3, 1807" New York Public Library Digital Collections (zoomable map) Haerlem Marsh, from 106th to 109th Streets between the East River and Fifth Avenue is shown in the map, but is not gridded, as the technology of the time would not allow it to be filled in until 1837. See Koeppel (2015), p. 124)

Of the public spaces created by the Commission, only Manhattan Square has survived – since 1958 called Theodore Roosevelt Park, with part of it called Margaret Mead Green since 1979 – as the grounds around the American Museum of Natural History. The park officially became a part of Central Park as of 1874. The Grand Parade was first reduced from 240 acres (97 ha) to 90 acres (36 ha) by 1815, and then demapped altogether, except for 7 acres (2.8 ha) which survives as Madison Square Park. The market in the East Village was whittled down from 51 acres (21 ha) to 16 acres (6.5 ha), then scrapped altogether, though a portion was later reclaimed for 10.5 acres (4.2 ha) Tompkins Square Park.

One of the reasons behind the lack of inland open spaces in the plan was the belief of the Commissioners that the public would always have access to the "large arms of the sea which embrace Manhattan Island", the Hudson and East Rivers, as well as New York Harbor. They considered that if New York was a city such as Paris or London, located along the relatively small Seine and Thames River, then more parkland "for the benefit of fresh air and consequent preservation of health" would have been necessary. The Commissioners did not consider the proliferation of roadways, docks, wharves, rail yards, quarries and commercial sites which would essentially block the public from access to the rivers until the late 20th century, when a combination of factors began to make the riversides once again accessible, at least in narrow strips of greenways.

==== Randel and William Bridges ====
There was a private controversy regarding the publication of the map of the Commissioners' Plan. Randel had begun to prepare a map to go to the engraver, using his original papers, when he found out that the council had given William Bridges, another of the handful of city-recognized surveyors, the right to do so. Bridges simply copied one of Randel's previously published maps, which were in the public domain, without access to the supporting material Randel had accumulated, introducing errors as he did so, some of them possibly intentional, since he was legally bound not to copy the map exactly. Bridges published and copyrighted the resulting map as a private venture, leaving Randel out in the cold: his name did not appear anywhere on Bridges' map.

The conflict between the two men did not come to a head until three years later, in 1814, when Randel starting advertising his own version of the Commissioners' Plan map, which he said was "more correct" than the previously published one – he did not mention Bridges by name – not only because of the errors he claimed had crept into the map when Bridges copied it, but because he, Randel, "has since completed the measurements and fixed monuments by contract with the [Common Council], [therefore] he alone is possessed of all the materials for this valuable work." He published a letter from Gouverneur Morris, who called Randel's map "an excellent work ... indispensable to those who wish to make themselves acquainted with the Topography of that interesting space which is comprizes [sic]. It appears to me more accurate than anything of the kind which has yet appeared. ... I consider it highly deserving of public patronage." Bridges shot back, commenting that Randel was "unprincipled", and "conceited", and lacking in "honorable conduct". Randel, of course, responded, listing many, but not all, of the errors in Bridges' map, including islands that were not the right length, width, or in the wrong place, rocks and hills misplaced and mis-sized, rivers and forts too close to each other, missing and misplaced buildings, and streets shown as closed which were not. Bridges, whose reputation both as a surveyor and as a man was far from clean, did not reply, perhaps because his wife was sick at the time and died several months after Randel's second letter. In any case, Bridges himself died shortly after that, and Randel did not publish his map or have it engraved at that time, due to national security concerns connected with the War of 1812. He eventually published it in 1821.

=== Executing the plan ===
==== Laying out the grid ====
Marguerite Holloway, Randel's biographer, divides his work in New York into three periods. The first, from 1808 to 1810, resulted in the 1811 publication of the Commissioners' Plan. The final phase was from around 1818 to 1821, when Randel and his first wife Matilda became high-quality cartographers, makers of maps. In 1811, it was time for Randel to enter stage two, during which he completed the necessary geodetic surveying and inscribed the grid into the land.

Even with the publication of the Commissioners' Plan, the work of gridironing Manhattan was far from done. Randel's map only showed 16 elevation points for the entirety of Manhattan island, and many more would be needed. In addition, very few of the streets were actually placed into the physical landscape of the island; 125th Street, for instance, was the northernmost street for which Randel had an actual physical position. These tasks, that of completing the survey with elevations, along with marking the actual positions of the notional streets of the plan, would take Randel another six years, until about 1817, supervised by a committee of five aldermen, as the Commission had disbanded once it had discharged its legal responsibility.

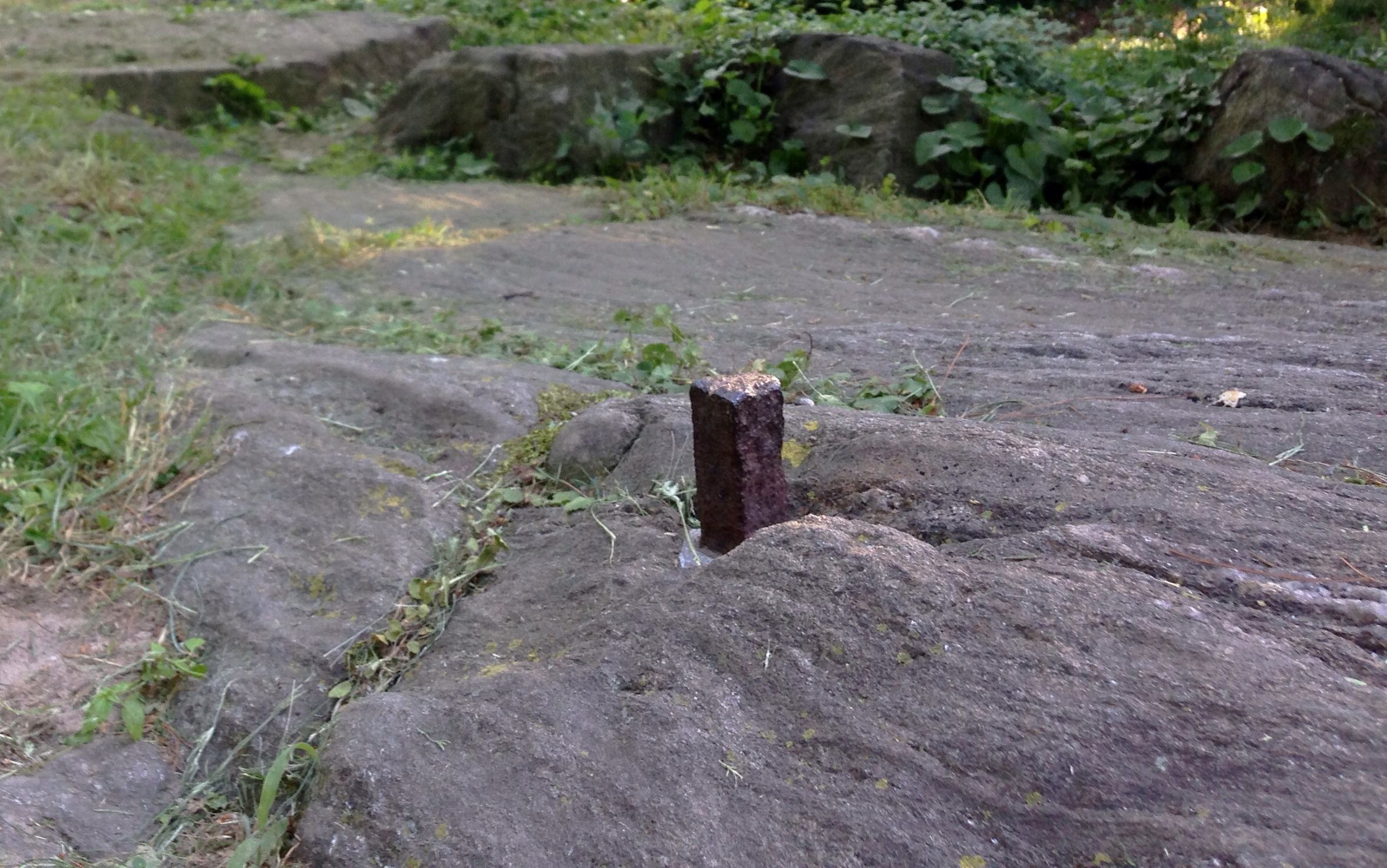
This one of John Randel's survey bolts marked the location of what would have been Sixth Avenue and 65th Street; the location later became part of Central Park

To do this work, Randel was given an allocation of $1,000 for surveying instruments (equivalent to $19,350 in 2025), but he also spent his own money – between $2,400 (equivalent to $46,440 in 2025) and $3,000 (equivalent to $58,050 in 2025) – developing seven surveying instruments which, among other benefits, would not vary in size because of temperature changes, resulting in great precision. An expert in Colonial era surveying equipment has expressed the opinion, after closely examining images of Randel's new instruments – the pamphlet that explained them has been lost – that Randel was "Basically ... a mechanical genius."

To inscribe the grid onto the land, Randel and his staff erected almost 1,600 markers – primarily three-foot-long (0.91 m), nine-inch-square (23 cm) marble monuments inscribed with the number of the street, placed at each intersection. Where rocks prevented the use of the marble markers, they blasted a hole with gunpowder, inserted six-inch-long (15 cm) iron bolts that were one inch (2.5 cm) square, and embedded them with molten lead. In all, they positioned 1,549 marble markers and 98 iron bolts to define the pattern of the grid.

As Randel's work proceeded, and landowners could see for themselves, on the ground and not on a map, where the planned streets would be, some of them took action to fight against the plan, not only destroying temporary measurement pegs, but also digging up the marble markers. Randel simply replaced the pegs and the markers, and the Common Council covered the cost of doing so, allocating Randel $4,000 (equivalent to $75,882 in 2025), although they refused to pay him $11,479.31 (equivalent to $217,769 in 2025) he asked for to cover the cost of re-measuring with his new instruments what he had previously measured. The Council reasoned that it was Randel's job to be accurate, so additional fees were not justified.

After 1813, when they were married, Randel's wife Matilda joined him in the Harlem house he rented, participating in his work by helping with drawing of maps, but not by going out on the surveying trips.

==== Mapping the grid and the land ====
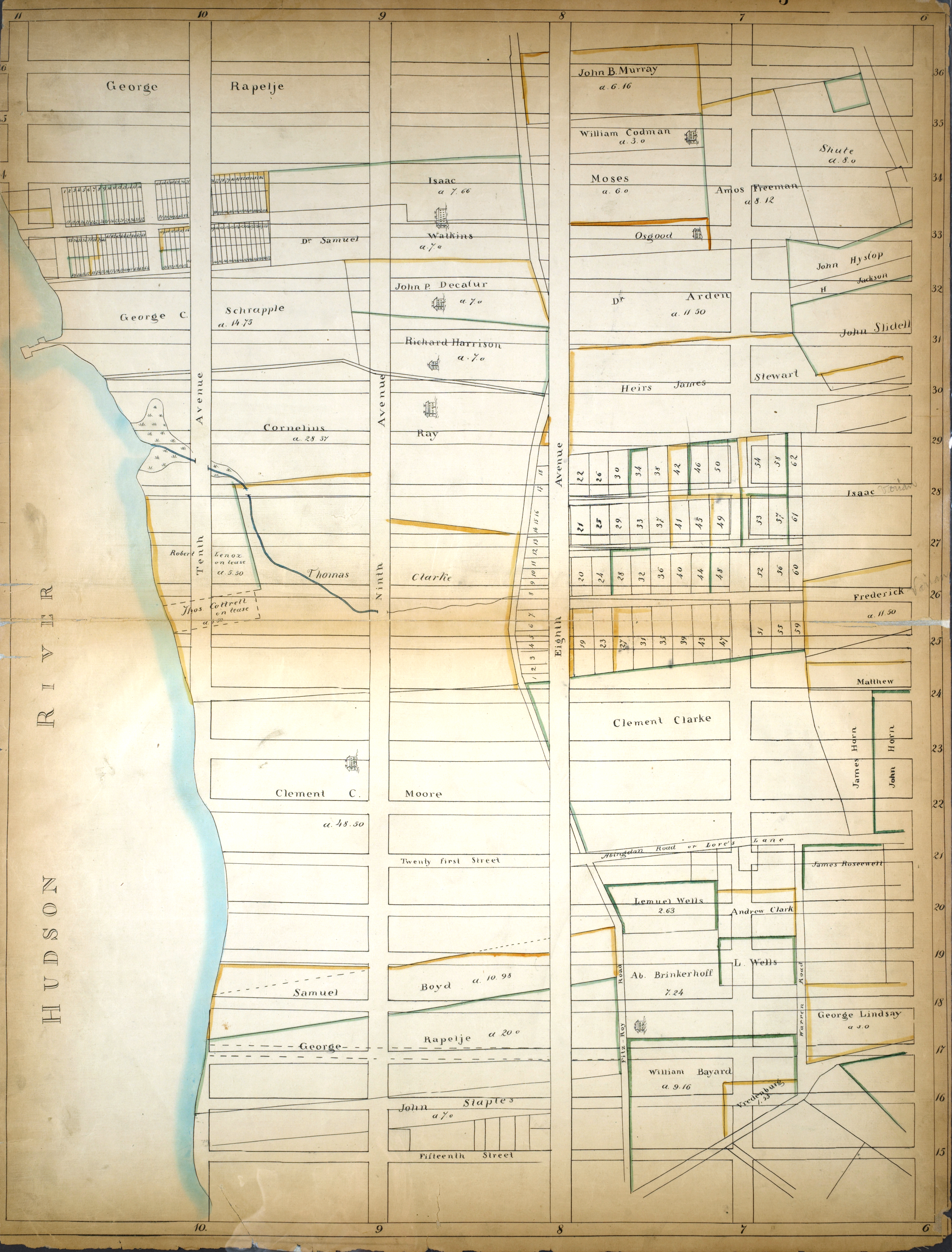
One of Randel's 92 detailed "Farm Maps", showing how the Manhattan grid would sit on the island's topography and extant farms and homesteads. This one is bounded by West 36th Street, Sixth Avenue, West 15th Street, and the Hudson River.

As part of the third stage of his work, Randel intended to create an extremely large map of the city, at an unprecedented scale. This has been a part of the agreement between Randel and the Common Council in 1812, but had been forgotten by all except Randel. Somewhat peeved to be reminded of it six years later, the council nonetheless honored the contract, and officially commissioned Randel to make his map. This was done by way of 32 inches (81 cm) by 20 inches (51 cm) colored "Farm Maps" made at a scale of one hundred feet per inch (1.2 m/mm) that overlaid Manhattan's natural topography with the intended grid. When put together, the Farm Maps made a map of the city about 50 feet (15 m) long. It took Randel and his wife Matilda two years, from 1819 to 1820, to finish the maps, working from their new home, having moved to Orange, New Jersey. He needed, asked for, and received an extension from the Common Council to complete the task, and even then he did not quite make the deadline, delivering the last maps in September 1820, about four months late.

Randel's Farm Maps are justly praised for their accuracy and usefulness. Historian Isaac Newton Phelps Stokes, in his The Iconography of Manhattan Island, 1498–1909 called them "the most complete and valuable topographical record of the period that exists. It is, in fact, the only early topographical record of the island."

The Farm Maps also make clear why so many property owners were distraught about the coming of the grid, and why some of them tried to stop Randel and his crew from completing their work. The maps are replete with houses that are directly in the way of where streets were scheduled to run, and lots that would be bisected, trisected, or completely obliterated by the streets and avenues of the new grid. It is no wonder why people fought back against the Commissioners' Plan, or set their dogs on Randel and his men.

As well as the Farm Maps, Randel produced an atlas of the city, filling in with "astounding precision" the details of street locations and elevations which had been left off the official map.

==== "Opening" and "working" the streets ====
The process of creating one of the streets gridded on the Commissioners' map was two-fold. First, the city had to acquire the land, compensating the owner for doing so. This was called "opening" the street. This was followed by "working" the street, which consisted of regulating, grading, and paving it. Most of the cost of this was passed on to property owners by way of assessments.

The process began when the Street Commissioner recommended to the Common Council that a certain street, or part of a street, be opened, and the Council would ask the New York State Supreme Court to appoint a Commission of Estimate and Assessment, as described below.

===== Opening =====
With the grid inscribed on the landscape with markers and pegs, the actual streets had to be "opened", and they also had to be paid for. The city had no great reserve of money, and no regular income stream, so they developed a mechanism to pay for the opening and building of the streets, and for compensating the landowners whose property would be used for them. The 1807 law had specified that the city would calculate damages to the landowners' property as well as assess the benefits the landowners would receive from the new streets. Any disagreement between the parties could then be appealed to the state supreme court. Unfortunately, such a system would not be sufficient for the number of streets and avenues called for by the Commissioners' Plan, so the Common Council approached the state legislature with a new one, which they approved in a new law in April 1813.

In the new system, the state supreme court would appoint three "commissioners of appraisal and estimate" for the street to be opened – generally local surveyors or other people familiar with the area the street would pass through – to evaluate the cost of the land being taken, and the beneficial value of the new street to the landowner. The appraisal commission could assess the city with as much as a third of the cost of the opening – raised to 50% in 1869 – and the remainder of the cost would come from the difference between the beneficial value and the value of the property. The supreme court would then review the figures and ask for revisions or approve them. The result was "binding and conclusive."

===== Working =====
Once the street was legally "opened" with the approval by the court of the commission's figures, the city collected the assessment from the landowners along the street, and once the assessment was totally collected, the streets could be built, or "worked". The land was cleared, hills were excavated or hollows filled in, the right of way was leveled and the street was paved. Many years could pass between when a street was "opened" and when it finally began to resemble a city street, having been cleared, leveled, graded and paved. The grading was often difficult because of the rocky nature of the island, especially on the West Side. In 1843, Isaacher Cozzens described the ground as "a tough cement of clay, gravel, and boulders, very hard to dig. In digging through 42nd Street, the pickaxes had to be used for every shovelful of this clayey cement which formed what is called, a hard-pan, of about fourteen feet or more."

The decision on what the elevation of the street would be fell to the Common Council, as the commission for each street was disbanded once the street had been opened. The Council was aggressive in administering the street plan, even causing John Jacob Astor to back down when he challenged their decisions.

Of course, the new system did not stop landowners from appealing the assessments made by the streets commissions – generally speaking, landowners who had inherited their property were more inclined to appeal assessments than were land speculators, who simply paid the assessments and waited for the values of their properties to rise, as they inevitably did. The outcomes of the landowner appeals, together with those of the lawsuits against the plan which had been filed as early as 1810, created a body of precedents by which the state law was administered. Most of the appeals failed, in particular those that claimed that the Plan was an unlawful taking of property, since eminent domain was a well-established principle of law, although its use on such an extensive basis in New York City was new.

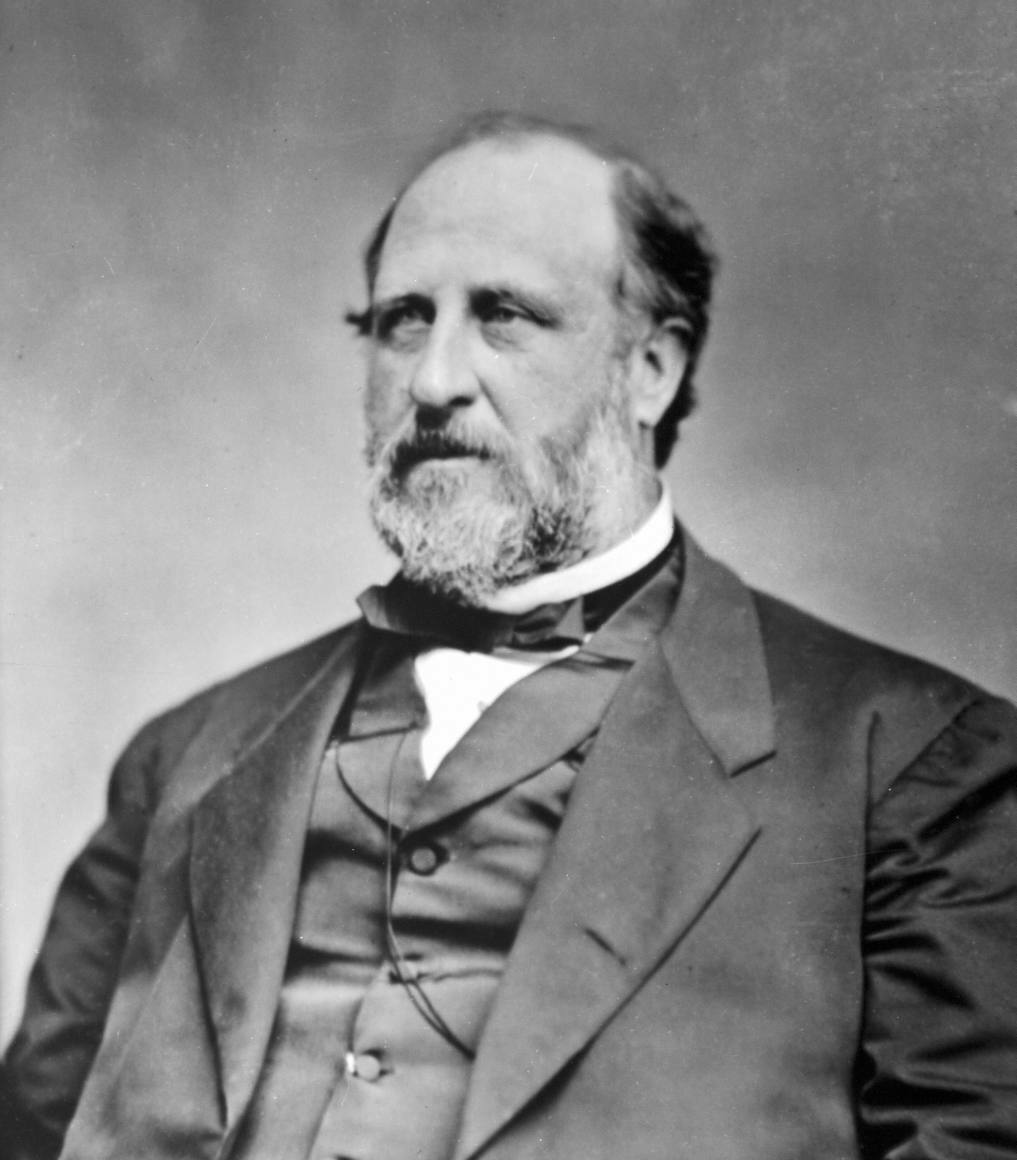
William M. "Boss" Tweed (1870)

===== "Boss" Tweed ups the ante =====
Because of the inequities of the street opening and regulating system, in which property owners were assessed multiple times, and it could take years for just a few blocks to be completed, and because of increasing corruption once Tammany Hall came into power, the state legislature changed the system in 1869. In the new arrangement, the city could pay for 50% of the cost of building streets above 14th Street, and up to 100% below that line, through general tax revenues. This new system was very long-lived: it remained in effect until 1961, when a new city charter came into effect.

Tammany Hall took the new system in its stride, as it pushed a new city charter through the Tammany-controlled legislature in 1870. The new charter invested most of the city's power in the Board of Apportionment, consisting of the mayor, the comptroller, the commissioner of parks and the commissioner of public works, who were, of course, all Tammany men loyal to William M. "Boss" Tweed. These same men, with slight variations, were also the Board of Supervisors, the Board of Audit, and the Board of Street Openings, creating vast new opportunities for graft and corruption. Tweed himself was the head of the Department of Public Works, and controlled when and where the grid would be activated. The pace of the expansion of the grid picked up tremendously, but so did the money going into Tweed's pockets, as Tweed invested in land and then increased its value by opening streets in the areas he had invested in. Tweed's investments were all over the city, but especially on the East Side. Tweed was eventually tried and jailed, but in his wake he left a city whose development had pushed ahead of its previous sluggish pace, as well as a city raked with debt, since rather than raise taxes for the public works he ordered, the city borrowed money on a massive scale, doubling its debt load in just two years, from $36 million in January 1869 to $73 million.

Overall, it took approximately 60 years for the grid to be implemented all the way to 155th Street.

==== The topography of Manhattan ====
A frequent charge laid by the critics of the Commissioners' Plan is that the excavation and leveling necessary to implement it basically destroyed the topography of Manhattan. Recent studies, however, have shown that while the topography of the island certainly changed, what exists now is not so very different from the original topography as the critics would suggest.

Reuben Rose-Redwood and Li Li compared Randel's elevation data to modern data and found that while there had been some leveling – in general the West Side had been smoothed out and the East Side had been filled in – the overall average change was low. Rose-Redwood commented: "[T]he majority of the alterations were only on the order of a few meters or less, and the historical profiles of Manhattan's avenues are very similar to the contemporary transects of those same thoroughfares." Infilling led to an average increase of 9 feet (2.7 m) and excavation to an average decrease of 12 feet (3.7 m), but the West Side remains hillier than the East Side, just as was the case before the grid. Rose-Redwood writes that "Manhattan remains an 'island of hills' ..."

== Modifications and extensions ==
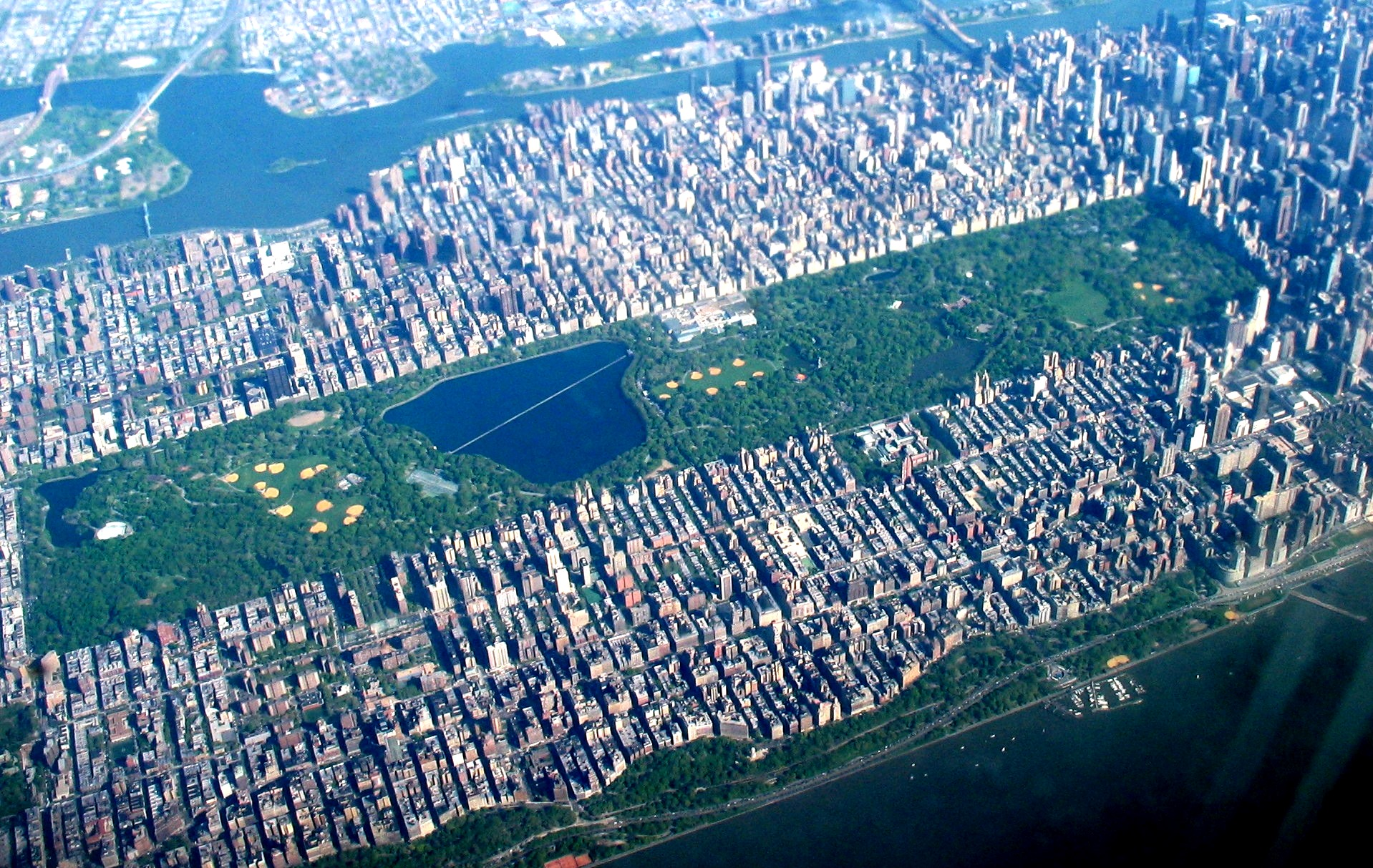
Central Park is by far the largest interruption of the Commissioners' grid, running from Central Park South (59th Street, at the right) to 110th Street (on the left), and from Fifth Avenue (at the top) to Central Park West (Eighth Avenue, at the bottom), and at 843 acres (341 ha), taking up a little over 6% of the area of Manhattan island.

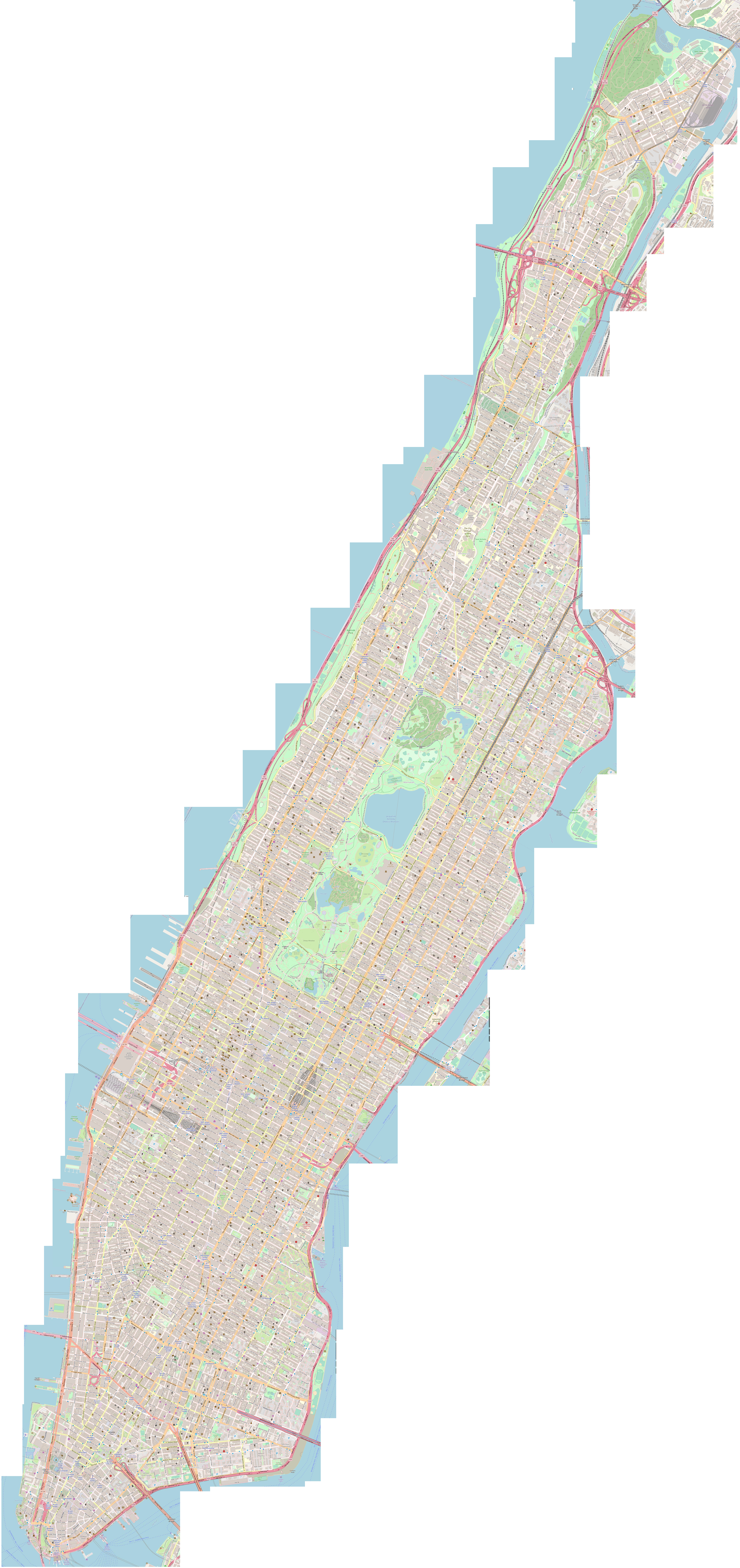
Map of Manhattan in 2023. Despite many changes, the most notable being the addition of Central Park and the removal of the Grand Parade, the grid from Commissioners' Plan of 1811 is still clearly visible.

By 1865, Andrew Haswell Green reported, there had been 38 separate state laws passed which modified the original grid of 1811.

=== Central Park and other alterations ===
By far the largest alteration to the Commissioners' Plan was the creation of the 843-acre (341 ha) Central Park between 59th and 110th Streets and Fifth and Eighth Avenues.

The concept of the park first came up for public discussion in the 1840s. By and large its advocates were wealthy landowners and merchants, who argued that New York lacked the kind of parks that graced cities such as London and Paris, and that the creation of such a park would enhance New York's reputation as an international city. With the population of the city growing, there was an intense need for public spaces, which the Commissioners' Plan had been notoriously short on providing for. In 1853, the state legislature authorized the city to use eminent domain to acquire the necessary land. Four years later it appointed a Central Park Commission, led by Andrew Haswell Green, to build the park. The commission held a design contest, which was won by Frederick Law Olmsted and Calvert Vaux's "Greensward Plan". Construction started in 1857, and in 1863 the northern boundary was moved from 106th Street, where it had originally been set, to 110th Street. In 1870 the park passed from state control to local control when a new city charter came into effect. The park was completed by 1876.

Significant to the Commissioners' Plan of 1811 was that Green was an outspoken critic of the grid. In 1867, he convinced the state legislature to give his Central Park Commission the power to make changes in the grid above 59th Street. However, even though few streets in that area had been laid out yet, property lines conformed to the grid, making sweeping changes to it difficult to achieve. Green was able to take advantage of a high ridge and create Morningside Park and Morningside Drive, and also created Riverside Park along the Hudson River; both parks were designed by Olmsted and Vaux. Green also laid out a broad Boulevard – now Broadway – up the center of the West Side.

Because a formal planning commission in support of the Commissioners' Plan was not created, there was no authority outside of the Common Council to protect its integrity. Thus the elimination of the Grand Parade and the wholesale marketplace and the addition of Union, Tompkins, Stuyvesant and Madison Squares came about, as well as the already noted additions of Lexington and Madison Avenues. Fourth and Sixth Avenues were extended downtown, and Broadway uptown.

Other interruptions of the 1811 plan include college campuses (Columbia University, City College of New York, Fordham University at Lincoln Center), parks (Marcus Garvey Park, St. Nicholas Park; Jackie Robinson Park), hospitals (Mount Sinai Hospital, Metropolitan Hospital, Columbia University Medical Center), churches (the Cathedral of St. John the Divine, Trinity Cemetery and the Church of the Intercession), numerous New York City Housing Authority housing projects, as well as other housing complexes (Stuyvesant Town–Peter Cooper Village, Penn South, Lincoln Towers), cultural institutions (Lincoln Center), American Museum of Natural History, office complexes (Rockefeller Center), and transportation (Grand Central Terminal, Pennsylvania Station), convention (Jacob K. Javits Center), and sports (Madison Square Garden) facilities.

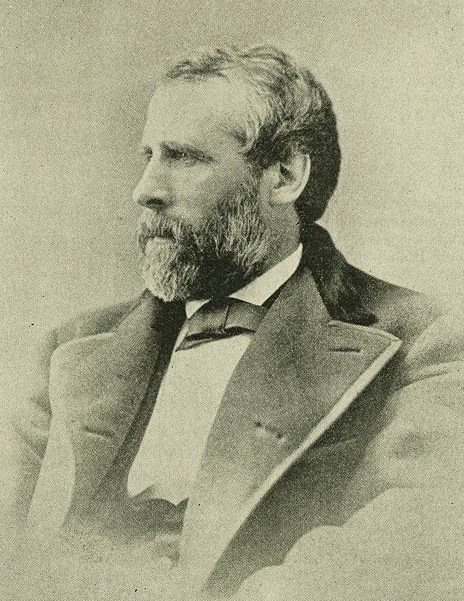
Andrew Haswell Green, a critic of the Commissioners' Plan, headed the Central Park Commission, which created the street plan for Manhattan above 155th Street

=== Above 155th Street ===
The Commissioners' Plan of 1811 stopped at 155th Street – except for 10th Avenue which was extended to the northern tip of the island – but as the city grew, and subsumed what had been independent villages such as Greenwich Village and Manhattanville, it became clear that a plan of action would be needed for the part of Manhattan above that line. The Common Council directed the city's street commissioner to develop a plan for Upper Manhattan in 1851, but no money was allocated for the task, so there was no result. In any case, any street plan for that area would have had a difficult time in extending the simple rectilinear grid created by the Commissioners for the area below 155th Street, because the topography of Upper Manhattan was significantly more difficult to tame, consisting as it does of extremely steep hills, high ridges made of hard Manhattan schist, and deep valleys caused by tectonic fault lines at what is now Dyckman Street, which transects the Fort Washington Ridge; 155th Street; and at 125th Street, which crosses the Manhattan Ridge to create the Manhattanville Valley.

Even before the publication of the Commissioners' Plan, the Common Council had agreed with the founder of Manhattanville, Jacob Schieffelin, to grade and pave that community's main road, Manhattan Street, which was part of a grid which was rotated significantly farther to the east than the Commissioners' grid would have put it. When push came to shove, and the question of whether the street they had paid a contractor $600 to create should be demapped and uncreated, the Council decided instead to keep the street, and in 1849 it was officially connected to the western portion of 125th Street. It remains today, with its original bend. One other Manhattanville street was also kept, which became the western portion of 126th Street.

With the need for a street plan for Upper Manhattan, in 1860 the state legislature created another commission, this one of seven residents of Upper Manhattan and called the Fort Washington Commission – with Olmsted and Vaux as consulting landscape architects – to come up with a plan of action which would not be a copy of the grid plan promulgated by the original Commission. The new plan was to take into account "the elevated, irregular, and rocky formation of that district" because it would be "impracticable and ruinous to land owners, and injurious to the interests of the city, to grade and layout streets and avenues ... upon the present plan of the city." However, due to the influence of businesses, land speculators and railroad interests, the plan created by the new commission in 1863 essentially called for an extension of the original grid, and by 1865 the legislature had disbanded the commission, and turned over responsibility for an Upper Manhattan street plan to Andrew Haswell Green's Central Park Commission.

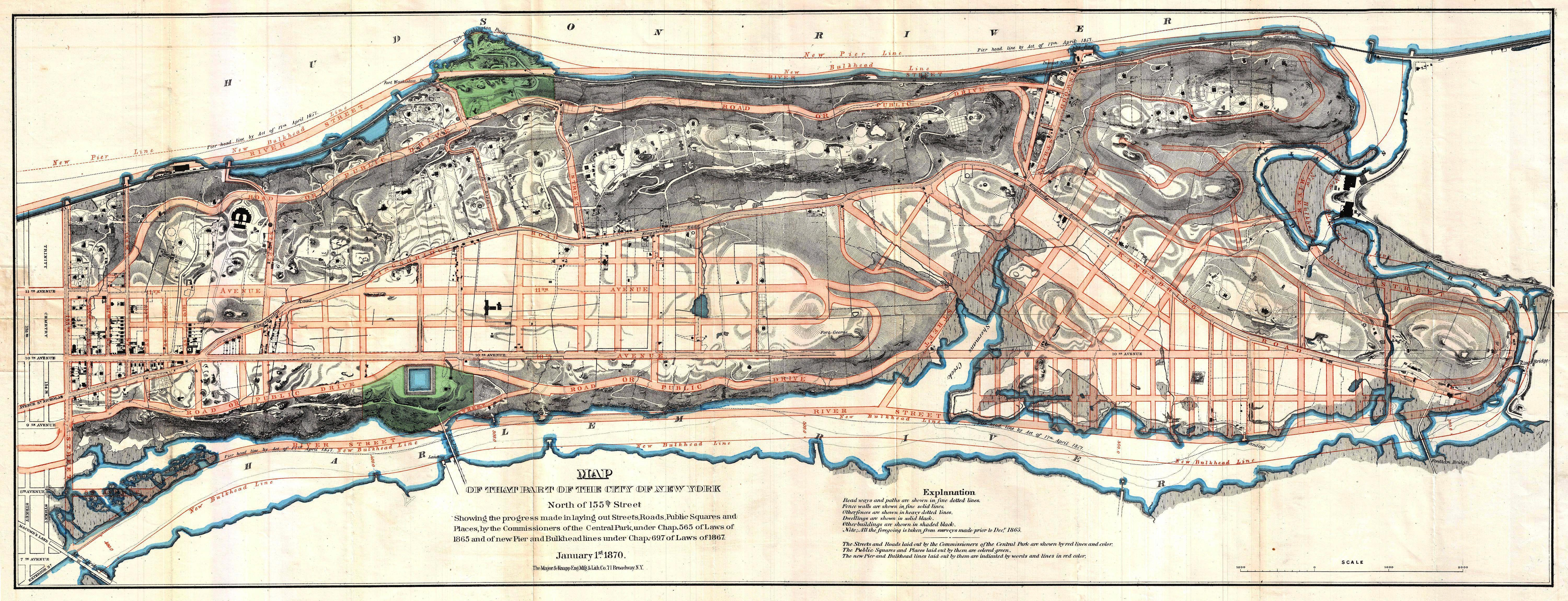
The Knapp map of 1870 shows the progress made in laying out streets above 155th Street as called for in the Central Park Commission's 1868 plan

The commission did extensive due diligence on the area, studying property ownership, population density, sanitation, the jobs of the residents, food and supplies distribution patterns, defensive needs, even the winds and weather of the region, and in 1868, a plan was published which called for grids in the valleys, but also streets, avenues and parks which conformed to the topography of the land. Green said about the results of his commission's plan that it created "the only portion of Manhattan Island where any trace of its pristine beauty remains undesecrated and unrased [sic] by the leveling march of so-called 'public improvements.'"

Several other avenues were added to the grid when Upper Manhattan was developed, such as Riverside Drive, Claremont Avenue, and Saint Nicholas Avenue. The old Bloomingdale Road and Broadway – which are pictured on the original 1811 map, but which were not part of the original planned grid – were eventually combined together as Broadway was extended northward; it also took in part of the Kingsbridge Road in upper Manhattan.

Upper Manhattan did not develop exactly as Green and the Central Park Commission envisioned, but its difference from the grid of the Commissioners' Plan is still clear.

=== The Bronx ===
As New York City grew north into the Bronx at the end of the 19th century, the numbering scheme was extended into the Bronx, albeit haphazardly. The development of the town of Morrisania in the 1850s saw the first instance of the gridiron spreading beyond the island of Manhattan, extending the grid through what is now Mott Haven to at least 147th Street. By 1879, the numbering had extended through the former towns of Morrisania and West Farms (having been absorbed into New York County), extending to 189th Street. By 1909, the grid had extended to the northern border of the Bronx, ending at 263rd Street in North Riverdale. However, the extension of the grid was not uniform. East of Riverdale, the grid was an expansion of Mott Haven's extension of the grid. This was done without conforming to Manhattan's spacing of streets, opting for greater space between them, and in the case of Morrisania and Wakefield, using existing street systems; thus the system terminates at the city's north line at 243rd Street. Meanwhile, the system in Riverdale was extended from Manhattan's extension of the grid north of 155th St, resulting in twenty street numbers more than the rest of the Bronx. The farthest east the numbering scheme goes is Eastchester, where 233rd St terminates. The only avenue to extend into the Bronx is Third Avenue, reaching into Belmont.

=== Avenues and streets ===
For the most part, with the exception of the streets which were displaced by Central Park, the east–west streets of the Commissioners' Plan – which did not, by design, include Greenwich Village – have remained as they were originally drawn and numbered. As mentioned above, the western ends of 125th and 126th Streets are another exception, as are some streets around the parks which developed, such as Central Park South. Of course, various streets have been blocked from continuing straight through from one side of the island to the other by parks, apartment complexes, college campuses, and so on, but, in general, the east–west part of the grid is intact.

One proposal for a change was made in 1915 by Thomas Kennard Thomson, an engineer from Buffalo, New York who settled in New York City after making a career in Canada and the United States as a bridge and railway engineer. Thompson opened an office in New York in 1893 which concentrated on the foundations of skyscrapers and underwater caissons used for building bridges. He was involved in the construction of the Singer Tower, the Manhattan Municipal Building and the Mutual Life Building. His 1915 plan was aimed at relieving congestion at the intersection of Fifth Avenue and 42nd Street. Thompson proposed to run 42nd Street under Fifth Avenue, and to add a mid-block street between Fifth and Sixth Avenues from 42nd to 43rd Streets to permit the turns that the tunneling would prevent. Why this plan would not simply shift the congestion to the new mid-block connector is not clear. In modern actions to relieve congestion, changes are generally made within the existing right-of-way, therefore without the need to condemn and purchase very expensive Manhattan property.

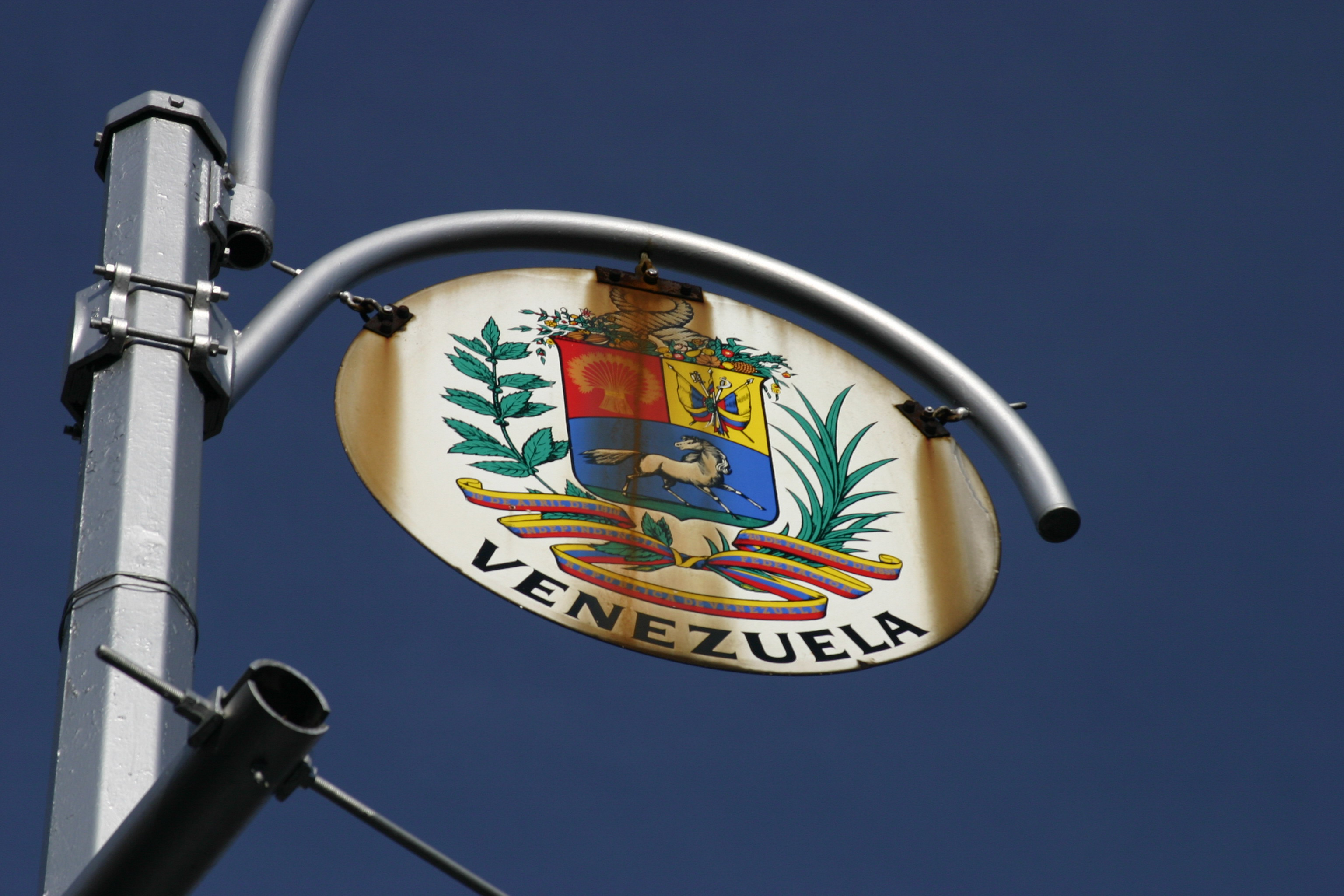
In 1945, Sixth Avenue was officially renamed "Avenue of the Americas", and was adorned with circular signs for each member country of the Organization of American States, such as this one for Venezuela. The name never caught on with New Yorkers, though, who still insist on calling it "Sixth Avenue". After decades of requiring only one official name, the city at last began to co-sign the avenue with both names. Currently, "Avenue of the Americas" is generally only seen on business stationery and official city documents, or heard from the mouths of tourists.

As opposed to the east–west streets, the north–south avenues have undergone some significant changes. They have, for one thing, increased in number, and many of them have been re-named over the years.

In the 1830s and 40s, two additional avenues were interpolated between the original avenues, largely due to the influence of real estate speculator Samuel B. Ruggles: Lexington Avenue, known south of 20th Street as Irving Place, was built between Fourth and Third Avenues to service Ruggles' Gramercy Park development, and Madison Avenue was built between Fourth and Fifth Avenues. Another interpolated avenue, between Fifth and Sixth Avenues from 14th Street to Central Park, was proposed in 1910 by Mayor William Jay Gaynor, who put great effort into promoting it. (Note: An illustration of Gaynor's proposed avenue, published in The New York Times on May 29, 1910, can be seen in Ballon, p. 125) The plan died, however, when Gaynor was shot by an outraged landowner whose property would be taken for the new road. Gaynor survived, but was not able to put the necessary energy into his proposal, and it faded away. These interpolations were felt necessary because, essentially, the Commissioners had left gaps between Third and Fourth, Fourth and Fifth, and Fifth and Sixth that were too large to allow sufficient real estate development.

Of the Commissioners' original avenues, only First, Second, Third, and Fifth Avenues and Avenues C and D have never been renamed, though some of the named avenues, such as Avenue of the Americas (Sixth), are also known by their numbers.

- Fourth Avenue: Union Square East (14th–17th Streets), Park Avenue South (17th–32nd Streets), Park Avenue (32nd–135th Streets; as of 1888)
- Sixth Avenue: Avenue of the Americas (co-named, to Central Park South), Lenox Avenue/Malcolm X Boulevard (co-named, 110th–147th Street)
- Seventh Avenue: Adam Clayton Powell Jr. Boulevard (110th–153rd Street)
- Eighth Avenue: Central Park West (Columbus Circle to Frederick Douglass Circle; as of 1883), Frederick Douglass Boulevard (Frederick Douglass Circle to Harlem River Drive at 154th Street)
- Ninth Avenue: Columbus Avenue (59th–110th Streets; as of 1890)
- Tenth Avenue: Amsterdam Avenue (59th Street to Fort George Avenue at about 193rd Street; as of 1890)
- Eleventh Avenue: West Side Highway (14th–22nd Streets); West End Avenue (59th–107th Streets; as of 1880)
- Twelfth Avenue: West Side Highway (22nd–59th Streets)

Over the years, portions of Avenue A were renamed Sutton Place in Midtown Manhattan, York Avenue on the Upper East Side and Pleasant Avenue in East Harlem. Portions of Avenue B were also renamed East End Avenue in Yorkville.

Portions of the lettered avenues north of 14th Street were lost in the development of Stuyvesant Town–Peter Cooper Village after World War II. As late as 1943, Avenue A went as far north as 25th Street, Avenue B ended at 21st Street and Avenue C reached 18th Street.

=== Broadway ===
Broadway, which was the main north–south artery of the colonial city, originally ended at 10th Street, where it merged with the Bloomingdale Road, which then wandered up to approximately 147th Street, where it turned into the Kingsbridge Road. The combined streets took a fairly haphazard path as they made their way uptown. The Commissioners' Plan retained Broadway and Bloomingdale Road up to 23rd Street, with the intention that the uptown sections would be demapped. However, Bloomingdale Road as far as 43rd Street was officially restored in 1838, up to 71st Street in 1847, then in 1851 to 86th Street, with each section being straightened, often in parallel to the grid, as it was restored. In 1865, it was restored all the way to Spuyten Duyvil Creek, the top of Manhattan. The section below 59th Street was called Broadway, but Andrew Haswell Green called the section from 59th to 108th Street "The Boulevard". Finally in 1899, the entire road was named Broadway, and the other names, not only Bloomingdale Road, The Boulevard, and Kingsbridge Road, but also Middle Road, Old Harlem Road and the East Post Road all disappeared. In modern New York City, Broadway, along with the avenues and the major cross-streets, is considered to be one of the major arterial roads.

The angled course of Broadway below 59th Street creates Herald, Times, Madison and Union Squares. Architect Rafael Viñoly refers to these unplanned intersections as "happy accidents".

== Reaction ==
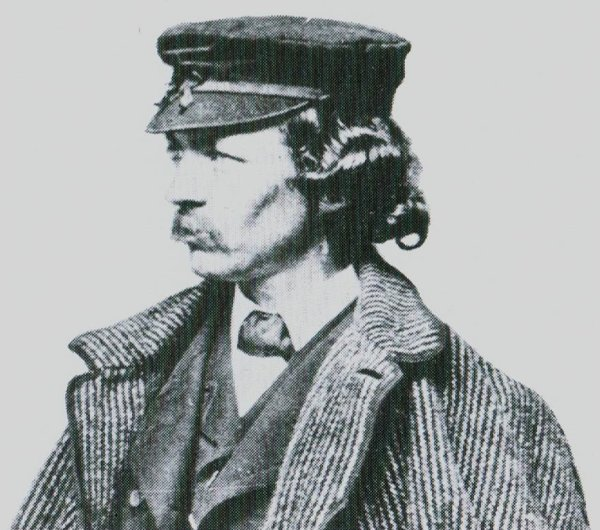
Frederick Law Olmsted, vociferous critic of the Commissioners' Plan (c.1860)

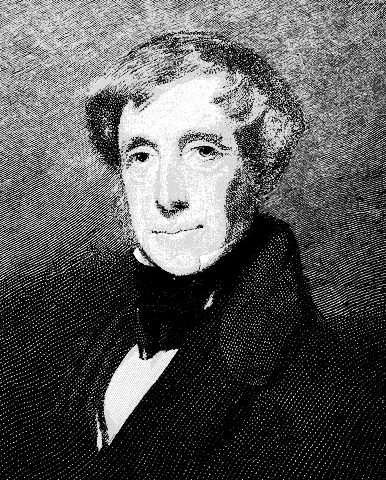
Clement Clarke Moore objected to the Plan, but made a fortune developing his estate once the Plan's streets were laid down through it. (1897)

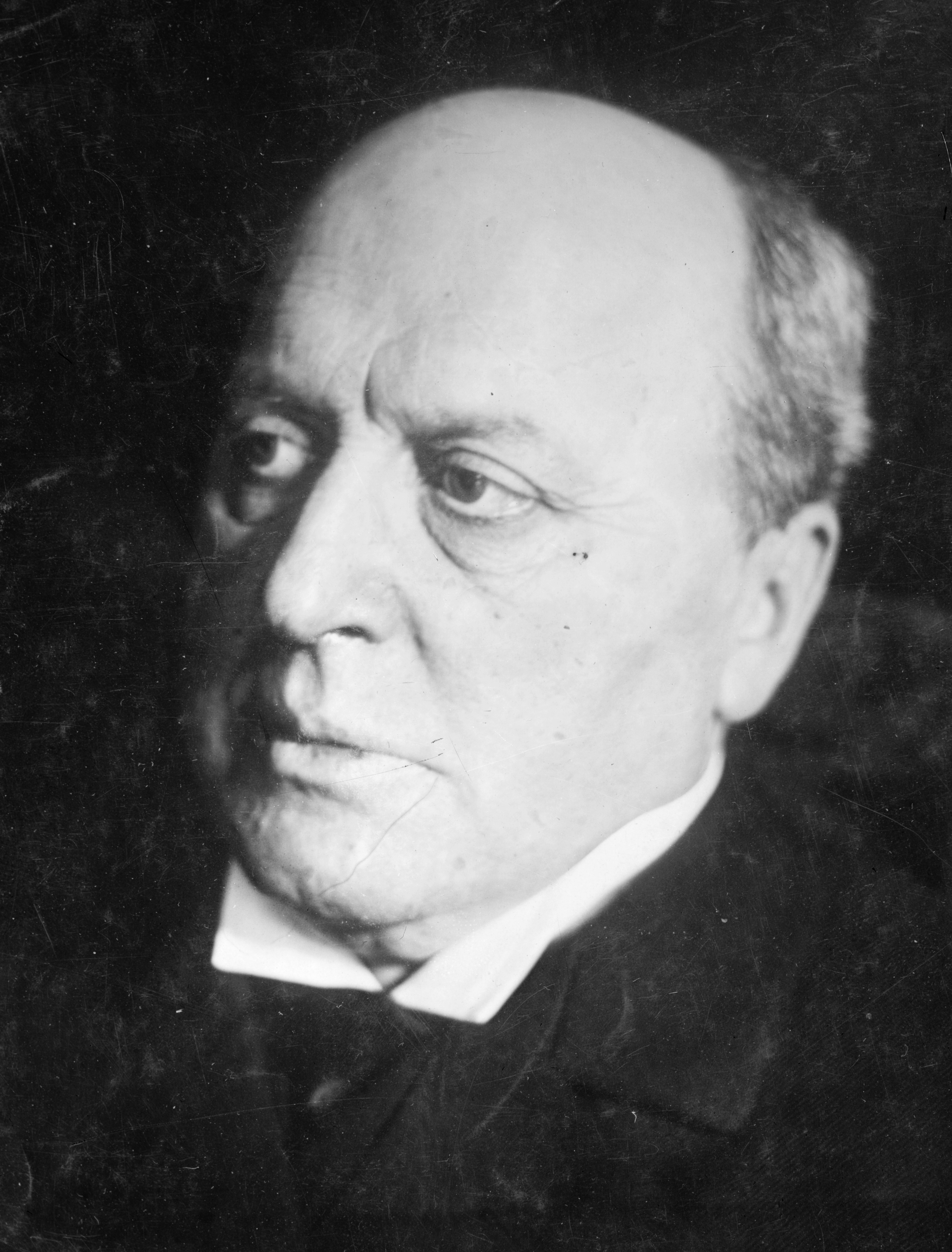
Henry James (1910)

Lewis Mumford, a vehement critic of the Commissioners' Plan

=== Criticism ===
The plan was also vociferously criticized from the start, not least because it did not take into account the natural topography of the island, but also because it took no notice of classical ideas about beauty, and was monotonous in its regularity. It was also lambasted for being made in service of monetary interests alone. Among the many critics of the plan were Edgar Allan Poe and Alexis de Tocqueville who believed that it fostered "relentless monotony". Walt Whitman, the poet and editor of The Brooklyn Eagle, said of it: "Our perpetual dead flat and streets cutting each other at right angles, are certainly the last thing in the world consistent with beauty of situation."

Frederick Law Olmsted, who would co-design Central Park, and has been called "the grid's most significant nineteenth-century critic", facetiously said of the grid's origin:

There seems to be good authority for the story that the system of 1807 was hit upon by the chance occurrence of a mason's sieve near the map of the ground to be laid out. It was taken up and placed upon the map, and the question being asked "what do you want better than that?", no one was able to answer. This may not be the whole story of the plan, but the result is the same as if it were.

Olmsted also said of it in 1858:

The time will come when New York will be built-up, when all the grading and filling will be done, when the picturesquely varied rock formations of the island will have been converted into the foundations for rows of monotonous straight streets, and piles of erect angular buildings. There will be no suggestion left of its present varied surface, with the single except of the few acres contained in [Central] Park.

Olmsted was clearly no fan of the grid plan: "The great disadvantage under which New-York [sic] labors is one growing out of the senseless manner in which its streets have been laid out. No city is more unfortunately planned with reference to metropolitan attractiveness." Still, by 1876, even Olmsted had to admit that the grid had prevailed.

In 1818, Clement Clarke Moore, the author of A Visit from St. Nicholas – probably better known as "Twas the Night Before Christmas" – whose estate "Chelsea" would be chopped up by the plan, wrote in "A Plain Statement, addressed to the Proprietors of Real Estate, in the City and County of New York" :

The great principle which governs these plans is, to reduce the surface of the earth as nearly as possible to dead level. ... The natural inequities of the ground are destroyed, and the existing water courses disregarded. ... These are men who would have cut down the seven hills of Rome. We live under a tyranny with respects to the rights of property, which ... no monarch in Europe would dare to exercise ... it is a tyranny of the worst kind; for it is under the sanction of laws which shield those who exercise it from being called to legal account. It is time for all who are interested to arouse, and to unite themselves for the maintenance and preservation of their rights.

Moore signed his pamphlet as "A Landowner", but it was not long before his identity was exposed. Despite these vehement objections and his call to arms, Moore later made a great deal of money by sub-dividing his estate and developing it section-by-section along the gridded streets. Ironically, it was the landowners like Moore, who fought the grid most insistently, who made the most money from exploiting it.

Edith Wharton bemoaned "... rectangular New York ... this cramped horizontal gridiron of a town without towers, porticoes, fountains or perspectives, hide-bound in its deadly uniformity of mean ugliness," while her friend Henry James wrote that:

New York pays the penalty of her primal topographic curse, her old inconceivably bourgeois scheme of composition and distribution, the uncollected labor of minds with no imagination of the future and blind before the opportunity given them by their two magnificent water-fronts. This original sin of the longitudinal avenues perpetually, yet meanly intersected, and of the organized sacrifice of the indicated alternative, the great perspectives from East to West, might still have earned forgiveness by some occasional departure from its pettifogging consistency. But, thanks to this consistence, the city is, of all great cities, the least endowed with any blest [sic] item of stately square or goodly garden, with any happy accident of surprise, any fortunate nook or casual corner, any deviation, in fine, into the liberal or charming. That way, however, for the regenerate filial mind, madness may be said to lie – the way of imagining what might have been and putting it all together in the light of what so helplessly is.

Architect Julius Harder wrote in 1898 in The City's Plan:

The street plan ... had only the dubious merit of the most childish regularity and of devoting the maximum proportion of area to building sites. Every consideration of economy of intercommunication, future financial economy, sanitation, healthfulness and aesthetics was absolutely left out of the reckoning.

Historian and architect Isaac Newton Phelps Stokes wrote in The Iconography of Manhattan Island, 1498–1909, recounting the city's history, that in 1811:

We have now reached the point where the old city, which had grown up haphazard, with crooked streets, wooded hills, and fertile valleys traversed by streams and winding country roads, begins to be absorbed into a new city, in which antiquity and nature are no longer respected, with streets laid out in accordance with a carefully considered symmetrical plan. ... Unfortunately, this plan, although possessing the merits of simplicity and directness, lacked entirely the equally essential elements of variety of picturesqueness, which demand a large degree of respect for the natural conformation of the land. The new plan was entirely deficient in sentiment and charm, and with its gradual development, little by little, the individuality, the interest, and the beauty of one choice spot after another have been swept away [until] scarcely anything remains to remind us of the primitive beauty and the fascinating diversity of natural charms we know Manhattan once possessed. The year 1811 marks the end of the little old city and the beginning of the great modern metropolis.

Noted architecture critic Lewis Mumford, a vehement protester against the plan, complained about the "blank imbecility" of this "civic folly" with its "long monotonous streets that terminated nowhere, filled by rows of monotonous houses." He wrote in The City in History (1961): "Such plans fitted nothing but a quick parcelling of the land, a quick conversion of farmsteads into real estate, and a quick sale." Thirty years earlier, in "The Plan of the City", published in The New Republic in 1932, he called the grid plan "a straight-jacket from which [New York City] has not escaped, from which perhaps it can never escape."

Urban activist Jane Jacobs noted "street[s] that go on and on ... dribbling into endless amorphous repetitions ... and finally petering into the utter anonymity of distances," and famed architect Frank Lloyd Wright wrote of its "deadly monotony," calling it a "man trap of gigantic dimensions."

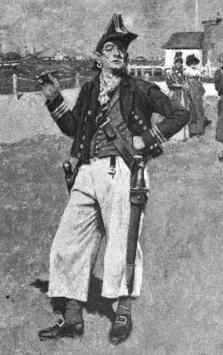
Thomas Janvier, an illustration from In Old New York (1894)

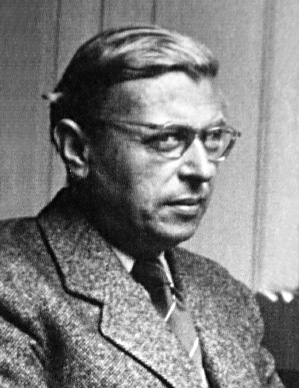
Jean-Paul Sartre (c.1950)

As seen from the vilification in Moore's and James' comments quoted above, the Commissioners came in for as much criticism as the grid itself. Mumford wrote that: "With a T-square and a triangle, finally, the municipal engineer, without the slightest training as either an architect or a sociologist, could "plan" a metropolis ..." and Montgomery Schuyler, another architecture critic, claimed that "We all agreed – all of us, that is, who pay attention to such things – that the Commissioners were public malefactors of high degree." Jean Schopfer, writing in The Architectural Record in 1902, said of them "Men of genius were needed ... Unhappily, they were ... men devoid of all imagination," while historian Thomas Janvier, in his book In Old New York (1894), wrote of the "deplorable results" of "the excellently dull gentlemen", and criticized the plan as only "a grind of money-making." He wrote about it that the Commissioners

decided that the forests should be cut away, the hills levelled [sic], the hollows filled in, the streams buried; and upon the flat surface thus created they clamped down a ruler and completed their Bœotian ... programme by creating a city in which all was right angles and straight lines.

Further,

Unfortunately, the promise of this far-sighted undertaking was far from being fulfilled in its performance. The magnificent opportunity which was given to the Commissioners to create a beautiful city simply was wasted and thrown away. ... Thinking only of utility and economy ... in the simplest and dullest way ... their Plan fell so far short of what might have been accomplished by men of genius governed by artistic taste. ... [T]hey were surcharged with the dullness and intense utilitarianism of the people and the period of which they were a part.

French philosopher Jean-Paul Sartre wrote about New York City in both French and English. He learned to love the city, but also wrote that "in this immense, malevolent space, in this desert of rock that brooks no vegetation" he felt lost. "Amid the numerical anonymity of streets and avenues, I am simply anyone, anywhere, since one place is so like another. I am never astray, but always lost." His one essay on New York in English, originally published in Town & Country in May 1946, was republished as "New York, Colonial City," but the original title was "Manhattan: The Great American Desert."

Modern urban analysts often have negative comments about the grid, from Vincent Scully's calling it an "implacable gridiron" to the comment of Richard Pluz, an historian of housing, that "Even in 1811, the gridiron did not work well." Urban planner Peter Marcuse wrote that it was "generally taken to be one of the worst city plans of any major city in the developed countries of the world."

Urban historian John W. Reps, in his The Making of Urban America of 1965, wrote of the grid:

The unfortunate results of the prejudices and mistakes of the planners of 1811 are well known today. The lack of suitable sites for public buildings, the traffic congestion at the frequent intersections, the lack of enough north–south arteries, the overbuilding on narrow lots that inevitably resulted from the shallow blocks – these are but a few of the shortcomings. But even by the standards of the early nineteenth century the plan was inadequate. In an effort to escape criticism on the grounds of economy and practicality, the commissioners ignored well-known principles of civic design that would have brought variety in street vistas and resulted in focal points for sites for important buildings and use. True enough, no one would have foreseen the rapid growth of the city and the changes in transportation and population that lessened the importance of the river-to-river cross streets while placing an intolerable load on the less numerous north–south avenues. But one cannot avoid the conclusion that the commissioners, in fixing upon their plan, were motivated mainly by narrow consideration of economic gain. Their surveyor, Randel, was later to defend the plan by steadfastly maintaining its utility for the "buying, selling and improving of real estate." As an aid to speculation the commissioners' plan was perhaps unequalled, but only on this ground can it justifiably be called a great achievement.

Reps also wrote that "The fact that it was the gridiron New York that served as a model for later cities was a disaster whose consequences have barely been mitigated by more modern city planners."

In his book, City on a Grid: How New York Became New York, historian Gerard Koeppel says of the Commissioners' Plan that it was "simply not something that had been deeply thought out," and quotes a student of the plan as saying that it was "a quick solution to a difficult problem" made by "apathetic authors, who simply overlaid Manhattan with eight miles of uncompromising grid."

=== Praise ===
From its inception, there have been those who sang the praises of the Commissioners' gridiron plan. Writing in 1986, urban analyst David Schuyler said that "In 1811 the gridiron had been so widely accepted as the optimal street arrangement for a commercial city that the plan received only perfunctory treatment in the press – even though it had a dramatic effect on existing property lines."

The Citizens and Strangers Guide of 1814 said "The whole island has been surveyed and framed into extensive avenues and commodious streets, forming an important legacy to posterity, from which the most solid advantages may be anticipated," while another commentator from that year wrote "The arrangement of the original or lower part of the city ... is essentially defective. Beauty order and convenience seem to have been little valued by our ancestors." This comment is especially interesting, considering that so many of the critics of the plan would cite its lack of beauty as a reason for their displeasure with it. One critic recently pointed out that the wide avenues attract retail and commercial use, among other benefits. In 1836, an official in the city government wrote that the Plan "... laid out the highways on the island upon so magnificent a scale, and with so bold a hand, and with such prophetic views, in respect to the future growth and extension of the city, that it will form an everlasting monument to the stability and wisdom of the measure."

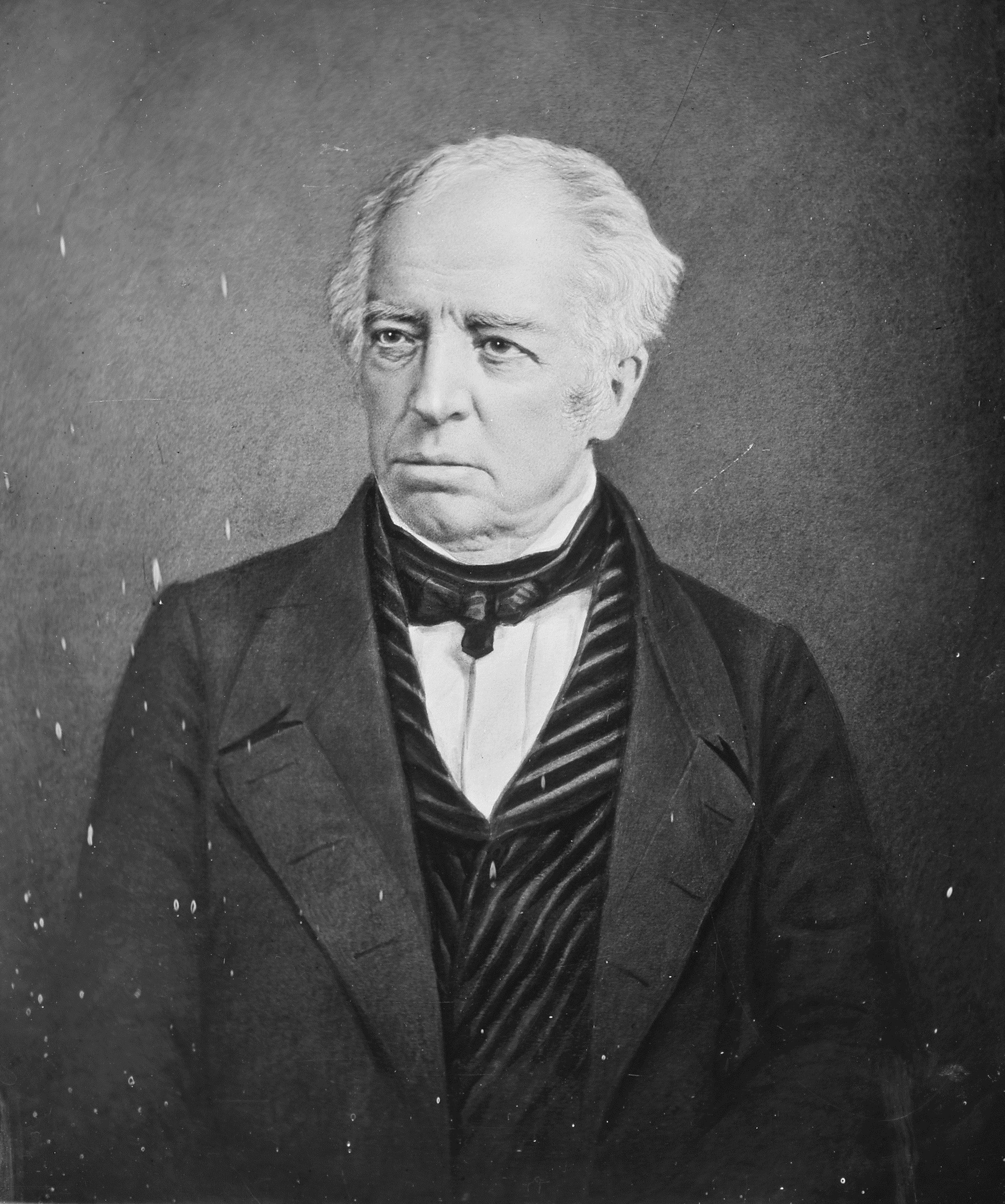
James Kent (c.1860–65)

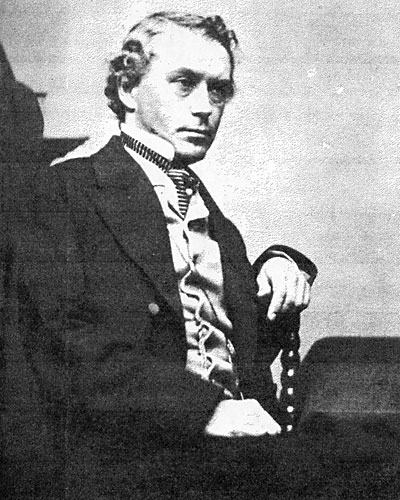
George Templeton Strong (c.1870)

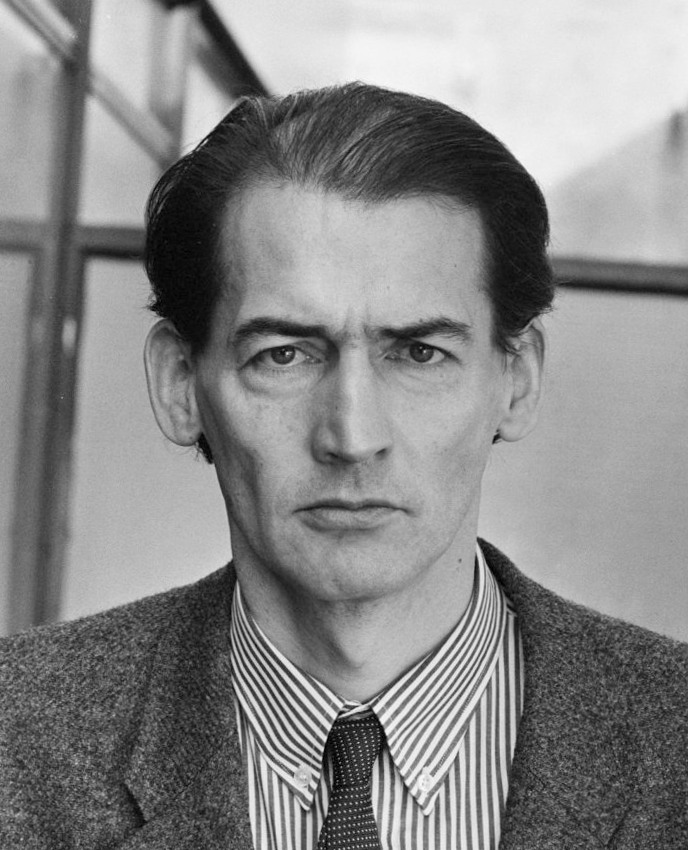
Dutch architect Rem Koolhaas (1987)

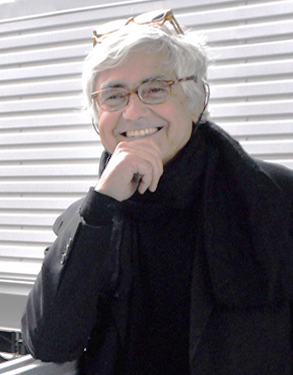
Rafael Viñoly (2011)

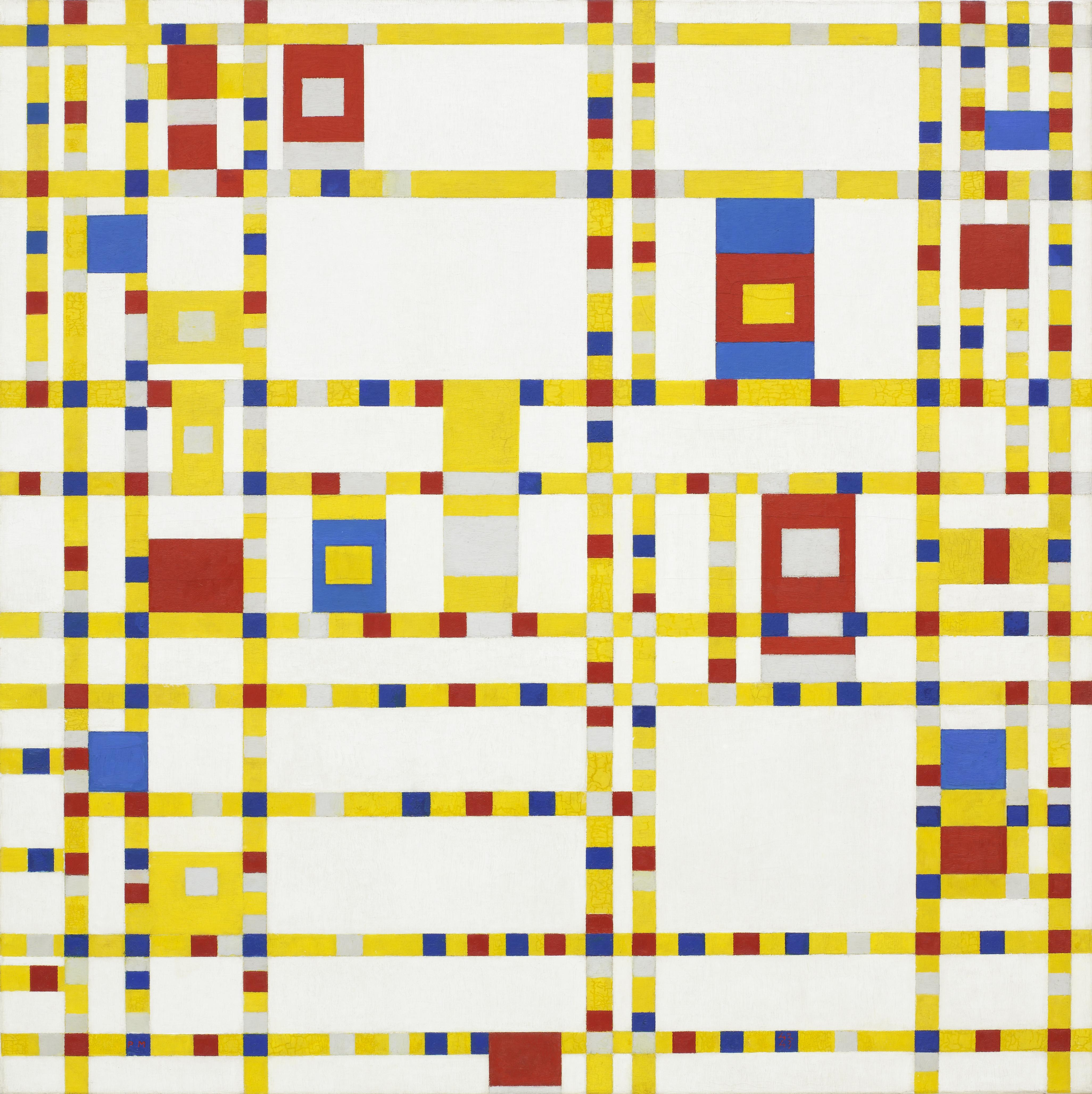
Dutch artist Piet Mondrian drew inspiration from the vibrancy of the grid, displaying it in paintings such as Broadway Boogie Woogie (1942).

James Kent, the eminent jurist and legal scholar, called the plan "brilliant", and wrote in 1896:

The map and plan of the Commissioners laid out the highways on the island upon so magnificent a scale, and with so bold a hand, and with such prophetic views, in respect of the future growth and extension of the city, that it will form an everlasting monument of the stability and wisdom of the measure.

The lawyer and noted diarist George Templeton Strong enthusiastically embraced the grid and its resulting growth, writing in his diary in 1850:

How this city marches northward! The progress of 1835 and 1836 was nothing to the luxuriant rank growth of this year. Streets are springing up, whole strata of sandstone have transferred themselves from their ancient resting places to look down on bustling thoroughfares for long years to come. Wealth is rushing in upon us like a freshet.

Architect Rem Koolhaas in his 1978 book Delirious New York comments that it created "undreamed-of freedom for three-dimensional anarchy," and called it "the most courageous act of prediction on Western civilization." Koolhaas celebrated the city's "poetic density" and sees the architecture of Manhattan as "a paradigm for the exploitation of congestion"; indeed he applauds the city's "culture of congestion." Because of the "magic carpet of the Grid", "all blocks are the same, their equivalence invalidates, at once, all the systems of articulation and differentiation that have guided the design of traditional cities. ... [It] made the history of architecture and all previous lessons of urbanism irrelevant. It forces Manhattan's builders to develop a new system of formal values, to invest strategies for the distinction of one block from another."

Modernist architect Le Corbusier gushed that "I insist on right-angled intersections", while Wendy Evans Joseph, another architect, extolled the grid as "embody[ing] something uniquely American, a democratic transparency, accessible and open to all ... a republican ideal, the synthesis of the rural order of the neatly laid out rows and furrows of the farm with the fiercely competitive, chaotic madness of the city."

Rafael Viñoly, a Uruguayan-born architect, called the grid "the best manifestation of American pragmatism in the creation of urban form," writing:

It is the unified formula that controls and organizes the forces that make the city what it is, what it was, and what it will become ... In this compact schema that concentrates prescriptions of scale, density, and serviceability all in one, the play between public and private interests is in the inevitable balance that transcends speculation without restricting liberty. It is the mechanism that has allowed mediocrity to coexist with greatness in a cohesive whole. ... Manhattan ... doesn't need architecture to be validated; it is the consequence of a free game in which the rules are clear and effective to produce it. ... I don't believe this planning grid can be a model for other cities to emulate, nor do I think it can be repeated, but I do believe it is a lesson in consistency and realism ...

One man argued that it was wrong to expect New York City to be beautiful. Niels Gron, born in Denmark, but very familiar with New York, said in 1900:

Before I came to this country, and in all the time I have been here, it has never occurred to me to think of New York as being beautiful. Therefore all this talk of beautifying New York seems strange to me. If we were discussing Bismarck I might ask five hundred questions about him before I should think of asking whether he was beautiful. ... So it is with New York. We expect of her power and magnificence, but not beauty. If a European came over here and found that New York was beautiful in the same way as the European cities he knew he would be very much disappointed. I do not see how you can make New York beautiful in that way with the laws and the democratic spirit that you have here The kind of beauty that makes Paris charming can only exist when private rights and personal liberty are or have been trampled on. Only when the mob rules, or where kings rule, so that there is at one time absolutely no respect for the property of the rich and at another time for the rights of the poor can the beauties of Paris be realized.

Journalist James Traub wrote that "Manhattan is a remorseless place to which its citizens are peculiarly adapted. and of which out-of-towners seem unaccountably fond. It was designed that way. ... I would never say that what I love about New York is its "utility," but I would say that the utilitarian street plan has made possible the helter-skelter, pell-mell life of the city – which is what I do love."

In 2013, Hilary Ballon, the curator of The Greatest Grid: The Master Plan of Manhattan 1811–2011, an exhibit at the Museum of the City of New York, wrote about the Commissioners' Plan:

[I]n our fast changing world where technology is outdated in a blink and future-proofing is the gold standard, the grid has demonstrated remarkable flexibility. Over two hundred years, the scale of architecture has changed from three-story walk-ups to skyscrapers more than 1,000 feet tall. Parks and avenues unanticipated by the plan have been created. The grid gave rise to a particular kind of urbanism. Unlike Washington, D.C., and the capital cities of Europe, New York does not have axial avenues that focus on star buildings. New York has buildings that sit cheek by jowl and anonymously form street walls. It has narrow canyons of space bounded by those street walls with views of the horizon. It has density and enclosure but also the thrill of open-ended space. Yet when modernist urban theories turned against the vernacular urbanism of New York, and superblocks and towers in the park were imposed on the city, the grid absorbed those inventions. Although New York's real estate dynamism is typically associated with disrespect for history, with buildings toppled for the next generation of taller ones, the 1811 grid endures as living history. The plan leaves its imprint on every block, lot, and building in Manhattan, and has provided a remarkably flexible framework for growth and change.

Ballon continues:

To early visitors, the grid was disorienting: the streets looked alike and offered no landmarks or mnemonic devices to distinguish one from the other. However, as New York matured and the grid was inflected by different neighborhoods, the disorientation of the grid lapsed. Amid the city's plenitude and infinite variety, the grid and its number address system provided an orienting framework. It requires no insider knowledge to find an address; visitors can easily navigate, except where the city is off the grid. New York's street system creates such transparency and accessibility that the grid serves as metaphor for the openness of New York itself!

Journalist and author David Owen wrote in his book Green Metropolis (2009) that "Gridlike street plans may seem unimaginative, but they increase the mobility of pedestrians and are almost always self-explanatory; walking in much of Manhattan, even in areas where the distances between avenues is great, is like walking on a map." Similarly, economist Edward Glaeser, author of Triumph of the City (2011), wrote that "Manhattan's grid imposes clarity on the island's burbling chaos and enables ordinary pedestrians to negotiate New York's complex ecosystem. While many city plans are more beautiful in the abstract, none has done more to facilitate the magnificent energy of the flowing human city. The grid makes manageable the messy humanity of millions. ... It may not be every urban planner's beau ideal, but as a machine for urban living, the grid is pretty perfect."

In The Shape of Green, architect Lance Hosey writes that the grid is well-adapted to its natural setting:

The plan of Manhattan is smarter than conventional wisdom concedes. Not a square grid, most of the streets run river to river instead of uptown and down, partly because the planners assumed that maritime commerce along the riverfronts would create more crosstown traffic. The blocks are nearly five times longer in the east–west dimension (avenue to avenue) than in the north–south (street to street), so most buildings avoid the low morning and afternoon sun, thereby ensuring plenty of light without too much heat. Because the grid sits at a twenty-nine-degree angle off of true north, potentially every building on every street can receive direct daylight every day of the year.

Finally, Roland Barthes, the French literary theorist, philosopher, linguist, critic, and semiotician, wrote in 1959: "This is the purpose of New York's geometry: that each individual should be poetically the owner of the capital of the world."

== See also ==
- Architecture of New York City
- Cartography of New York City
- City block
- Grid plan
- History of New York City
- Land ordinance of 1785
- Manhattanhenge
- Surveying
- Taxicab geometry (also called "Manhattan distance")
- Urban planning
- Zoning in the United States
