= Sarah Booth Conroy Prize =

Architecture prize

Sarah Booth Conroy Prize for Journalism and Architectural Criticism
- Awarded for: Reportorial or critical excellence in fostering a better public understanding of architecture and urbanism in Washington, DC
- Sponsored by: the Washington Chapter of the American Institute of Architects (AIA|DC)
- Country: USA
- Reward: US$5,000
- First award: 2016
- Final award: 2019
- Website: www.aiadc.com/SarahBoothConroyPrize

The Sarah Booth Conroy Prize has been awarded annually since 2016 for "reportorial or critical excellence in fostering a better public understanding of architecture and urbanism in Washington, DC." Named after Sarah Booth Conroy, the prize recognizes professional journalists and architecture critics covering the greater Washington, DC region.

Sarah Booth Conroy (1928 - 2009) wrote architecture criticism for the Washington Post for more than 30 years. She was the inaugural recipient of the Washington Architectural Foundation's Glenn Brown Award, which recognizes "an individual who has improved the quality of life in DC and raised awareness of architecture and its benefits to society." Conroy wrote more than 2,800 articles for the Washington Post, focusing on the history of Washington, DC with a column called "Chronicles."

== Past winners ==
No.	Year	Laureate	Nationality	Ref.
1	2016	Kriston Capps	United States	
2	2017	Amanda Kolson Hurley	United States	
3	2018	Lance Hosey	United States	
4	2019	Deborah Dietsch	United States	
5	2019	Jonathan O'Connell	United States	

== 2016 ==
Kriston Capps, who won the inaugural Sarah Booth Conroy Prize in 2016, is a staff writer at CityLab, a division of Atlantic Media, and a former senior editor of Architect Magazine. Selected works: "Requiem for a Nightmare," CityLab, July 30, 2014 "Architect David Jameson knows D.C.'s buildings don't have to be ugly. Now he's trying to convince the rest of the world, too." Washington City Paper, February 14, 2014

== 2017 ==
Amanda Kolson Hurley is a senior editor at CityLab and a former editor of Architect Magazine. She wrote a column called "Concrete Details" for Washington City Paper from 2015 to 2017. Selected works: "Why Painting the Union Station Metro Cheapens an Architectural Masterpiece" Washington City Paper, March 30, 2017 "Grayed Expectations: What's With All the Gray Houses?" Washington City Paper, December 23, 2017

== 2018 ==
Lance Hosey was an architect and writer whose opinion columns appeared on Huffington Post from 2013 to 2017. Selected works: "Is Washington its own worst enemy for sustainable design?" Huffington Post, June 12, 2017 "The Space of Resistance" Huffington Post, December 29, 2016

== 2019 ==
In 2019, AIA|DC honored two winners, Deborah K. Dietsch and Jonathan O'Connell, with the Sarah Booth Conroy Prize. Citing the important work of Dietsch for architectural criticism and O'Connell for his work on urbanism, this year's jury felt that they offered "two different perspectives of architectural writing ... and that both of these perspectives are important to Washington."

Deborah Dietsch writes a column called Design Perspectives for the Washington Business Journal. She also writes for The Washington Post, and Home and Design Magazine, and is the former editor-in-chief of Architecture Magazine.

Jonathan O'Connell has been a staff reporter for The Washington Post since 2010, and covers urban development for the paper.
