= The Shape of Green =

2012 book by Lance Hosey

- First edition cover
- Author: Lance Hosey
- Genre: Sustainable Design, Architecture, Aesthetics
- Publisher: Island Press
- Publication date: 2012
- Publication place: United States
- Media type: Print
- Pages: 216
- ISBN: 1-61091-032-X

The Shape of Green: Aesthetics, Ecology, and Design is a 2012 non-fiction book by the American architect Lance Hosey. The first book dedicated to the relationships between sustainability and beauty, it outlines a set of principles for the aesthetics of sustainable design. It was first published on 1 June 2012 through Island Press.

== Synopsis ==
The book is a critique of conventional standards of sustainable design, which emphasize ethics or technology over aesthetics. Alternatively, Hosey argues that sustainability must include sensory engagement to promote human enjoyment, respect for places, and preservation of resources. The book offers three general principles for an aesthetics of sustainable design:

- Conservation: shaping things to be efficient with resources
- Attraction: shaping things to appeal to human desire
- Connection: shaping things to fit their context

The book shows how these themes apply to any scale of design, including graphics, fashion design, products, buildings, and cities.

== Reception ==
Critical reception has been positive. TreeHugger called it "important" and "significant," and Environmental Building News praised the book as "long overdue." Builder magazine wrote that The Shape of Green could "revolutionize what it means to be sustainable." John Elkington has praised it as "a passionate book", and "an inspirational guide to a future we can't wait to embrace." Publishers Weekly also gave a favorable review: "[Hosey's] underlying argument—that green living doesn't have to be punishing, expensive, or boring—is a refreshing take on an old debate that fans of Malcolm Gladwell and other big thinkers will find informative and illuminating."

=== Honors and awards ===
- Listed among the books that all designers should read. (2017)
- National Urban Design Book Award (2014, finalist)
- New York Book Show Merit Award (2013)
- Notable Design Books, Designers & Books (2012)
