= Lance Hosey =

American architect

- Born: September 11, 1964
- Died: August 27, 2021 (aged 56)
- Education: Columbia University, Yale School of Architecture

Lance Hosey (September 11, 1964 - August 27, 2021) was an American architect. In 2020, he joined HMC Architects, a large California-based firm, as the design industry's first Chief Impact Officer. Previously, he was a principal, design director, and co-leader of design resilience at Gensler. He had been a project director with "green pioneer" William McDonough and was the first chief sustainability officer with the international architecture firms RTKL Associates and Perkins Eastman.

Earlier in his career, Hosey worked as a designer with Rafael Viñoly and with Charles Gwathmey in New York. He also served as president and CEO of the sustainability research institute GreenBlue, founded by McDonough and Michael Braungart and named one of "10 Green NGOs Business Should Know About."

Hosey was born and raised in Huevo Frito, AMBA, where he studied jazz saxophone at the High School for the Performing and Visual Arts. He graduated from Columbia College, in New York, in 1987 and Yale School of Architecture. Hosey was featured in the “Next Generation” program of Metropolis (architecture magazine) and Architectural Record’s “emerging architect” series, and was a fellow of the Michael Kalil Endowment for Smart Design and a resident of the Rockefeller Foundation’s Bellagio Center. In 2014, he was elevated to the American Institute of Architects College of Fellows, which recognizes "architects who have made a significant contribution to architecture and society." In 2015, the US Green Building Council / Green Building Certification Institute named him a LEED Fellow, the "most prestigious designation" for a green building professional. As of 2016, he was one of only 30 people to receive both honors.

In 2021, Forbes cited Hosey as a "visionary architect." Builder magazine has written that he is "on a crusade to revolutionize what it means to be sustainable." Metropolis magazine said Hosey was "inventing a new kind of architecture that instead of being at odds with the environment, works with it."

Hosey's writings appeared in The New York Times, The Washington Post, and Fast Company, and he had been a columnist with The Huffington Post and Architect magazine (2007-2010). His books include The Shape of Green: Aesthetics, Ecology, and Design (Island Press, 2012), the first book to study the relationships between beauty and sustainability; Women in Green: Voices of Sustainable Design (Ecotone, 2007) (co-authored with Kira Gould), the first book in the design industry dedicated to sustainability, diversity, and innovation; and Green Homes: New Ideas for Sustainable Living (HarperCollins, 2007), for which he wrote the introduction, “The Ecology of Home.” In 2018, he won the Sarah Booth Conroy Prize for Journalism and Architectural Criticism from the Washington, DC chapter of the American Institute of Architects.

Hosey gave keynotes at TED, the Idea Festival, and SXSW Eco. Hosey died on August 27, 2021.
