= Cartography of New York City =

Aspect of New York City's history

The cartography of New York City is the creation, editing, processing and printing of maps that depict the islands and mainland that now comprise New York City and its immediate environs. The earliest surviving map of the area is the Manatus Map of 1631.

According to Robert T. Augstyn and Paul E. Cohen in their study Manhattan in Maps: 1527 - 1995, New York City is unique in that it is young enough that, unlike major European and Asian cities, and unlike other American cities of about the same age, its early maps have survived. Further, its founding as a city for European immigrants came during the early- and mid-seventeenth century, a golden age of mapmaking with its center in Holland. When New Amsterdam was a young colony, Amsterdam was turning out more accurate maps than ever before in history. As a commercial city, the merchants and seafarers of the new colony needed more and better maps so they could monitor and extend their commercial activities.

When the British took over New Amsterdam and renamed it New York, surveying and mapmaking continued, but at a slower pace, which was connected to the reduced rate of growth of the city under British rule, and the lack of close administration of the colony by the mother country than had been the case under the Dutch.

During the American Revolution, New York City and its environs was an early battleground, and then the headquarters of the British. This provoked maps to be used in military campaigns, or in the defense of the city. New York became "the most thoroughly mapped urban area in America."

== Indigenous mapping ==
There are no written records that directly reference mapping by the Wappinger or the Lenape, the Native Americans who inhabited the New York City area before European colonization. However, scholars assume the Native Americans who lived on the land that now comprises New York City, as in other places, passed down a record of the spatial distribution of their resources and territory via an oral tradition.

A large Native American footpath extending into Canada, the Northeastern Great Trail, ran through the land now known as New York City. The footpath served as a trade route for the Algonquian and Iroquoian-speaking indigenous peoples who lived along the Great Trail. No maps of the Great Trail are known to have existed; however, scholars hypothesize information on the trading route was passed down via oral tradition and possibly also impermanent bark scrolls similar to the Ojibwe wiigwaasabak. Written reports describe the Lenape using bark scrolls to draw pictographs to map areas, including the particularly elaborate though questionable Walam Olum; however, none of these maps survive today. Thomas Dermer in a 1619 letter described a Lenape harbor pilot, at his request, drawing an accurate map of Manhattan and surrounding waters, drafting it in chalk on a seaman's chest.

== Colonial mapping ==
The earliest surviving map of the area now known as New York City is the Manatus Map, depicting what is now Manhattan, Brooklyn, the Bronx, Queens, Staten Island, and New Jersey in the early days of New Amsterdam. The Dutch colony was mapped by cartographers working for the Dutch Republic. New Netherland had a position of surveyor general. Surveyors and cartographers active during this period of early modern Netherlandish cartography include Cryn Fredericks, Jacques Cortelyou, Andries Hudde and Johannes Vingboons. From the Manatus Map onward, much early cartography of the area had the West as its map orientation. Mapping continued and intensified after the British took control of the colony and renamed it New York in 1664.

== American mapping ==
Mapping of New York City continued during the American Revolutionary War. One of the last maps under British occupation was made in 1781 by two military cartographers. The first official map of New York City under independence was likely the Commissioners' Plan of 1811.

Columbus Circle serves as a geographic center for New York City, taking the role of a zero-mile point. It has been used as such by the city government for its employees, by the United Nations for the C-2 visa, and by Hagstrom Map.

The first map to extensively depict New York City's transit lines is a United States Geological Survey map of southern Brooklyn drafted in 1888. The first subway focused map was published in 1904-1905 when several maps were published alongside the opening of the IRT subway. The New York City Subway map in use today came about in 1958 when George Salomon redesigned the previous map model where individual subway operating companies made their own maps. The change to a singular map was facilitated by the Board of Transportation and later the New York City Transit Authority taking over and managing the subway system as a singular entity. In 2016, Rebecca Solnit and Joshua Jelly Schapiro created a "City of Women" map based on the Vignelli subway map, renaming each subway station for a woman who contributed to New York City.

In 2021, the Brooklyn Historical Society published a digitized database of ~1,500 maps of New York City and the surrounding areas dating back to the 17th century.

== Notable maps of New York City ==
| Map | Map name | Date depicting | Published | Author | Commissioned by | Geography depicted |
|---|---|---|---|---|---|---|
| | Maggiolo Map (Note: The map was housed in the Biblioteca Ambrosiana in Milan and was destroyed during World War II. A version from 1531 is in the Louvre Abu Dhabi. "Maggiolo World Map") | 1527 (?) | | Vesconte de Maggiolo (or Maiollo) | | East coasts of North, Central and South America, and Caribbean Sea |
| | Gastaldi Map | | 1556 | Giacomo di Gastaldi | | New York to Labrador |
| | Velasco Map | 1610 | | unknown | Alonso de Velasco y Salinas (?) | Chesapeake Bay to Labrador |
| | Block Figurative Map | 1614 | | Adriaen Block and Cornelis Doetsz | | New York to Maine |
| | Minuit Chart | c.1630 | c.1660 (drawn) | Peter Minuit (?) | | Hudson (North) River in New Netherland, including Manhattan ("Manatus") |
| | De Laet-Gerritsz Map | c.1625-1630 | 1630 by Johannes de Laet | Hessel Gerritsz | | Virginia to Nova Scotia |
| | Manatus Map | 1639 | | Author disputed | New Netherland | Manhattan, Brooklyn, the Bronx, Queens, Staten Island, New Jersey |
| | Jansson-Visscher Map | c.1651-1653 | c.1655-1677 by Claes Janzoon Visscher | Augustine Hermann (?) | | Delaware Bay to Maine |
| | Goos Chart | c.1656 | 1666 or 1672 by Pieter Goos | unknown | | Delaware Bay to New York Bay |
| | Castello Plan | 1660 | 1667 Reprinted and named Castello Plan in 1916 | Jacques Cortelyou | New Netherland | Manhattan |
| | Duke's Plan | 1664 | 1859 | George Hayward | Lithograph for Valentine's Manual | Manhattan, Long Island (Brooklyn), New Jersey |
| | Jollain View (fictitious) | 1672 | 1672 (?) by Gérard or François Jollain | unknown | | supposedly New Amsterdam (Manhattan), actually based on a view of Lisbon from c.1580 |
| | Tiddeman Chart | 1749 | | Mark Tiddeman | George Hayward name | Manhattan, Long Island (Brooklyn & Queens), Staten Island, New Jersey |
| | Montresor Map | 1766 | | John Montresor | Thomas Gage for the British Army | Manhattan, Long Island (Brooklyn), Staten Island, New Jersey |
| | British Headquarters Map | 1782 | | | | |
| | Ratzer Map | 1767 | | Bernard Ratzer | Sir Henry Moore, 1st Baronet | Manhattan, Long Island (Brooklyn & Queens), New Jersey |
| | Taylor Map | 1797 | | Benjamin Taylor, artist John Roberts, engraver | | Southern end of Manhattan, Brooklyn |
| | Commissioners' Plan of 1811 | 1811 | | Gouverneur Morris, John Rutherfurd, Simeon De Witt, and John Randel Jr. | New York State Legislature | Manhattan |
| | Manhattan Blue Book | 1815 | 1815 Expanded edition published in 1868 | Otto Sackersdorf | | Manhattan |
| | Commissioners' Plan of 1821 | 1811 | 1821 | John Randel Jr. | | Manhattan, Long Island (Brooklyn & Queens), the Bronx, Connecticut, Massachusetts |
| | The Eddy Map | 1823 | 1828 | John H. Eddy | | Manhattan, Long Island, Bronx, New Jersey, Staten Island |
| | Mahon Map | | 1831 by S. Mahon | William Chapin | | Lower Manhattan |
| | Hooker Map | | 1831 | William Hooker | Peabody and Company | Manhattan |
| | David H. Burr Map | | 1834 | David H. Burr | | Manhattan, Brooklyn |
| | Bradford Map | 1839 | | Thomas Gamaliel Bradford | | Manhattan, Brooklyn, New Jersey |
| | Mitchell Map | 1846 | | Samuel Augustus Mitchell | | Manhattan, Brooklyn |
| | Colton Map | 1853 | | J. H. Colton | | Manhattan, Long Island, Bronx, New Jersey, Staten Island |
| | New York Bay and Harbor, 1861 | 1861 | | United States Coast Guard | | Manhattan, Long Island (Brooklyn & Queens), Bronx, New Jersey, Staten Island |
| | Dripps Map | 1863 | | Matthew Dripps | | Manhattan, Brooklyn |
| | Viele Map | 1865 | | Egbert Ludovicus Viele | | |
| | Rogers Map | 1868 | | W. C. Rogers | | Manhattan |
| | Beers Map | 1872 | | Fredrick W. Beers | | Manhattan, Brooklyn, Long Island City |

== See also ==
- New York City Subway map
- The Iconography of Manhattan Island 1915-1928 book by Isaac Newton Phelps Stokes
