= Cartography of the United States =

Mapping of the United States

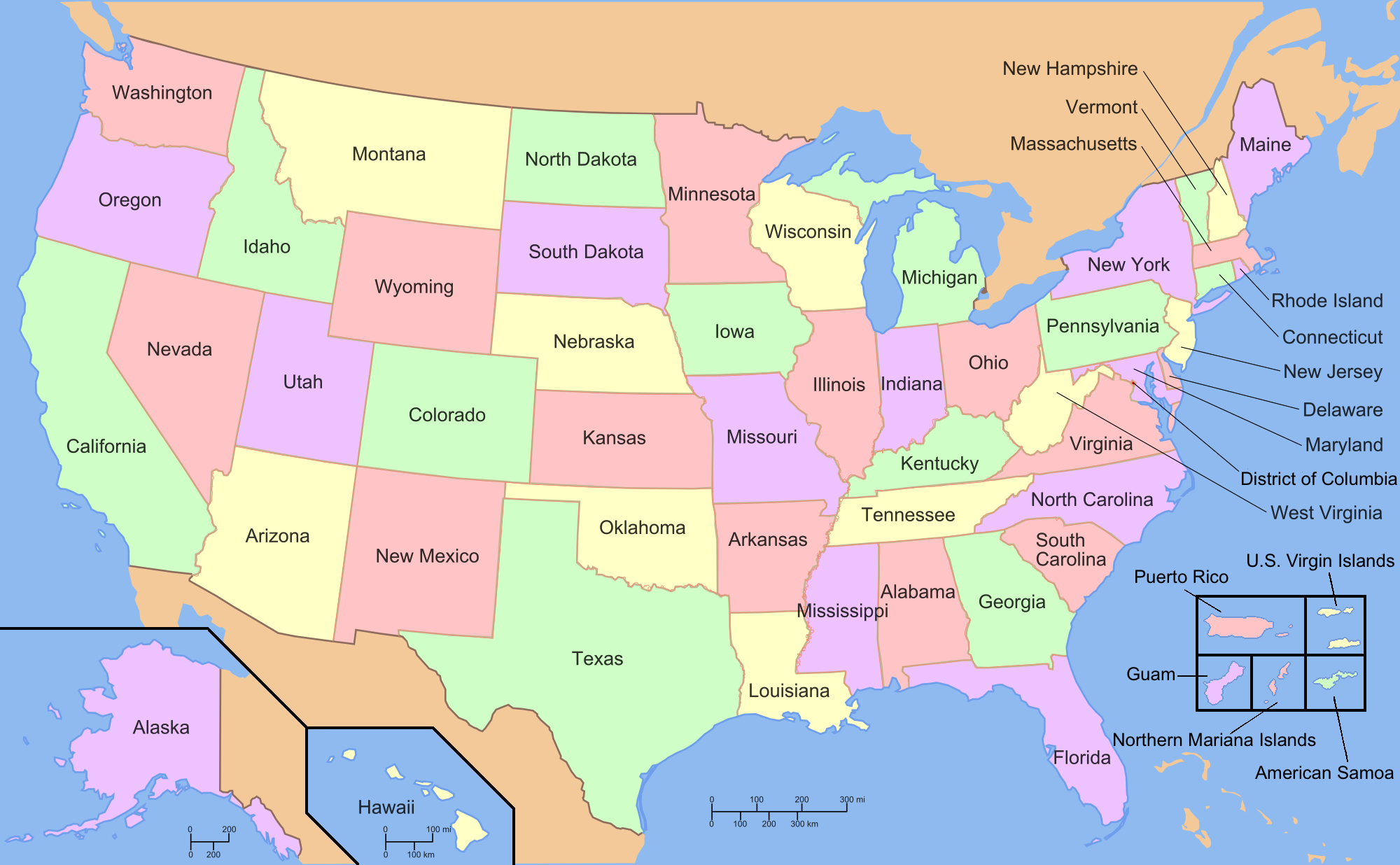
Map of the United States with state and territory names

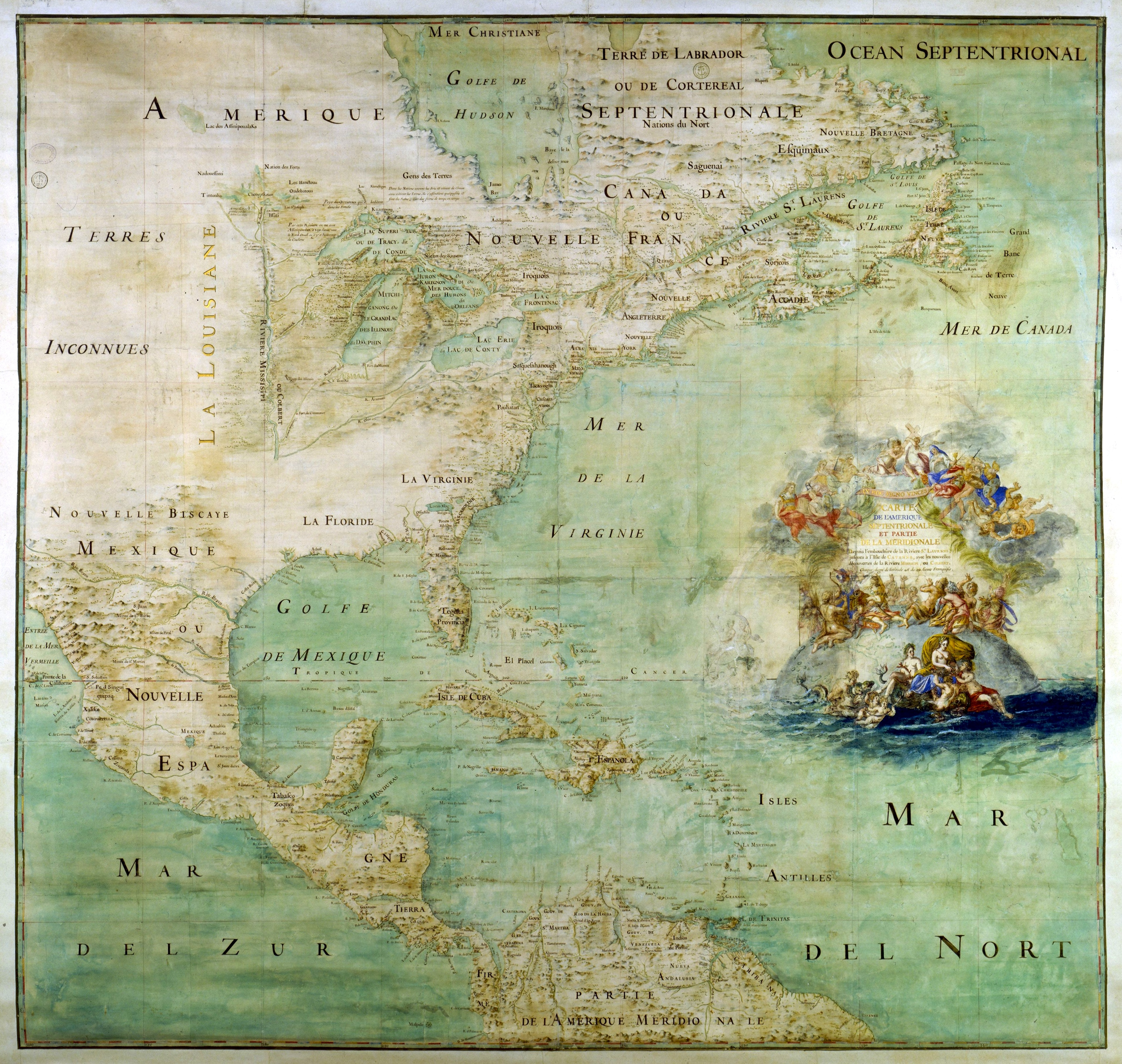
1681 map of North America

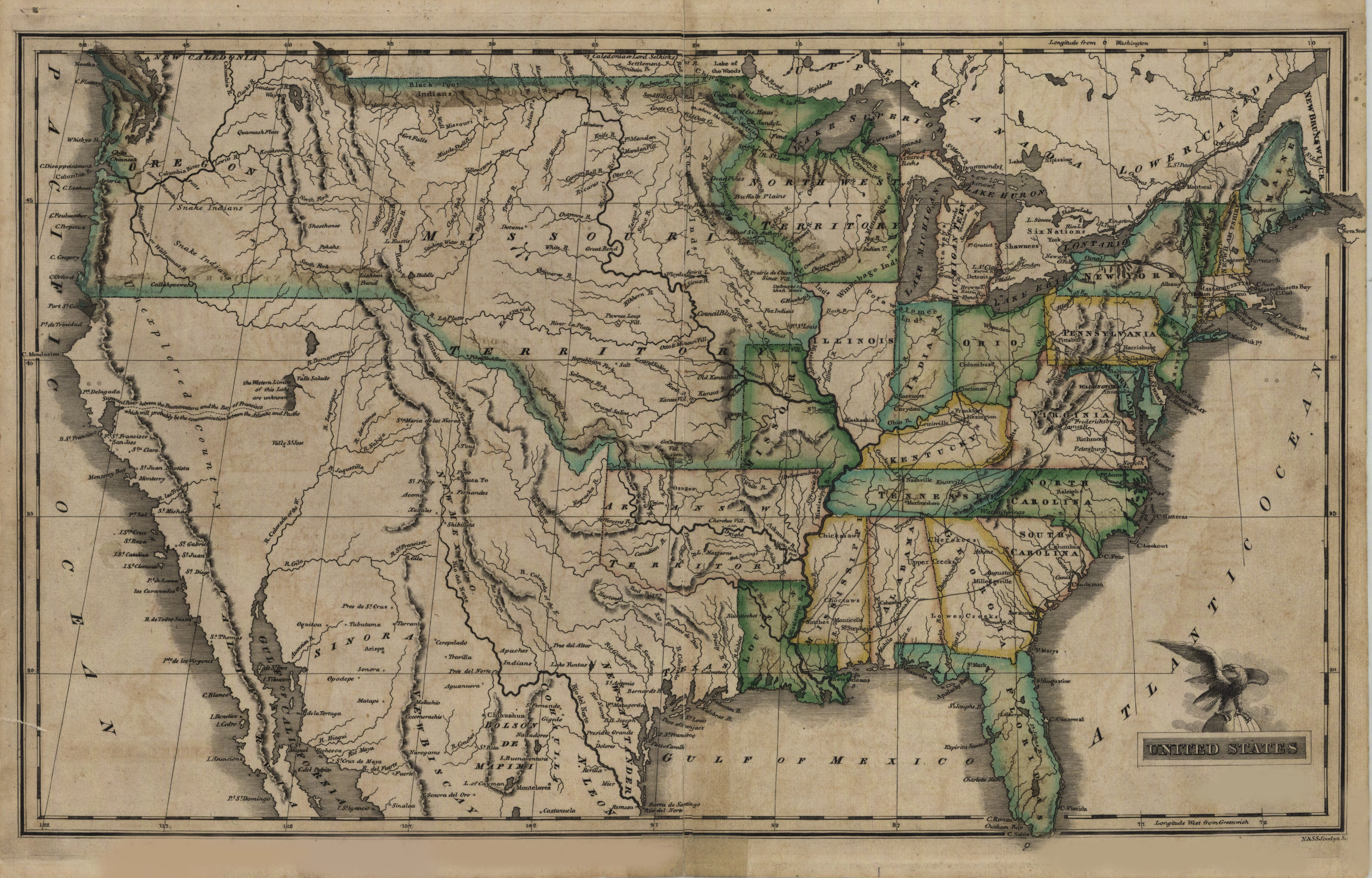
Antebellum map of the United States, published by Sidney E. Morse in An Atlas of the United States (1823), showing the recent acquisition of Missouri and Louisiana, and the remnant of the Northwest Territory after the establishment of Ohio, Indiana and Missouri

The cartography of the United States is the history of surveying and creation of maps of the United States. Maps of the New World have been produced since the 16th century. The history of cartography of the United States began in the 18th century, after the declared independence of the original Thirteen Colonies on July 4, 1776, during the American Revolutionary War (1776–1783). Later, Samuel Augustus Mitchell published a map of the United States in 1850. The National Program for Topographic Mapping was initiated in 1884 by the United States Geological Survey (USGS).

== See also ==
- Geography of the United States
- Territorial evolution of the United States
- United States National Grid
- Cartography of New York City
