= Viele Map =

19th century map of New York City

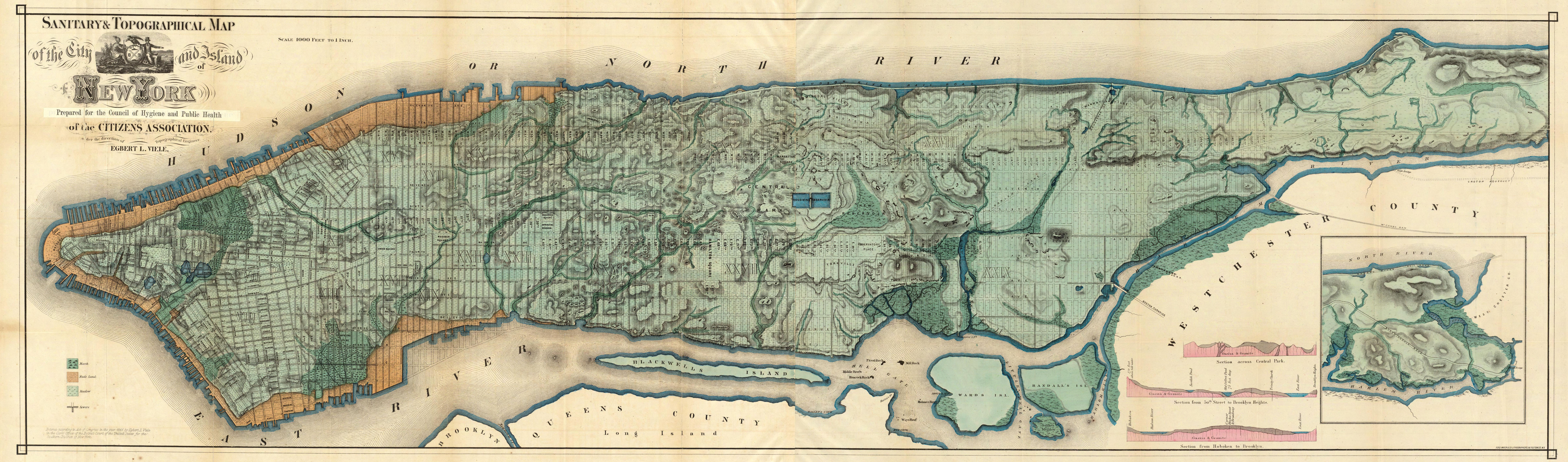
- The 1865 edition

- The 1874 edition
- Created: 1865
- Author: Egbert Ludovicus Viele
- Media type: topographic map

The Viele Map is a notable 19th-century topographic map of New York City created by American civil and military engineer Egbert Ludovicus Viele. It was first published in 1865 under the title Sanitary & Topographical Map of the City and Island of New York, with a new edition titled Topographical atlas of the city of New York (Note: Full title: Topographical atlas of the city of New York, including the annexed territory showing original water courses and made land.) released in 1874.

The map documents Viele's original survey of Manhattan's relief and water objects (such as streams, rivers, and marshes), as well the island's shoreline, all before those were modified by landmass expansions. The map superimposes a detailed hachure map of the island over the city's street grid.

Due to its value at preserving the history of New York City, as well as a long record of engineering and urban planning applications, it has been called “the most enduring nineteenth-century map of Manhattan”.

== History ==
Viele started mapping Manhattan after his appointment as the engineer-in-chief of the Central Park that was at the time being created in Upper Manhattan. Viele was tasked with mapping the territory reserved for the park by the Commissioners' Plan of 1811 but ended up producing a survey of the whole island, which he based largely on the archival cartographic materials of John Randel Jr.

A first fragment of the map covering Lower Manhattan was published in the 1859 report of the New York State Senate that called for the proper management of sanitary conditions of the rapidly expanding city.

The first full version of the map was issued in 1865 as a supplement to the Report of the Council of Hygiene and Public Health under the title Sanitary & Topographical Map of the City and Island of New York. A separate edition came out in 1874 as the Topographical Atlas of the City of New York, including the Annexed Territory, Showing the Original Water Courses and Made Land. It had enlarged maps and included multiple corrections made since the first publication in 1865.

== Urban planning applications ==
The map has been used by geotechnical engineers, structural engineers and planners to design the foundations of new buildings and structures in the city. Paul Starrett, an American builder responsible for the construction of the Empire State Building and Stuyvesant Town, reportedly always consulted the Viele map to insure the feasibility of a project.

Likewise, the Viele map was relied upon when erecting the Citigroup Center at Lexington Avenue and 54th Street, where it correctly identified a stream running diagonally across the parcel. Melvin Febesh of the Urban Foundation Company, which was directly involved in the project, later found the map to be “accurate within feet”.
