= Benjamin Wright (civil engineer) =

American civil engineer

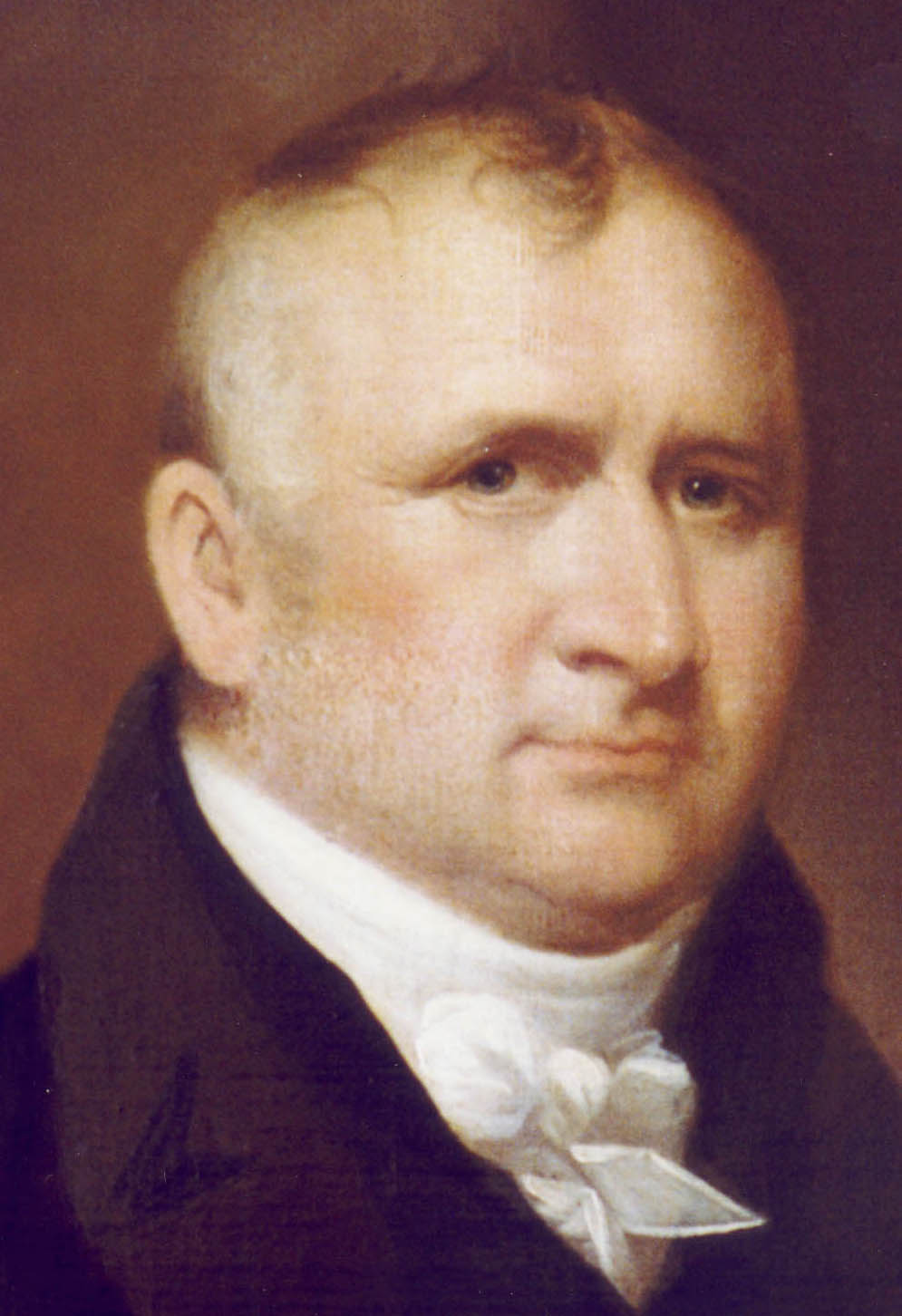
- Benjamin Wright
- Born: October 10, 1770; Wethersfield, Connecticut Colony
- Died: August 24, 1842 (aged 71); New York City, United States
- Resting place: New York Marble Cemetery
- Spouse: Philomela Waterman (m. 1798; died 1835)
- Children: 9
- Engineering career
- Projects: Erie Canal; Chesapeake and Ohio Canal

Benjamin Wright (October 10, 1770 – August 24, 1842) was an American civil engineer who was chief engineer of the Erie Canal and the Chesapeake and Ohio Canal. In 1969, the American Society of Civil Engineers declared him the "Father of American Civil Engineering".

== Early life ==
Wright was born in Wethersfield, Connecticut, to Ebenezer Wright and Grace Butler.

== Career ==
In 1789, at age 19, he moved with his family to Fort Stanwix, New York, which is now Rome, New York, where he became a land surveyor. Over the next decade, Wright worked as a land surveyor and engineer, especially on the construction of the Erie Canal and later on the Chesapeake and Ohio Canal. In addition to his engineering work, Wright was also elected to the New York State Legislature in 1794 and was appointed a New York county judge.

Wright returned to New York in about 1833. He continued to work primarily as a consultant on a number of canal projects, but also began doing surveys for railroads, which were in the early stages of development at the time.

=== Oneida and Oswego counties ===
Wright began his career surveying the frontier areas of Oneida and Oswego counties. In 1794 Wright was hired as a surveyor and planner by the noted English canal designer William Weston. Working for Weston, he helped lay out canals and locks on the Mohawk River. After Weston returned to England in 1801, Wright was commissioned to survey the Mohawk River between Schenectady and Rome, and then to the Hudson River.

Wright initially surveyed the Mohawk River from Rome to the Hudson River on behalf of the Western Inland Lock Navigation Company, but that company lacked the resources to build the canal.

=== Erie Canal ===
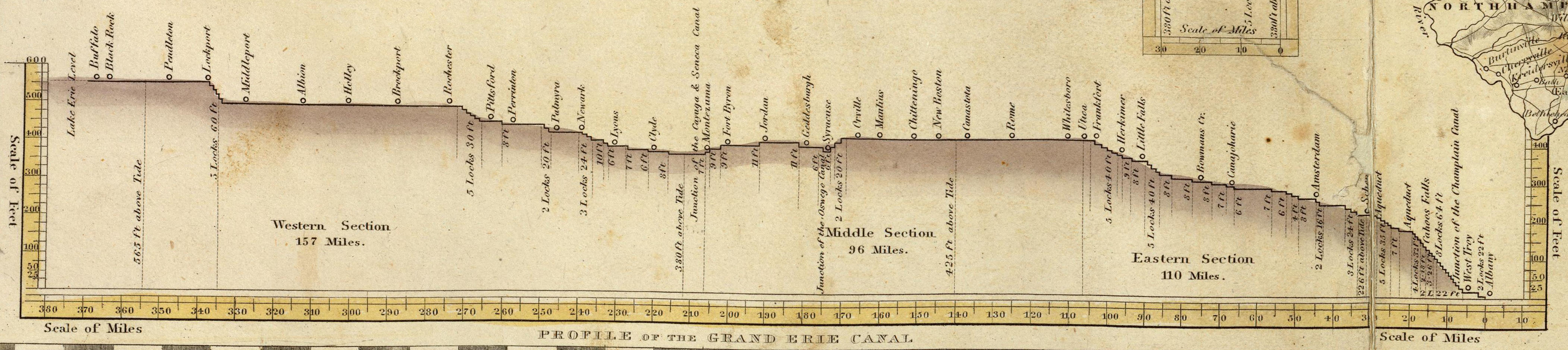
Profile of the original Erie Canal, c. 1830s

Wright surveyed the same route of the Mohawk River from Rome to the Hudson River again for the New York State Canal Commission in 1811, and by 1816 funding for the Erie Canal was in place. Its construction began in 1817. The ASCE (1996) explained:

What created challenges for the canal construction were the multiple elevation changes along the route. Hence, the supply of water to the canal and the drainage of excess water were far trickier than single sloped canals. To keep water flowing, an elaborate system of feeders and waste weirs was created. Furthermore, the east-west canal had to transverse multiple north-south running rivers, which called for numerous aqueducts, the largest employing 11 Roman-style arches to span 802 feet across the Genesee River Valley.

The following year Wright was appointed senior engineer in charge of construction of the middle section of the Erie Canal, and later, he was placed in charge of the eastern section as well. He led thousands of unskilled laborers as they built the canal with wheelbarrows, hand tools, horses, and mules. In Wright's honor, the first boat to traverse the canal system was named the Chief Engineer.

=== Other canal work ===
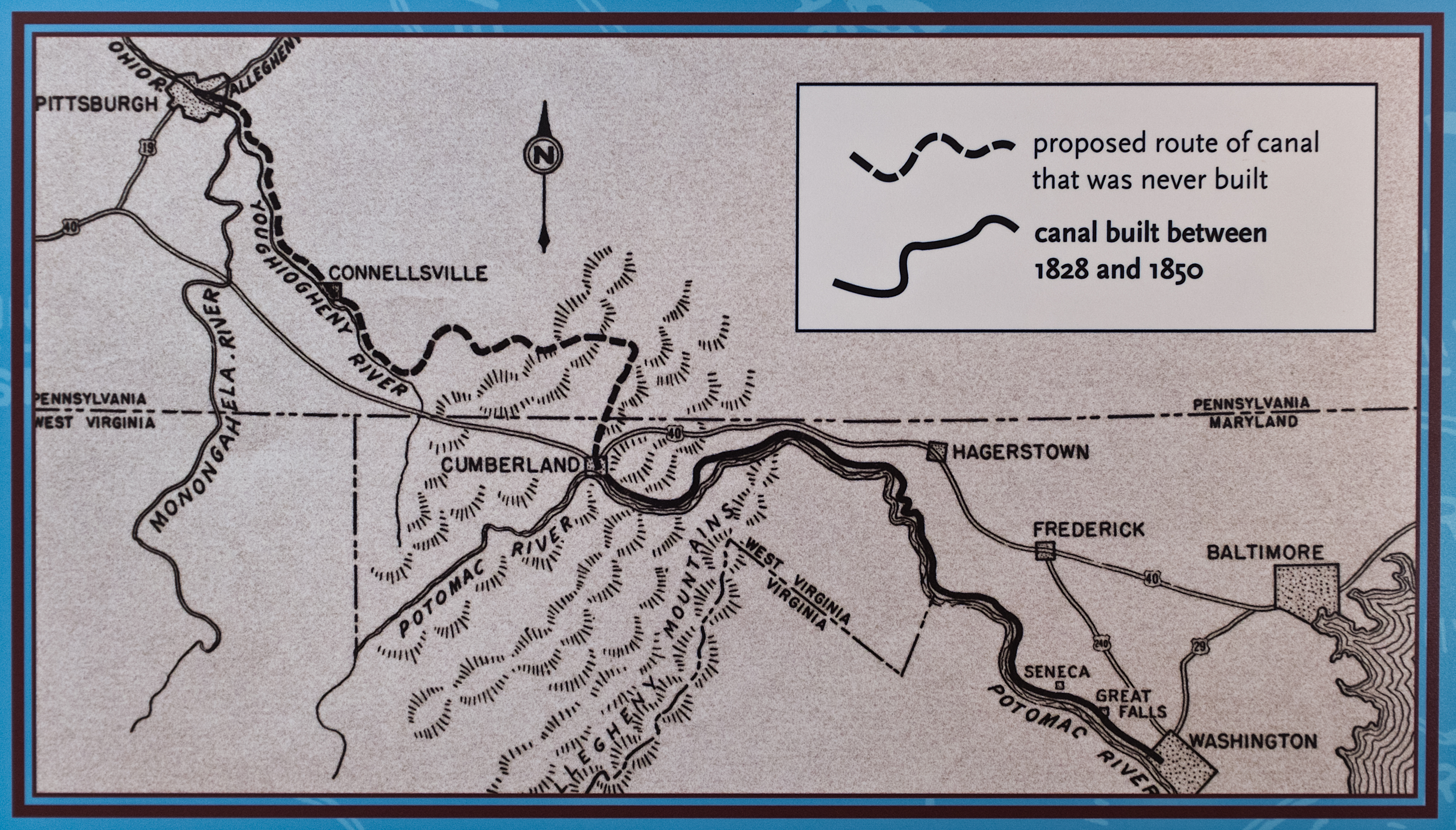
Proposed route of Chesapeake and Ohio Canal

In 1822 Wright was engaged by the Chesapeake & Delaware Canal Company to be the canal's chief engineer. While holding that position, he caused John Randel Jr. – who had surveyed the route taken by the canal, and who had been hired as an engineer to build its difficult eastern section – to be fired by the company. Randel sued the company for breach of contract, and tried to sue Wright as well, but that case was thrown out. In 1834 a jury returned an award to Randel of $226,885.84 (equivalent to $7,317,068 in 2025), a tremendous amount for the time. The canal company's appeals went as high as the United States Supreme Court, which affirmed the award. The company attempted to avoid paying the judgment, but the state legislatures of both Maryland and Delaware passed bills requiring the canal company to pay off its debts within five years. The huge award almost bankrupted the company.

Wright was approached in 1825 by the Wurts brothers of Philadelphia to survey a possible route from the coalfields of Northeastern Pennsylvania to the Hudson, where anthracite could be shipped by boat downriver to New York City. Wright consented, and served as chief engineer on the Delaware and Hudson Canal for about a year. At that point, he stepped down and became a consulting engineer; the job of chief was taken by John B. Jervis, who had worked under Wright on the Erie Canal.

In 1828, Wright was made Chief Engineer of the newly organized Chesapeake and Ohio Canal, which operated on a route along the Potomac River between Washington, D.C., and Cumberland, Maryland. Within a year, Wright had let contracts for a massive construction effort that encompassed about 6,000 men and 700 horses.

== Personal life ==
Wright married Philomela Waterman on September 27, 1798; they had nine children, five of whom became civil engineers. One of them, Benjamin Hall Wright (1801-1881), attended the United States Military Academy at West Point, where he graduated as part of the Class of 1822. As a civil engineer, the younger Wright promoted the establishment of railroads in Cuba, including the survey of the Havana-Guines railroad in 1834. He was also involved with the engineering of the Cardenas and Bemba Railroad in Cuba in 1836 and the Nuevitas and Puerto Principe Railroad, built between 1837 and 1842.

The elder Benjamin Wright died in New York City on August 24, 1842. He buried in the New York Marble Cemetery in Manhattan.

In 1970, a historical marker was dedicated at the approximate location of his birthplace in Wethersfield.

== Publications ==
- Moncure Robinson, Jonathan Knight, Benjamin Hall Wright (1835) Report of M. Robinson ... Jonathan Knight ... and Benjamin Wright ... Civil Engineers, upon the plan of the New-York and Erie Rail Road. Scott & Company, 1835
- Benjamin Hall Wright (1843) Report of the Survey of the Route of the New-York and Erie Railroad ... Together with the Report of a Special Committee of the Common Council of the City of New-York, in relation thereto. Office of the Railroad Journal.
- Benjamin Hall Wright (1870) Origin of the Erie Canal: Services of Benjamin Wright. Sandford & Carr
- Pennington, Steven M. Benjamin Wright: Father of American Civil Engineering. Reston, VA: ASCE Press, 2020.
