= John Randel Jr. =

American surveyor

The only known image of John Randel Jr.; painted by an unknown artist, probably Ezra Ames.

John Randel Jr. (1787–1865) was an American surveyor, cartographer, civil engineer, and inventor from Albany, New York who completed a full survey of Manhattan Island from 1808 to 1817, in service of the creation of the Commissioners' Plan of 1811, which determined that New York City – which consisted at the time of only Manhattan – would in the future be laid out in a rectilinear grid of streets.

Randel is also noted for having received one of the largest awards at the time as a result of his breach of contract lawsuit against the Chesapeake & Delaware Canal Company. The company's appeals of the judgment went to the United States Supreme Court, which affirmed the award, as well as Randel's right to directly receive canal tolls in order to collect it.

== Early life ==
Randel was born in Albany, New York on December 3, 1787 to a large and close family; he was one of the middle children. His father, John Sr. (1755–1823), was a second generation Scotch-Irish American who was a jeweler and brass founder, while his mother Catherine (or Katurah or Keturah; 1761–1836) was born in New Jersey to a land-rich family. John Sr. served in the American Revolutionary War as a private, and married Catherine in 1780, a year after he was released from his regiment for the injuries he had sustained.

John Jr.'s formal education encompassed only primary school, where he learned to respect the ideas and ideals of the Enlightenment. As a young man, Randel would be deeply committed to reason, but was also a religious man, disagreeing, for instance with Thomas Paine's views about religion expressed in The Age of Reason. Raised in a very tight-knit Presbyterian community, Randel attended church regularly, and strictly held the Sabbath as a day of rest; one of his workers later complained that they were unable to keep up with their correspondence because Randel would not let him write letters on Sundays. While working in Manhattan, Randel sometimes crossed the Hudson River by ferry to attend the First Presbyterian Church in Orange, New Jersey, where relatives of his mother were elders. It was on these visits that he met the woman who became his first wife, his cousin, Matilda Harrison, whom he married in 1813.

After his formal education ended, Randel was apprenticed, possibly as early as age 12 although more likely at 16, to Simeon De Witt, who was the Surveyor General of New York State. De Witt was familiar with Randel, as both families were from Albany, a city of only 7,500 at the time, and Randel's father had served with De Witt's brother in the American Revolution. It was a time in American history when many young men went into surveying, at least for a short time, as there was a great need for them as the empty places – empty of whites, anyway – began to become settled.

When Randel finished his apprenticeship and became an assistant surveyor, he interpreted the field reports of other surveyors to draft maps based on them of land in the Adirondack Mountains and on the Oneida Reservation, mapped the Albany Turnpike between Albany and Schenectady and the Great Western Turnpike from Albany to Cooperstown, and surveyed property lots in Albany and in Central New York, particularly Oneida County

== Mapping Manhattan ==
Despite his meager experience, through a recommendation by De Witt, one of three commissioners charged with developing a plan for the future layout of New York City's streets, and approval by Gouverneur Morris, one of the other commissioners and the unofficial president of the commission, Randel, at age 20, was hired to replace the commission's original chief surveyor, Charles Frederick Loss, who had proved to be incompetent.

Marguerite Holloway, Randel's biographer, divides his work in New York into three periods. The first, from 1808 to 1810, resulted in the 1811 publication of the Commissioners' Plan. Phase two ran from 1811 to 1817, during which he completed the necessary geodetic surveying and inscribed the grid into the land. The final phase was from around 1818 to 1821, when Randel and his first wife Matilda became high quality cartographers, makers of maps.

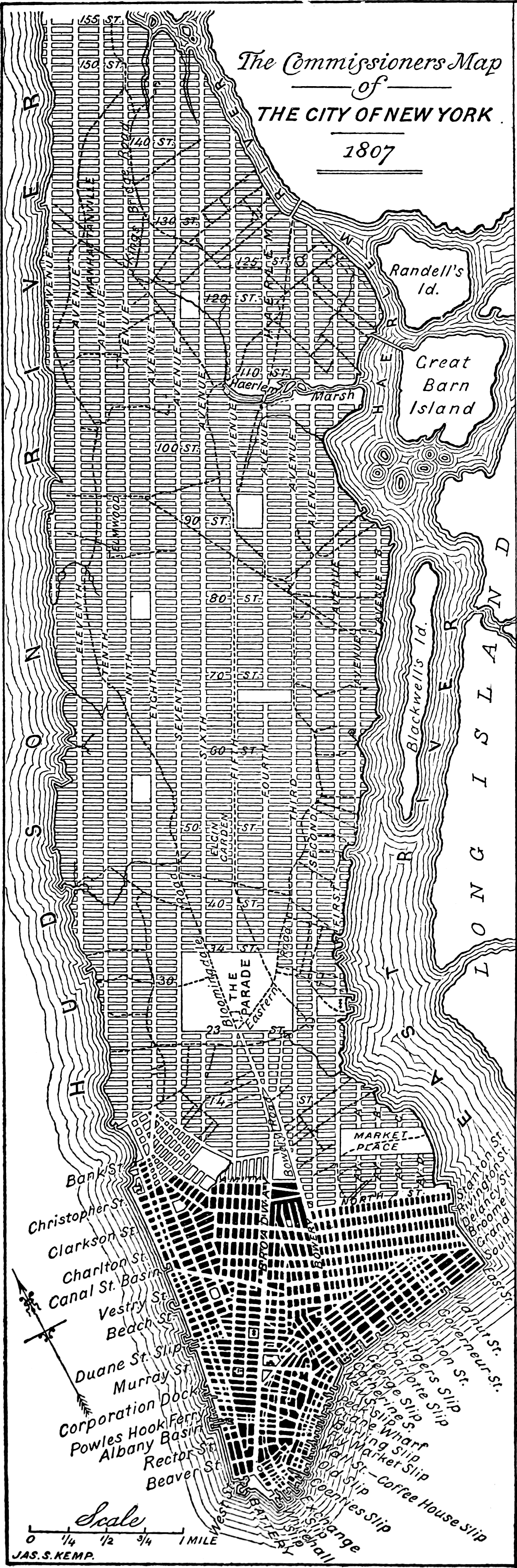
A modern redrawing of the 1807 version of the Commissioners' grid plan for Manhattan

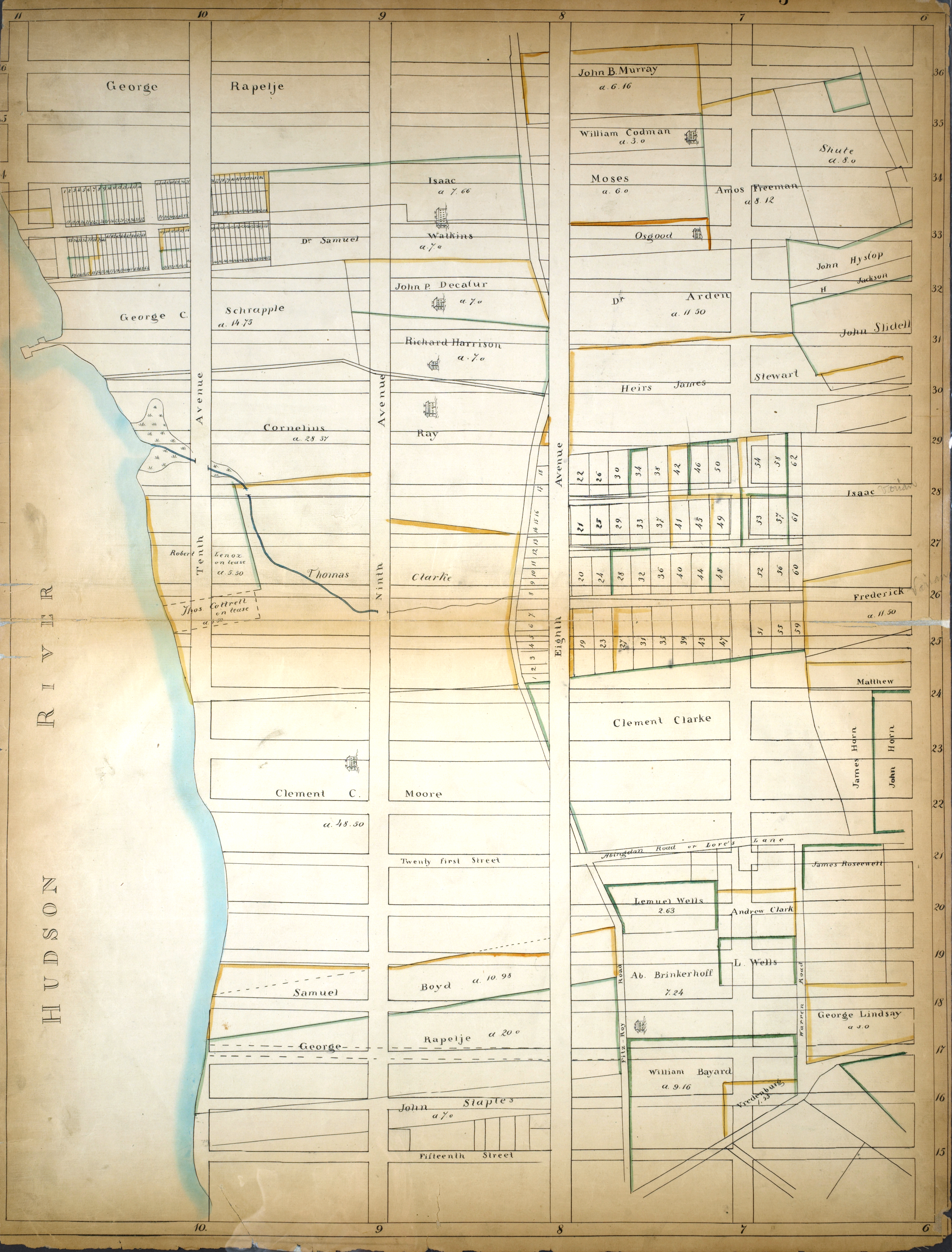
One of Randel's 92 detailed "Farm Maps", showing how the Manhattan grid would sit on the island's topography

Randel began work in June 1808, and was ordered to conduct a detailed survey of Manhattan Island to help produce the plan of New York City's future streets. The final map, the Commissioners' Plan of 1811, laid out the streets of New York from 14th Street to 155th Street into a rectangular grid, without accommodating the island's terrain.

After the publication of the Commissioners' Plan, at the instigation of the commission, Randel was retained by the Common Council of New York for the next 6 years continue the surveying necessary to lay down actual streets, as the Commissioners' Plan was more notional than practical.

To do this work, Randel was given an allocation of $1,000 for surveying instruments (equivalent to $19,000 in 2025), but he also spent his own money – between $2,400 (equivalent to $46,000 in 2025) and $3,000 (equivalent to $58,000 in 2025) – developing seven surveying instruments which, among other benefits, would not vary in size because of temperature changes, resulting in great precision. An expert in Colonial era surveying equipment has expressed the opinion, after closely examining images of Randel's new instruments – the pamphlet that explained them has been lost – that Randel was "Basically ... a mechanical genius." Commissioner Simeon De Witt said of Randel's work that it was made "with an accuracy not exceeded by any work of the kind in America."

To inscribe the grid onto the land, Randel and his staff erected almost 1,600 markers – primarily three-foot (0.91 m) long, nine-inch (23 cm) square marble monuments inscribed with the number of the street, placed at each intersection. Where rocks prevented the use of the marble markers, they blasted holes with gunpowder, poured in lead, and anchored six-inch (15 cm) long, one-inch (2.5 cm) square iron bolts. In all, they positioned 1,549 marble markers and 98 iron bolts to define the pattern of the grid.

As part of the third stage of his work, Randel created an extremely large map of the city, at an unprecedented scale. This was done by way of ninety-two 32-inch (81 cm) by 20-inch (51 cm) colored "Farm Maps" made at a scale of one hundred feet per inch (1.2 m/mm) that overlaid Manhattan's natural topography with the intended grid. When put together, the Farm Maps made a map of the city about 50 feet (15 m) long. It took Randel and his wife Matilda two years, from 1819 to 1820, to finish the maps, working from their new home, having moved to Orange, New Jersey. He needed, asked for, and received an extension from the Common Council to complete the task, and even then he did not quite make the deadline, delivering the last maps in September 1820, about four months late.

Randel's Farm Maps are praised for their accuracy and usefulness. Historian Isaac Newton Phelps Stokes, in his The Iconography of Manhattan Island, 1498-1909 called them "the most complete and valuable topographical record of the period that exists. It is, in fact, the only early topographical record of the island."

As well as the Farm Maps, Randel also produced an atlas of the city, filling in with "astounding precision" the details of street locations and elevations which had been left off the official map.

=== The map controversy ===
There was a controversy about the publication of the map of the Commissioners' Plan. Randel had begun to prepare a map to go to the engraver, using his original papers, when he found out that the council had given William Bridges, one of the handful of city-recognized surveyors, the right to do so. Bridges simply copied one of Randel's previously published maps, which were in the public domain, introducing errors as he did so. Bridges published and copyrighted the resulting map as a private venture, leaving Randel out in the cold.

The Commissioners of the 1811 Plan

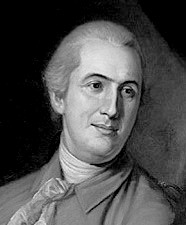
Gouverneur Morris

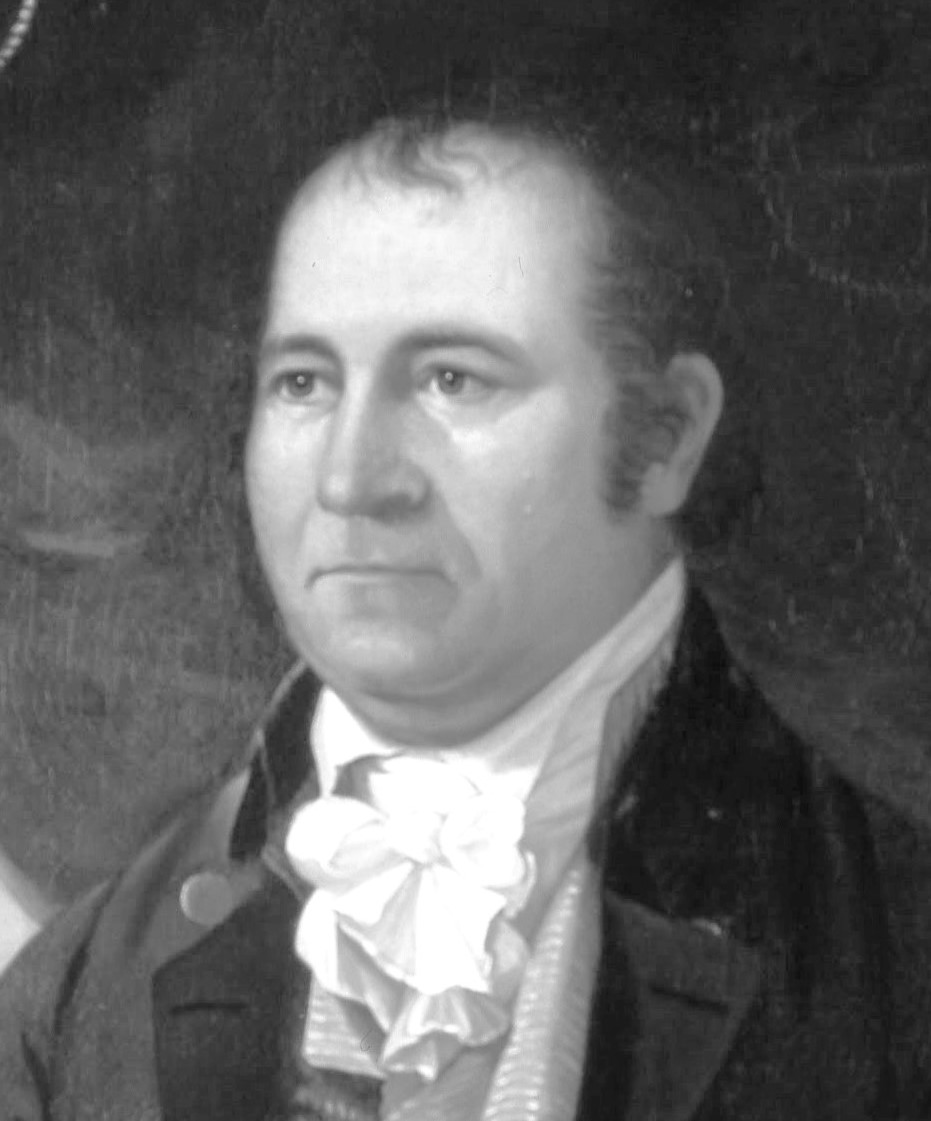
Simeon De Witt

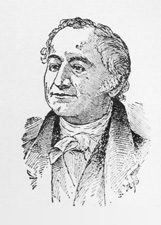
John Rutherfurd

The conflict between the two men did not come to a head until three years later, in 1814, when Randel started advertising his own version of the Commissioners' Plan map, which he said was "more correct" then the previously published one – he did not mention Bridges by name – not only because of the errors he claimed had crept into the map when Bridges copied it, but because he, Randel, "has since completed the measurements and fixed monuments by contract with the [Common Council], [therefore] he alone is possessed of all the materials for this valuable work." He published a letter from Gouverneur Morris, who called Randel's map "an excellent work ... indispensable to those who wish to make themselves acquainted with the Topography of that interesting space which is comprizes [sic]. It appears to me more accurate than anything of the kind which has yet appeared. ... I consider it highly deserving of public patronage." Bridges shot back, commenting that Randel was "unprincipled" and "conceited", and lacking in "honorable conduct". Randel responded, listing many, but not all, of the errors in Bridges' map, including islands that were not the right length or width or were in the wrong place, rocks and hills misplaced and mis-sized, rivers and forts too close to each other, missing and misplaced buildings, and streets shown as closed that were not. Bridges, whose reputation both as a surveyor and as a man was far from clean, did not reply, perhaps because his wife was sick at the time, and died several months after Randel's second letter. In any case, Bridges himself died shortly after that, and Randel did not publish his map or have it engraved, due to national security concerns connected with the War of 1812. He eventually published it in 1821. Randel's future litigious behavior may have been founded on his being wronged in not receiving what he felt was the proper credit for his work on the Manhattan map.

When Randel returned to the New York City map project, he had a new idea about it: the map of the city would be integrated into a map of the Northeastern United States. In need of money – the Panic of 1819 was in effect, and the only work given to Randel by New York City was a survey of the Brooklyn Navy Yard – Randel hoped that the unusual new map would bring in some cash. He cleared the project with his mentor, Simeon De Witt, whose map of New York state was highly praised, and engaged noted engraver Peter Maverick. When it was published in 1821, it included a large-scale map of Philadelphia that scrolled over Brooklyn and Queens, while the map of Manhattan scrolled over the map of the states of Connecticut, Rhode Island and part of Massachusetts. New York state directly north of the city was also shown up to the longitude of Connecticut's northern border. While beautiful and innovative, and praised at the time for its accuracy and arrangement, the map was not a financial success, nor was the Common Council satisfied at the small scale at which Manhattan was shown. They bought 24 copies of the map, and then engaged another mapmaker for a larger scale map which could be more easily utilized. Randel wrote to the mayor that he would attempt to make a map of twice the size, but never did. In fact, the map was the only engraved map he was to make in his lifetime: his earlier maps of the Commissioner's Plan and his Farm Maps were done by hand. Only a single copy of the map remains, in the Library of Congress. (Note: A color reproduction of the map can be seen in Ballon, Hilary, ed. (2013). The Greatest Grid: The Master Plan of Manhattan 1811-2011. New York: Museum of the City of New York and Columbia University Press. p. 43. ISBN 978-0-231-15990-6.)

== Upstate and other projects ==
Even while in the midst of his work on Manhattan, Randel engaged in other projects. In September 1810, for instance, he measured the Albany Post Road from Albany to New York City, finding it to be 154 miles long. Randel also suggested changes to the road to make it shorter, which later altered postage rates between the cities by one-third. He produced a 23-foot (7.0 m) long map of the road, which showed it entering into an already gridded New York City. Between 1811 and 1822, Randel's projects included work in Oswego, Oneida, and Oneida Castle, New York; the Salt Springs Reservation in Onondaga, New York; the New Military Tract; islands in the St. Lawrence River; and the upper Hudson River, where he had been hired by merchants interested in building a canal from Albany to New Baltimore, New York to avoid the river's hazards in that area.

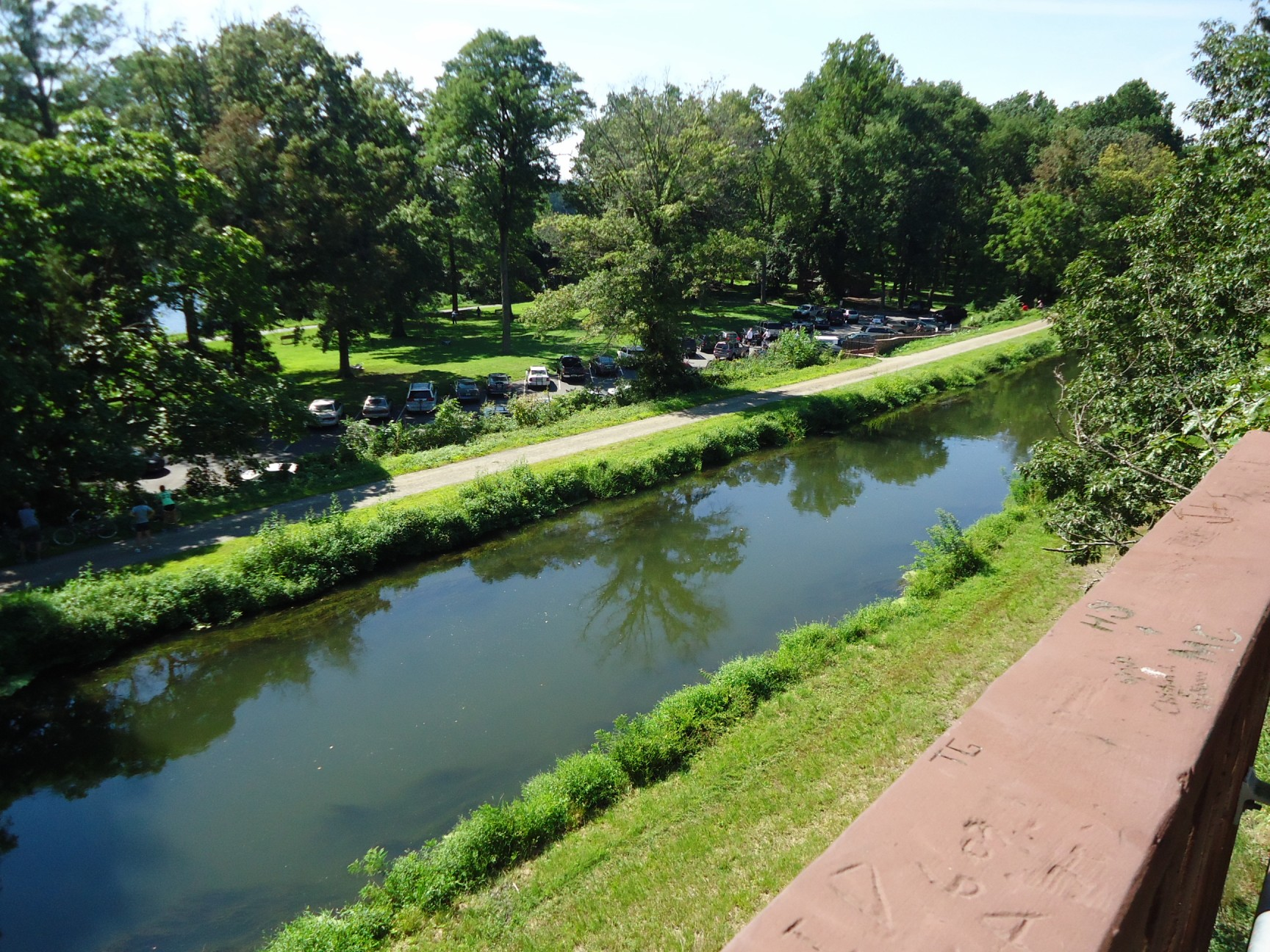
Part of the Delaware & Raritan Canal, which Randel was hired to survey a route for c.1816, as seen in 2013

In 1815, Randel was engaged by the Committee of Surveys of the city government of Albany to do a survey. Randel wrote that he was returning to New York City to get his equipment, and asked that monuments be ready when he returned. In 1816, the committee voided the contract, citing the delay in Randel starting the work. Randel was incensed, writing in one of his field books all he had done to prepare for the job, including constructing new instruments, at the cost to himself of $6,461.47 (equivalent to $120,000 in 2025). By 1819 he had determined that he would get no relief from the Albany government, and he filed suit against the members of the committee for not honoring the contract. He lost the case, but it did not cure him of the inclination to use the courts when he felt slighted or taken advantage of: it was the first in a long line of lawsuits that Randel would file over the rest of his life.

At some point, Randel bought two lots in upstate New York, among many that he had purchased for himself and his family, including a house in Albany. Lots 71 and 74 of the tract known as the First Pagan Purchase may have been the sites where Randel and his brother Abraham started farms near to each other. Randel ran his through trusted caretakers, although he was involved via correspondence with decisions concerning the running of the farm. He also acted as an agent for Abraham in selling hops in New York City. After 1810, the fiscal responsibilities connected to the properties he owned began to weigh on him.

Around 1816, John Rutherfurd, the third of the Commissioners of the 1811 Plan, hired Randel to survey a route for the proposed Delaware & Raritan Canal between the Delaware and Raritan Rivers. This Randel did, estimating water flows with the aid of a millwright. In 1819 he drew up plans for a 19-mile (31 km) route for a canal to carry ships and sloops from Albany.

== After Manhattan ==
=== The Erie Canal controversy ===
Shortly after his work on the Delaware & Raritan Canal, Randel received an offer to be the engineer for the eastern third of the Erie Canal, from Utica, New York to the Hudson River. Randel turned down this offer, perhaps expecting that he would be given the job of chief engineer on the Delaware & Raritan, but political considerations held up that project, which was not built until 1830–34. In the meantime, Randel relocated to his home in Albany, where, in 1821, a local lawyer asked Randel to cheaply and informally ("without instruments") survey a route for the eastern part of the Erie Canal, which would soon reach nearby Schenectady. Randel completed his survey, devised what he thought was the best route for the canal to take – which included a tunnel, a novelty in the U.S. at the time – delivered the results to the Erie Canal Commission, and published them as well. The Commissioners had not yet made a final decision on the route the canal would take in that area, and they later rebuked Randel for publishing his proposed route while a decision was still pending.

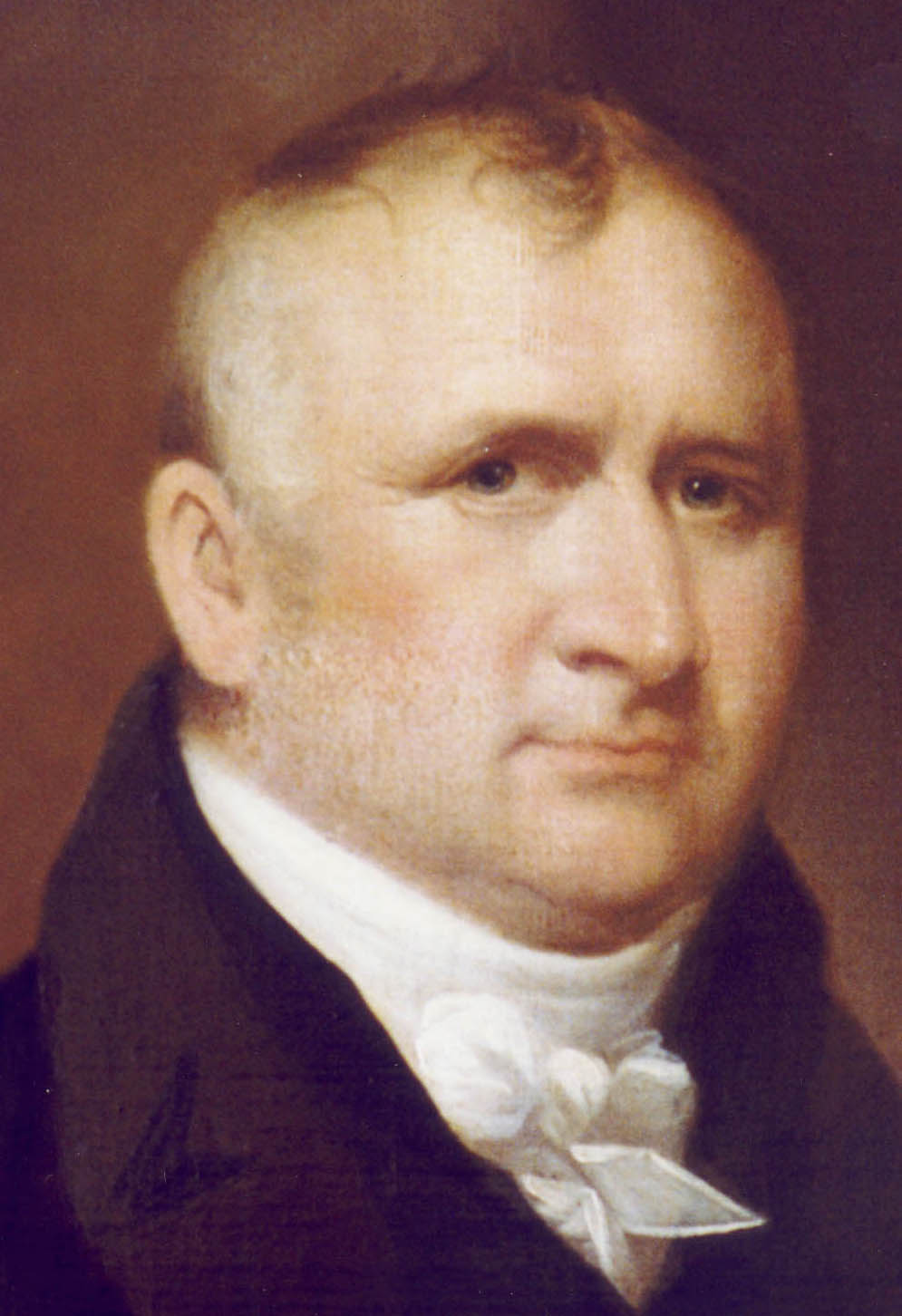
Benjamin Wright

Randel met with Benjamin Wright, the future "Father of American Civil Engineering", who was then the chief engineer for the central part of the canal. Wright was reviewing all the proposed routes, and Randel wanted to go over his proposed route, which Wright had apparently not seen before. Some days later Randel obtained some of Wright's calculations on the cost of soil removal, which he disputed, telling Wright so in a letter, and informing him that he planned on publishing his concerns.

When the Commissioners finally made their decision, the route they had decided on was not Randel's. Whether he was the author is not known, but a series of letters from "A Friend of the Canal" were published in a local newspaper, complaining that the process by which the route had been determined was closed: in modern terms, it was not "transparent". When the Commissioners publicly released their final report and plan, the newspaper stopped publishing the letters. Randel then published a 72-page pamphlet arguing that the route chosen by the Erie Canal Commission was made for political reasons, with evidence provided that the final route was not the best one, and detailed ideas for methods for building the section of the canal.

Modern authorities differ on what Randel's motivation was for upping the ante on the debate, or whether there were multiple reasons. It appears unlikely that Randel would have published the pamphlet if he had not believed in his figures or that his route was truly the most cost-effective, and yet he had been commissioned by representatives of Albany, including the mayor, to make a survey, and Randel's proposed route favored Albany over Troy, New York. Further, Simeon De Witt, Randel's mentor and a powerful man in Albany, had paid for the publication of the pamphlet. There is no doubt that Randel's route favored Albany over Troy, but much doubt about whether he deliberately, or unconsciously, decided on such a route. On the other hand, whether Wright was deliberately favoring Troy is also debatable.

Although Randel had evidence to back up his charges, they came to nothing, and had the long-term effect of making Wright his professional enemy.

=== The Chesapeake & Delaware Canal ===
A modern map of the Chesapeake & Delaware Canal

Perhaps because of the notoriety which came to him due to the Erie Canal controversy, in 1822 Randel was engaged as a consultant to the Chesapeake & Delaware Canal. The 20-mile (32 km) long canal, which would cut across the northern neck of the Delmarva Peninsula, connecting the Delaware Bay and Chesapeake Bay and cutting 300 miles off the trip between Baltimore and Philadelphia, was proposed as early as 1661. Work on the canal had actually started in 1804, supervised by Benjamin H. Latrobe, but stopped a year later due to lack of funds, politics, and topographical and labor problems. In 1822, the re-organized canal company's board of directors engaged William Strickland, an architect and civil engineer, to re-examine the route that had originally been chosen for the canal. Strickland made a slight change, but otherwise deemed the original plan to be sound, however the board of directors was not certain. They asked New York governor DeWitt Clinton to recommend an engineer, and based on this they hired Benjamin Wright to be the canal's chief engineer. They also engaged Randel to review the canal's route, and the previously suggested one which had been passed over.

After examining all the routes, Randel decided that the best one was not the "upper route" that Latrobe had chosen and Strickland had confirmed, but instead the "southern route", which was more technically challenging in that it would have to go through an 80-foot (24 m) ridge, and required a "deep cut", which was harder to do, but would have the advantage of opening the canal to the Atlantic Ocean, assuring it of always having enough water, a problem which the company and its staff had worried about solving. Latrobe and Strickland both thought that the soil where the deep cut was necessary would make a canal there extremely difficult and expensive to build, but Randel disagreed, estimating that the cost of such a "tidewater canal" would be $1.2 million dollars; this estimate was based on the soil there being a gravelly loam. As it turned out, the soil was actually spongy and marsh-like, which added another $1 million to the cost. (Note: Randel's exact estimate was $1,211.834.74, but the canal actually cost 82% more, coming in at $2,201,864. A consulting board of engineers had estimated the cost at $1,354.364.64. Gray, pp. 51,51n)

The company asked the U.S. Army's Board of Engineers – the precursor to the Army Corps of Engineers – to evaluate both routes, and at the same time hired Randel's brother, William, to take samples and test the soil along both routes. Wright, the chief engineer, was keeping his options open, but was somewhat predisposed to favor the original upper route over Randel's suggested southern route.

Randel's work on the canal was interrupted in 1823 by numerous personal problems. His wife, Matilda, had fallen sick early in the year, and eventually died in August. Then Randel's father died in October. Randel himself was ill during this period, although he did not allow his own illness to get in the way of the work on the canal. Nevertheless, he was away from the project for several periods of time in 1823, and the decision about the route could not be arrived at until the Army engineers – actually a committee consisting of Brigadier General Simon Bernard and Lieutenant Colonel Joseph G. Totten from the Army Board, Canvass White, the chief engineer of the Pennsylvania State Works, and Wright – could meet with Randel. This finally happened in the winter, and in January 1824, the Army and the canal company unexpectedly announced that they had chosen Randel's southern route, a choice that was published on January 31, 1824.

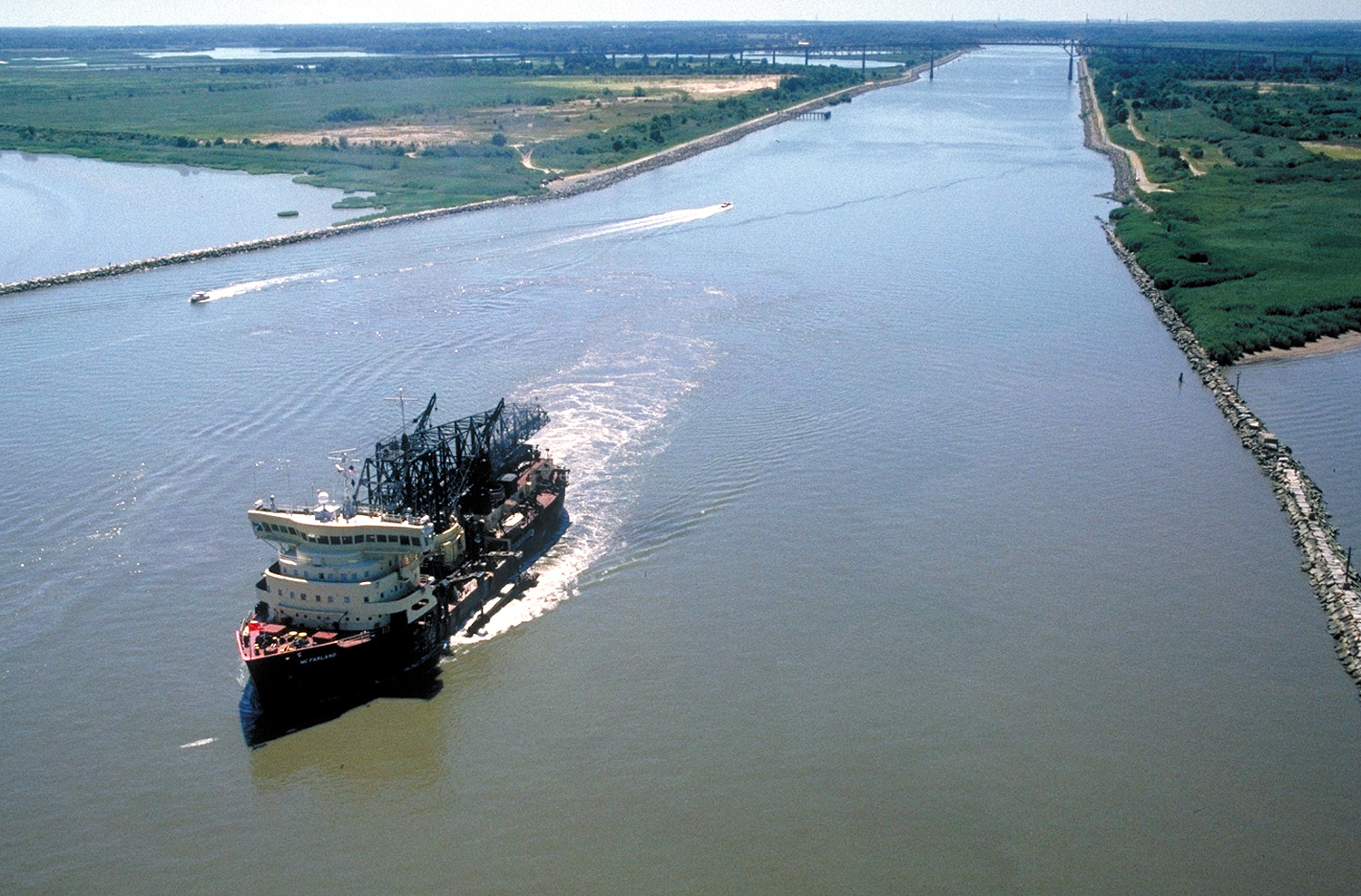
The eastern end of the Canal

Randel was hired as an engineer – his responsibility would be the eastern half of the canal, which included the "deep cut" and the 80-foot ridge, as well as bogs and marshland – and signed his contract on March 26. Since Wright was the chief engineer, Randel was his subordinate. Randel was given a deadline of four years to complete his section. He immediately advertised for and hired hundreds of workers, and commenced digging in April. As was usual for the time, Randel was paid a salary, out of which he paid his workforce, but Wright and the board of directors reduced the salary to the point that it would no longer cover the cost of labor, and Randel was forced to go into his own funds to pay the men, driving himself further into debt than he already was. One of the canal company board members, Paul Beck Jr., knowing of the injustice that was being done to Randel, and that Randel was paying out five times more than the canal was paying him, resigned from the board, later saying "[I]t was manifest to me that [Randel's] ruin was inevitable, and I did not choose to be accessory to it ... I believed that the board was governed by Wright, and that he had determined to ruin Randel."

Randel did not allow either his illness or the injustice being perpetrated on him by Wright to stop work on the canal. He continued through the winter of 1824 and the following summer. Randel may have realized that Wright was trying to get him fired and ruin his reputation, and that the best way of avoiding this was to achieve the excellent results for which he was noted. Wright, however, did not stop his campaign against Randel. As the chief engineer, he was empowered to assess Randel's work, and, after inspecting it, he filed a report on July 30, 1825 which said that Randel was neglecting his duties, and had not moved a sufficient amount of soil. In later courtroom testimony, this was determined to be an outright lie, and it was also determined that Wright had ordered his assistant to lie, and that at least one member of the canal company's board was aware of the lie and had approved specifically of what Wright was doing. When word of Wright's assessment reached Randel's workforce, there was agitation among the men, so much so that one of the engineers went to the board to inquire whether they were about to fire Randel, but the board denied it. Nevertheless, Randel was officially notified on September 10 of Wright's assessment of neglect of duty. He requested details from the board, but was refused, until September 19, when they met with Randel, who was given 10 days to prepare a defense despite his being ill at the time. The day after Randel read his defense to the board – they had refused to allow another engineer to do so because of Randel's condition – the board fired Randel, despite a report from two board members contradicting Wright's report, and certifying that 700 men were employed by Randel on September 27. The company also filed a lawsuit against Randel to recover money which had been loaned to him, loans which had been necessitated because Randel's fees had been reduced below the point where he could pay his subcontractors: for instance, one month Randel was paid $636 for the month, while employing as many as 100 men at a total cost of $2,500.

=== The lawsuit ===
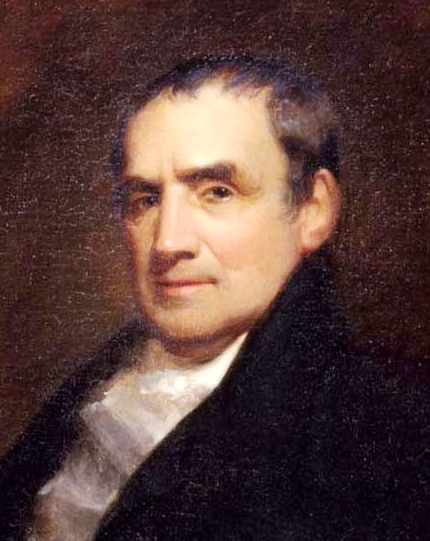
Mathew Carey by painter John Neagle (1825)

Randel filed lawsuits against the canal company for breach of contract and against Wright individually. The suit against Wright was eventually ruled as invalid, the court ruling that the dispute was actually between Randel and the company.

In the meantime, Mathew Carey, who had been the prime mover in getting the building of the canal started again in the 1820s, came to Randel's defense. He considered the company's treatment of the surveyor-engineer as "unconscionable" and published a number of statements and tracts defending him, starting just a week after Randel was let go. In his publications, Carey point out that Randel had spent $13,639 (equivalent to $390,000 in 2025) of his own money to pay his workers once Wright and the company reduced his pay, and had worked for 9 months without pay. Carey also pointed out that the entire crew, including Randel, had courted disease and bad health by working throughout the winter in a frozen marsh, as demanded by the company, and that there was a better case for neglect of duty against Wright, who had spent most of the spring and summer surveying other canals. Wright indeed indicated in his letters to friends that he feared working in unhealthy conditions, and indeed had absented himself similarly while working on the Erie Canal. Furthermore, although Randel had a four-year contract with the canal to build his section, at the time he was fired he had [completed?] 43% of the job, in only a little over a year. In fact, after the canal company fired Randel, they advanced the opening date of the canal a full year, to March 1827.

Carey's publications culminated in the 23-page Exhibit of the shocking oppression and injustice suffered for sixteen months by John Randel, Jun. Esq. However spirited Carey's defense of Randel was, in the end it came to nothing, as the board steadfastly refused to answer his charges, and Carey was unable to call a meeting of the stockholders to air the issues.

Randel's suit against the company was heard in Delaware, as one of the two states which would charge tolls for the canal, in 1833, delays having occurred due to jurisdictional problems. Preparation for the trial put Randel even further into debt: at times he had four clerks working for him. The run-up to the trial took considerable time, as both sides filed multiple pleas and demurrers, even after the court forcefully told both parties that enough was enough. Finally, on December 9, a jury was empaneled and the trial proper began. Opening arguments took more than two weeks to complete, and numerous witnesses testified; Benjamin Wright, however, was not among them. After a deliberation which took four days, the jury returned an award to Randel of $226,885.84 in 1834 (equivalent to $7,000,000 in 2025), a tremendous amount for that time.

When the company could not pay the judgment, Randel, supported by the state of Delaware and especially the authorities of New Castle County, announced that he would attach the canal's tolls. The company had secretly told boat captains that they could pay their tolls either at the company's office in Pennsylvania, which was not legal according to the canal's charter, or at the Maryland end of the canal. This was an obvious subterfuge to avoid Randel attaching the tolls in Delaware, where he had been awarded the judgement. Nevertheless, the captains found themselves having to pay twice, once to the company, and a second time to Randel. Hundreds of the captains who refused to pay Randel's agent, William Linn Brown, were jailed by the local sheriff, and then bailed out by the company. The canal company, using two such captains as proxies, sued Randel, but the Delaware Superior Court found against them.

At this point, the canal company appealed to the Supreme Court of the United States not only the most recent ruling regarding Randel's attachments, but also the original judgment of award. Unfortunately for the company, the Supreme Court upheld both verdicts. The decision has been called "one of the most famous lawsuits" in the history of the state of Delaware. In 1834, finally, nine years after he had been fired, Randel received his payment, but not until the state governments of both Maryland and Delaware passed laws requiring the canal company to pay its debts within five years. The award almost put the company into bankruptcy, not to mention the loss of income stemming from boat captains who avoided using the canal so as not to get involved in the garnishment war between Randel and the canal company.

The final chapter in the long saga occurred when Randel accused William Linn Brown, his longtime loyal associate and the man charged with receiving the attached tolls from the canal, of taking $1000 from him, as well as power-of-attorney documents. Randel sued Brown, and Brown counter-sued. Randel lost the case at the state level in Pennsylvania in 1841, but his appeal to the Supreme Court was successful in 1844. Many of Randel's friends and associates felt that the affair did not reflect well on him.

== After the canal ==
Between 1825 and 1834, while the court case was making its way through the legal system, Randel continued to work. Also, in June 1827, Randel remarried. His bride was Letitia Massey, the daughter of Philadelphia shipping merchant John Massey, and an educated woman – she attended the first school for women in the United States, the Bethlehem Female Seminary, which is now Moravian College. Letitia was to be a confidant, advisor and ally for Randel during his various litigations and business dealings, sometimes overseeing the work of Randel's assistants when he was not available to do so. The couple had at least three children, two sons and a daughter, and possible a third son. Of these only one survived to adulthood, the rest died as infants or young children.

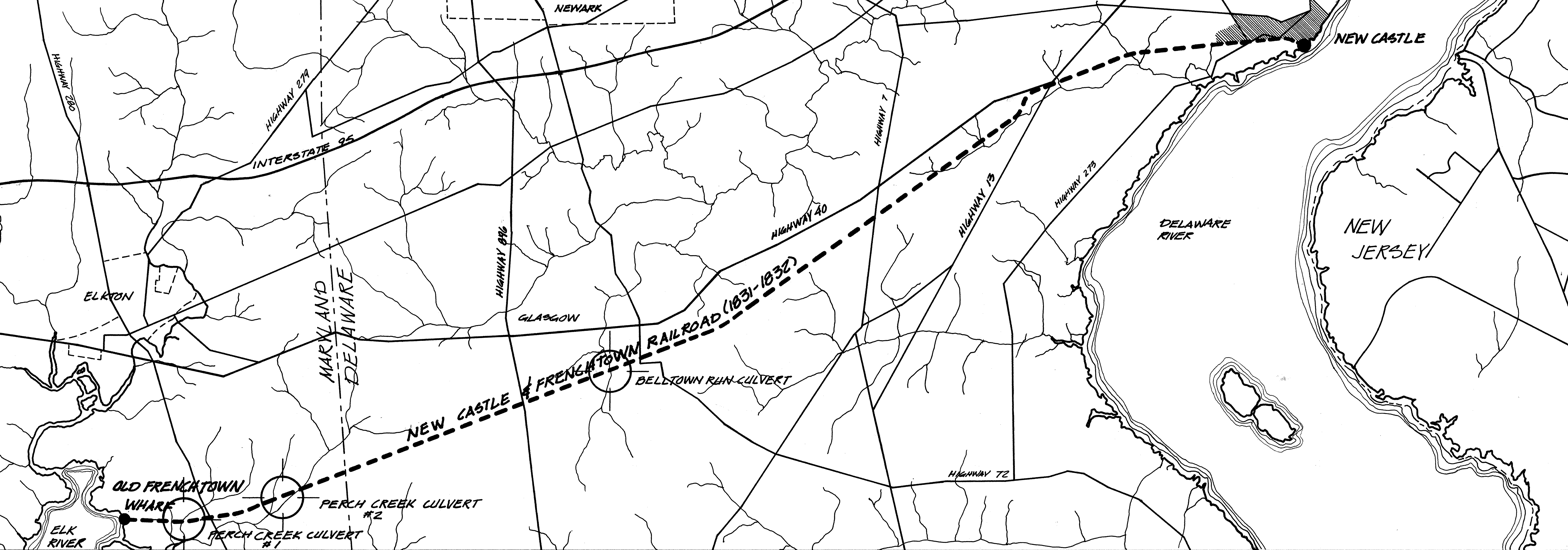
A modern map of the route of the New Castle & Frenchtown Railroad

In 1827, Randel embarked on what was to be his last canal-related engagement, when he surveyed a 170-mile (270 km) route along the Susquehanna North Branch through difficult territory. Randel's next engagements were to be with the emerging railroad industry, beginning in 1830 when he was made chief engineer of the New Castle & Frenchtown Railroad, "one of the first general-purpose railroads in the United States" which would be a direct competitor to the Chesapeake & Delaware Canal, and Delaware's first railroad. The road took two years to build, and cut the travel time significantly. Still, contemporary experts have judged that the building of the railroad by the inexperienced Randel, overseen by the inexperienced board of directors, was "unprofessional and haphazard".

Randel also worked as the chief engineer on the Ithaca and Owego Railroad, which was also completed in two years; the Central Rail Road of Georgia, a brief engagement when Randel proposed a route which the board of directors did not favor; a proposed Delaware Rail Road Company; and the New-York & Albany. He also did a survey for a railroad for the Lykens Valley Coal Company in Pennsylvania, and a topographical and hydrological survey for the city of Baltimore, which wanted to improve its source of drinking water, however Randel was not hired to construct the system, which the city determined was too expensive.

== Life in Randelia ==
With his settlement from the canal company, Randel built "Randelia", (Note: Sometimes referred to as "Randalia", with an "a" instead of an "e".) an estate in Cecil County, Maryland, just west of Chesapeake City, Maryland, and just south of the mouth of the Chesapeake and Delaware Canal, which was 1,415-acre (573 ha) at its largest extent. (Note: Randel bought some of the original land from James A. Bayard Jr., the chief counsel for the Chesapeake & Delaware Canal Company in Randel's lawsuit against the company. Holloway, p.246) There, he lived out most of the rest of his life, writing letters to newspapers in search of recognition for his work on the Manhattan grid – which he called "the pride and boast of [New York City]" – developing a plan for the extension of the grid above 155th Street; and working on other ideas.

Although work did not always come Randel's way, he never stopped coming up with new ideas, such as the elevated railway, which he tried to develop well before they became a reality. Randel, who claimed to have thought of the idea of elevated trains in 1829, attempted to get permission from New York City's Board of Aldermen – the Common Council's name since 1831 – to build an elevated railway on Broadway. A committee of three evaluated the proposal, and had positive things to report about it, but recommended taking a cautious approach to such a sweeping change. They asked for models and further description and details, which Randel provided them after commissioning a cast-iron one-tenth scale model in Philadelphia at the cost of $4,000 (equivalent to $140,000 in 2025) to $5,000 (equivalent to $180,000 in 2025). He invited Broadway business owners and their families to see the model, which was on display at 413 Broadway, and received positive press coverage. Randel's design was similar to the cable cars in San Francisco in that the trains were pulled by an endless loop of rope. There would be four lines, two uptown and two downtown, one a local and one an express each way, in a closed loop from Bowling Green to Union Square, a distance of about 3 miles (4.8 km) in each direction. Despite the great care displayed by Randel in dealing with every detail of the system, from sanitation to the privacy of those in residences along the line, the Board of Aldermen rejected Randel's idea.

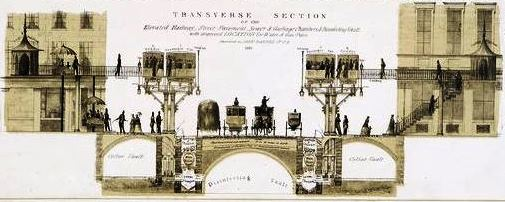
Randel's plan for an elevated train on Broadway

Randel did not let the rejection stop him. He got the Mechanics Institute to examine his proposal and make their evaluation public, got clearance from the chief engineer of the fire department, and altered the model slightly and re-presented it to the Board of Aldermen. He showed the model at an American Institute fair in Castle Garden and displayed a new model of the elevated railway at the New York Crystal Palace in 1853. Unfortunately for Randel, none of these efforts ended in a contract with the city to build his proposed system; it did, however, get him involved in more litigation. Randel also made a proposal to the Board for a railroad and roadway to be built above the wharves and encircle the city, which he called "The City Belt Railway and Depot" and "The City Belt Avenue", which he imagined to be about 28 miles (45 km) long. This plan the aldermen liked better, but still nothing came of it.

Filing lawsuits against numerous people, as well as being sued by others, was nothing new for Randel. His lawsuits were often about money Randel thought he was owed, or debts that he was not able to pay. But some of the legal actions seem to have been simply frivolous, such as when Randel lost a piece of jewelry and had all the workers on the estate looking for it, until someone showed up claiming to have found the pin by the river. Randel attempted to have a grand jury indict the man, but the case was dismissed. It seems clear the Randel saw the legal system as a cure-all for every problem, large or small.

Work dried up for him, owing in part to his litigious nature but also to his increasing eccentricity and self-righteousness. Even with his mentor, Simeon De Witt, to whom he owed much, Randel could be petty and avaricious. In the early 1820s, Randel had taken some field books of a survey done for the state, which were therefore state property, and would not return them when De Witt asked him to, giving, for years, various excuses as to why he could not do so. De Witt died in 1834, with Randel still not having returned the books, and it took De Witt's successor as Surveyor General of New York, Orville L. Holley, until 1839, and sending an assistant surveyor to Randelia to pressure Randel in person, to get the books back. In the process, Randel received some surveying work for the state in Syracuse.

Randel attempted to make Randelia an estate that would endure after his death, but a contemporary claimed that Randel was "strange and eccentric, full of Utopian schemes and projects", and had spent his money on "the prosecution of wild, chimerical schemes for self-aggrandizement", although one of Randel's descendants described him as a "visionary, trying to make the world a better place".

Randel's last known letter was to Secretary of State John M. Clayton, (Note: Clayton was one of the lawyers representing the Chesapeake & Delaware Canal Company in Randel's lawsuit against the company. Gray, p. 92) dated June 22, 1849. In it, he extolled the virtues of a northern extension of New York City he was designing, to be called "Morrisania" after Gouveneur Morris' estate. The city would have 200-foot (61 m) wide avenues with 80-foot (24 m) wide park-like medians. Randel told Clayton that Morrisania would be "the most beautiful and comfortable suburban City you could desire to see." Randel's true reason for writing Clayton, though was that he was in need of employment and urged the Secretary to think of him when work came up for which Randel would be qualified.

Whatever the reason – lack of work, non-payment of fees that were owed him, or money spent on impractical schemes – Randel was clearly in financial trouble, seeking to sell off many of his assets by the early 1850s. He and his wife Letitia attempted to protect some of their property from attachment by putting it in a trust for her administered by their son. Unfortunately, some of the land included was already mortgaged to someone else. In 1854, they put the estate up for sale, but because of the encumbrances, they did not receive much money from the land they could sell. Another strange event, a lawsuit filed in New York in 1856 in which Letitia sued Randel through her trustee, their son, for $1,390, may have been intended to scare off creditors. In 1858, some of their possessions were seized by Cecil County to pay off longstanding debts owed to a neighbor; several months later, their son, John M Randel, died at the age of 27, possibly from yellow fever. In 1859, Randel and Letitia filed a lawsuit in Maryland the intent of which was to get back some of their land. When they lost the case they again appealed to the Supreme Court, which rejected it, saying that it "lacked definition".

Randel tried once again in 1863 to interest the New York City Board of Aldermen in a project. He offered to make a series of 1,472 maps of Manhattan at a scale 16 times larger than the Farm Maps. The Board seemed interested, and at first recommended hiring Randel, but eventually, even with the backing of mayor Charles Godfrey Gunther, the petition failed to be approved. The city clerk, David T. Valentine, nonetheless convinced Randel to write a 10-page essay about his work on the Manhattan grid, "City of New York, north of Canal street, in 1808 to 1821", which is the only narrative by Randel on the subject.

"I am a ruined man", Randel had written at the age of 48, while still trying to collect his judgment from the Chesapeake & Delaware Canal Company, and when he died of "brain inflammation" – possibly encephalitis or typhus – on August 2, 1865 in Albany at the age of 77, he was insolvent. His grave has not been located, but it is said that he was buried in the First Presbyterian Church of Orange where he married his first wife, Mathilda; Letitia went to live with Randel's nephew in New Jersey. The property that had been called "Randelia" is still farmland, and as of 2013, Randel's house, expanded and modernized, is still extant.

== Professional associations ==
At various times in his life Randel was a member of the Albany Society for the Promotion of Useful Arts, the American Association for the Advancement of Science, the American Institute of the City of New York, and the Franklin Institute of Philadelphia. In 1815, he was asked to give several lectures on mnemonics, and probably possessed an eidetic (or "photographic") memory.
