= Jollain (engravers) =

French engraver family

Jollain (also spelled Jolin and Iollain) was the name of a family of French engravers and engraving publishers who lived and worked in the 17th and 18th centuries, mainly in Paris. Their engravings were often published under the name Chez Jollain (English: House of Jollain). The atelier Jollain was responsible for the first engraving of harpsichord music in France.

== Family members ==
Gérard Jollain (first mentioned 1660, buried 28 May 1683) was a copper engraver. Bénézit gives his name as Gérard Jolin (or Jollain) and says he resided on the Rue Saint-Jacques in Paris under the shop sign Ville de Cologne and was the father of François-Gérard Jollain (next).

François Jollain (ca. 1641 – 18 April 1704) was a copper engraver. Bénézit gives his name as François-Gérard Jolin (or Jollain) l'ainé (the elder) and says he was a graveur au burin (a burin is a type of engraving tool), primarily of portraits, and the son of Gérard Jolin (previous). "He was cited in February 1697 as a marchand graveur juré, mouleur de bois (sworn merchant engraver, caster of wood)."

Jacques Jollain (first mentioned 1679) was a copper engraver. Bénézit gives his name as Jacques Jolin le jeune (the young) and also describes him as a graveur au burin, who did portraits and resided in Paris during the 17th and 18th centuries.

François-Gérard Jollain (first mentioned 1684, last mentioned 1719) was an engraver.

Gérard Jollain (first mentioned 1704, last mentioned 1719) was a copper engraver.

== Gallery ==
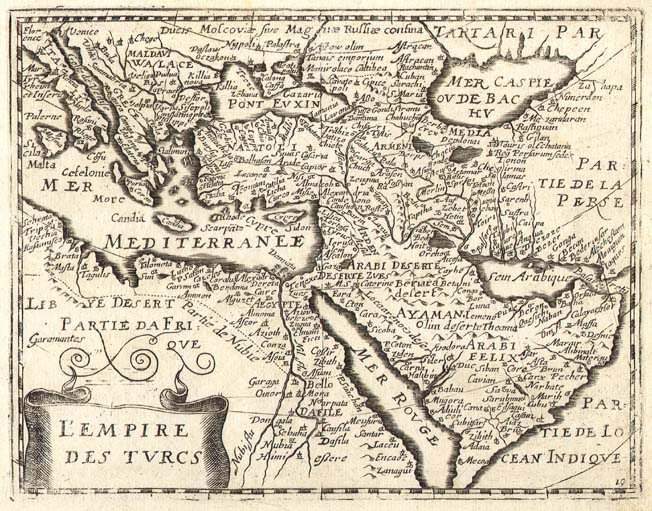
Map of the Turkish Empire (1667)

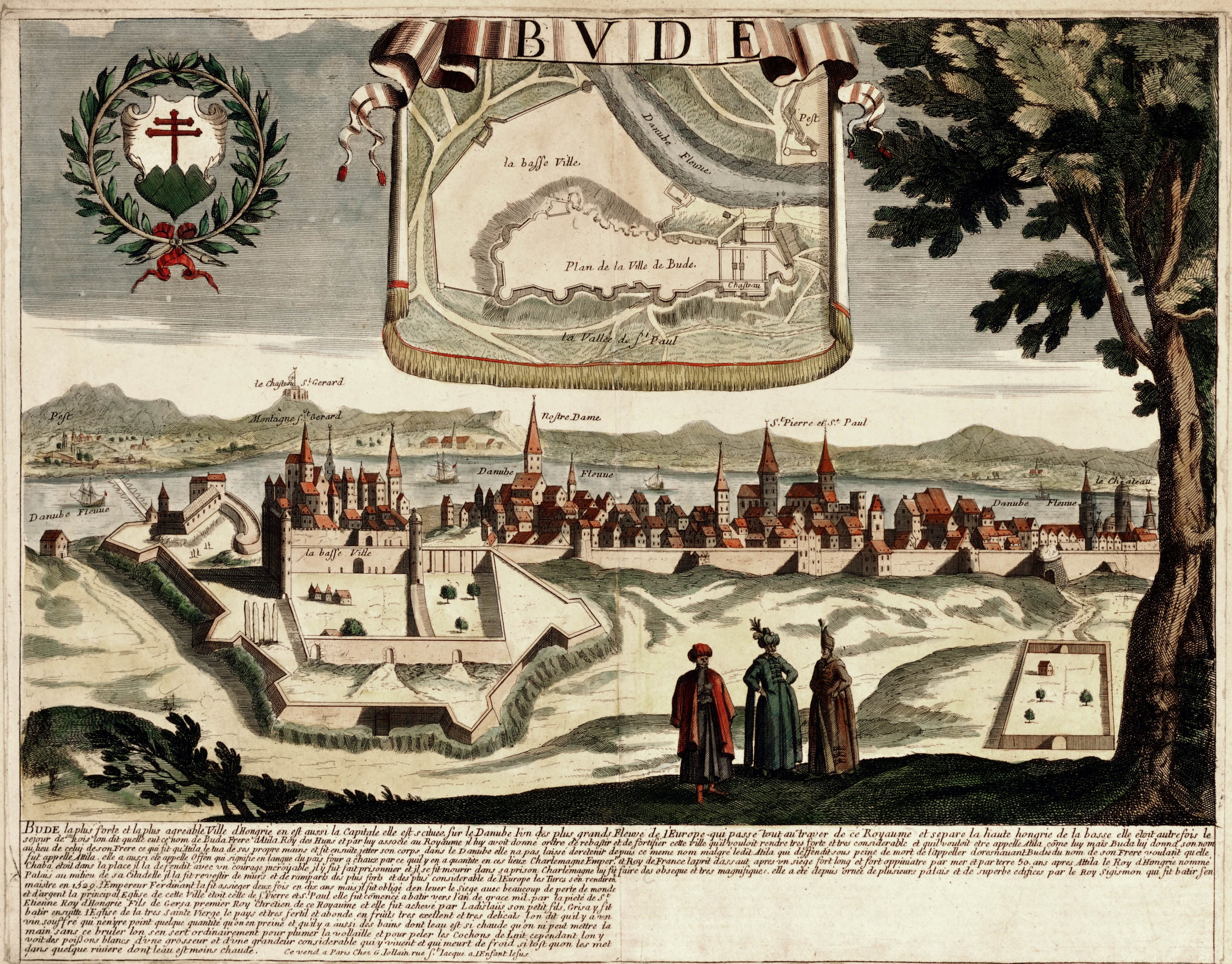
View and map of Buda

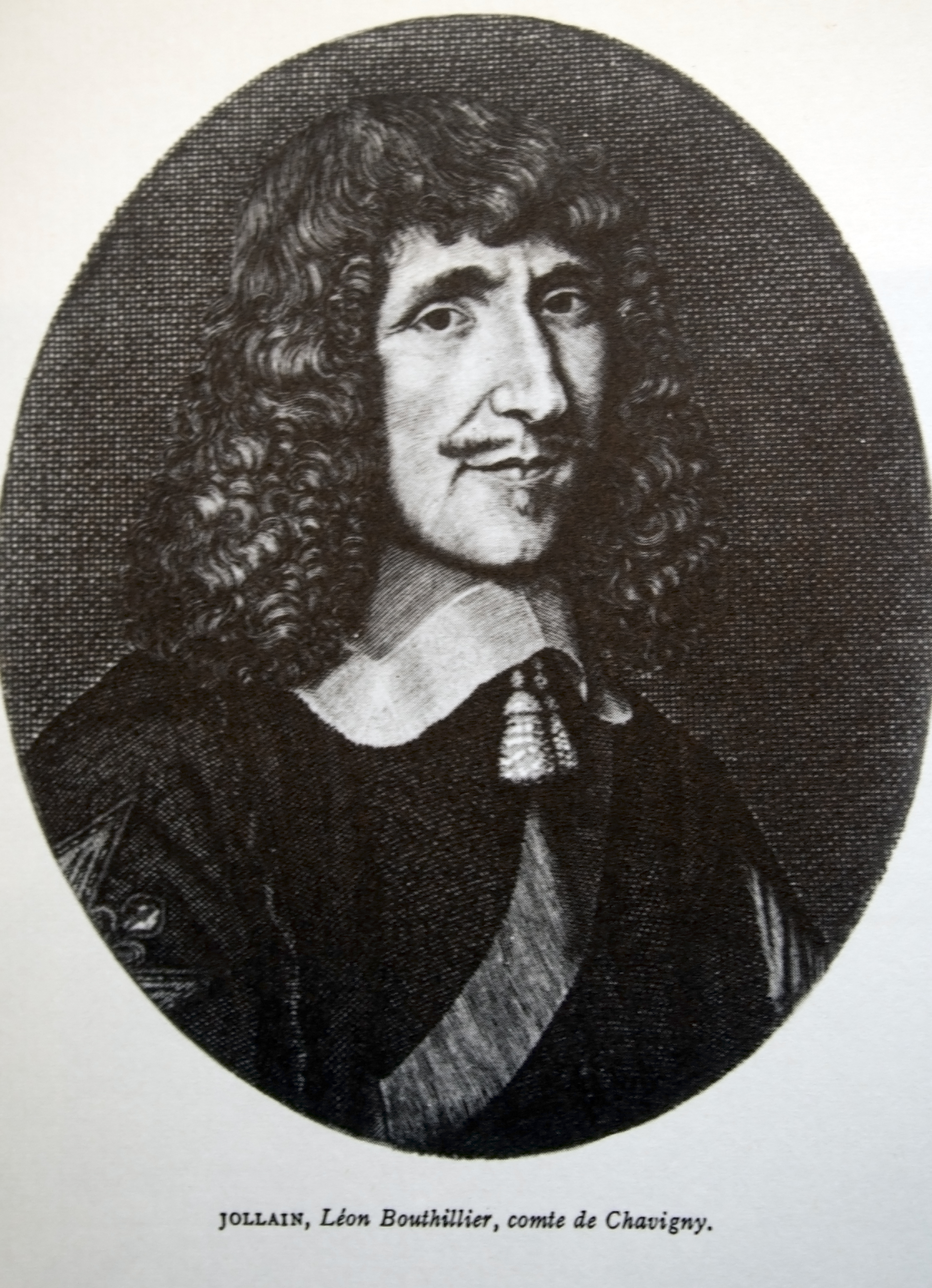
Léon Bouthillier

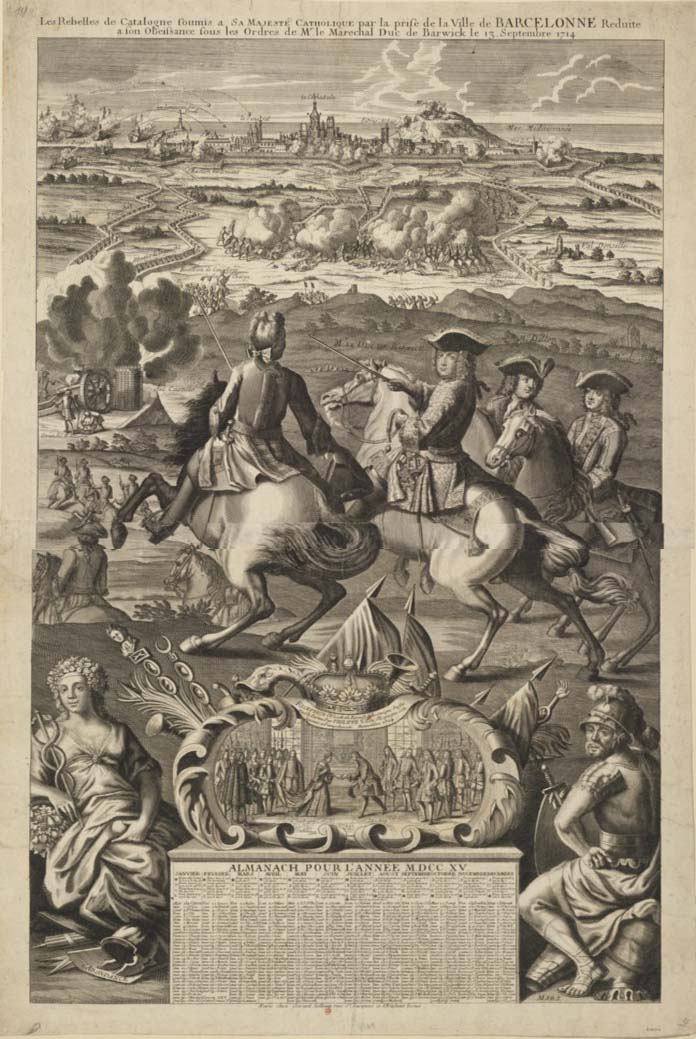
Siege of Barcelona (Gérard Jollain, 1715)

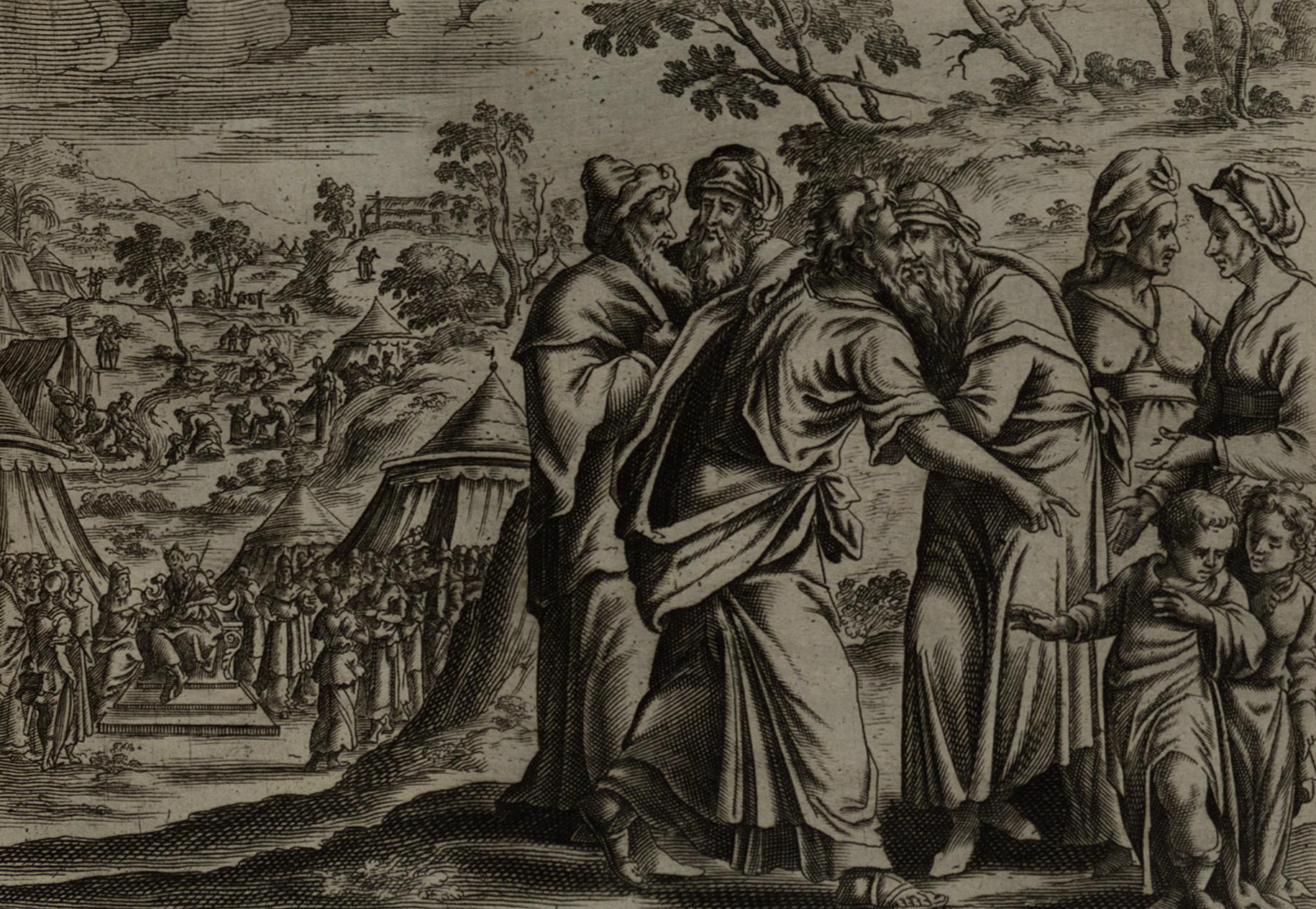
Jethro's visit (Gérard Jollain, 1670)

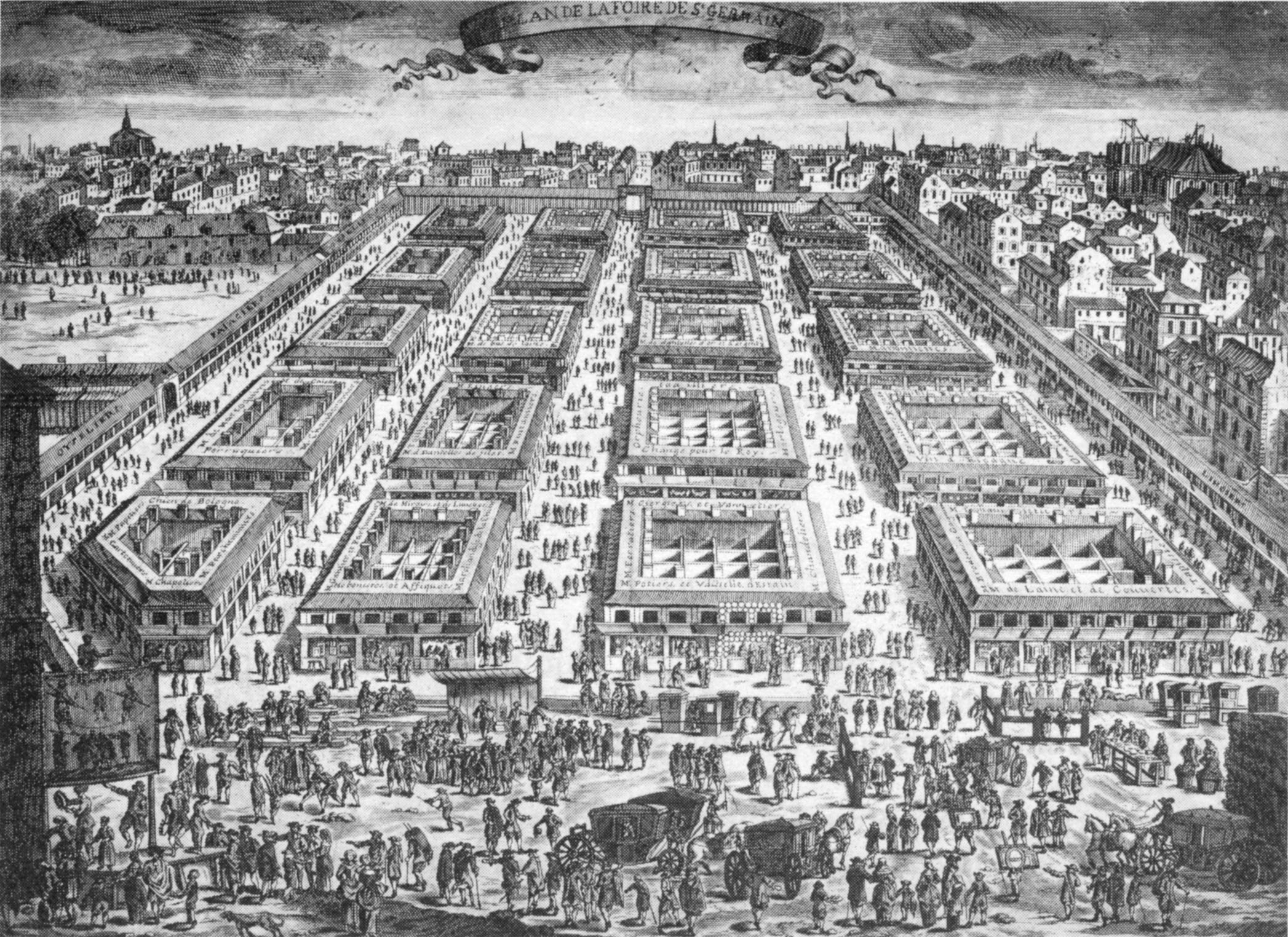
A Parisian fair

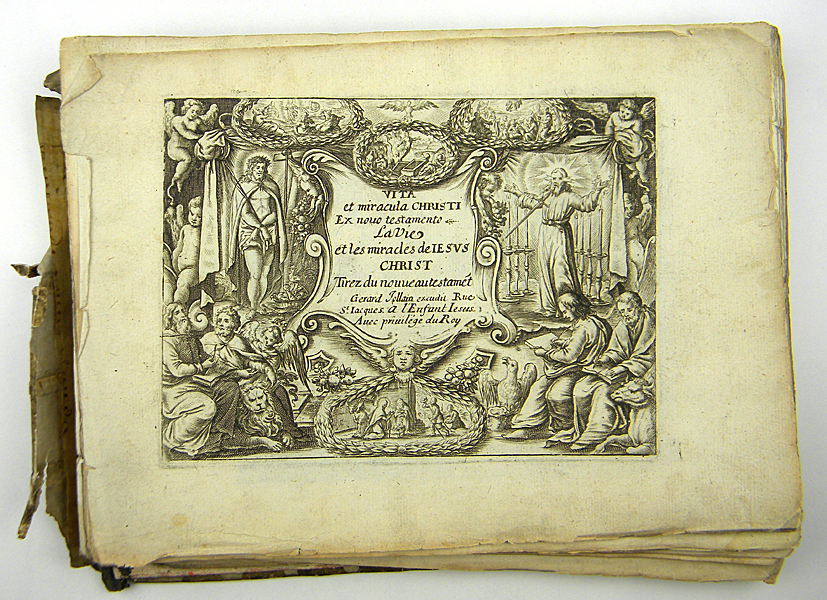
Collection of copper engravings by Gerard Jollain: Vita et Miracula Christi ex novo testamento.

== Sources ==
- Bénézit, E. (1976). Dictionnaire critique et documentaire des Peintres, Sculpteurs, Dessinateurs et Graveurs (new edition). Paris: Librairie Gründ. ISBN 978-2-7000-0149-5.
- Cypress, Rebecca (November 2007) "Chambonnières, Jollain and the first engraving of harpsichord music in France". Early Music, 35 (4): 539–553. ISSN 0306-1078.
- Saur, K. G., publisher (2000). The Artists of the World: A Bio-bibliographical Index A to Z. Munich: K. G. Saur. ISBN 978-3-598-23975-5.
- Thieme, Ulrich; Becker, Felix, founders (1907–1950). Allgemeines Lexikon der bildenden Künstler von der Antike bis zur Gegenwart, volume 19 (1926) by Hans Vollmer. Leipzig: Seemann. OCLC 679383924.
- Venard, Michèle (1985). La Foire entre en scène. Paris: Librairie Theâtrale. ISBN 978-2-7349-0011-5.
