= The Iconography of Manhattan Island =

Study of the history of New York City

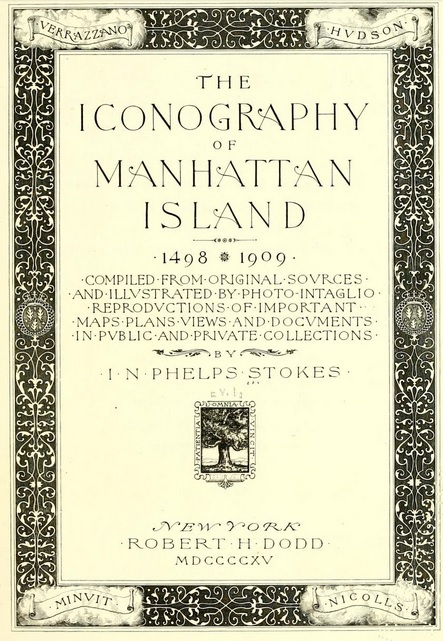
The Iconography of Manhattan Island Vol. 1 frontispiece

The Iconography of Manhattan Island is a six-volume study of the history of New York City by Isaac Newton Phelps Stokes, published between 1915 and 1928 by R. H. Dodd in New York. The work comprehensively records and documents key events of the city's chronology from the 16th to the early 20th centuries. Among other things, it shows the evolution of the Manhattan skyline up to the time of publication.

== Description ==
Stokes's worldwide research teams scoured public and private collections of maps, guides and obscure source material to complete his encyclopedic monument to New York City. It describes in detail the growth of a fortified Dutch settlement into a major city, and ultimately included six volumes sold to subscribers and libraries in a limited edition of 360 sets printed on Holland-made paper and 42 on Japanese vellum. The book itself states the paper used for printing the book was of English origin and not from Holland.

The Iconography’s many writers lead the reader through picaresque stories about the humble as well as praising major figures. Source material included accounts from ledgers, accounting books and scraps of paper that the author said had been strewn about in unorganized piles from the floors of far flung academies and international halls of records. Much of this primary source material has been lost to time or destroyed by war. In the rare first edition, there is a one page apology made by Stokes to subscribers of the rare set of works indicating where paper stock was - by necessity of shortage - changed from the original supplier's high grade Holland paper to similar high grade stock due to the exigency of the Great War.

== Stokes ==
I. N. Phelps Stokes was the scion of a progressive, wealthy turn-of-the century New York family. Leaving Harvard University with a desire to reform housing for the poor, Stokes' first contribution included model housing built not far from the "Five Points" neighborhood of Lower Manhattan: a breeding ground of crime due to over-crowded housing, poverty and disease. His insights into better housing for New York's poor enabled better living conditions through improved sanitation brought by modern building methods, and were shared by reformers such as Jacob Riis, Stanton Coit, Charles B. Stover and Carl Schurz. Stokes' work led to the New York Tenement Housing Law of 1901.

Stokes's three other lasting monuments include St. Paul's Chapel at Columbia University; 953 Fifth Avenue – an Italian Renaissance palazzo-style fourteen story apartment building occupying the east side of Fifth Avenue near 76th Street; and 184 Eldridge Street, also by the firm of Stokes and John Mead Howells, which has housed the University Settlement Society of New York since 1898, and is now a landmark listed on the National Register of Historic Places.

Stokes's bad real estate investments bankrupted him long after his monumental publishing effort left him in dire straits. Stokes spent his later years working as prints curator at the New York Public Library, specializing in city views.

== See also ==
- Cartography of New York City
