= Seaman's chest =

Box or suitcase used by a sailor for storing personal property

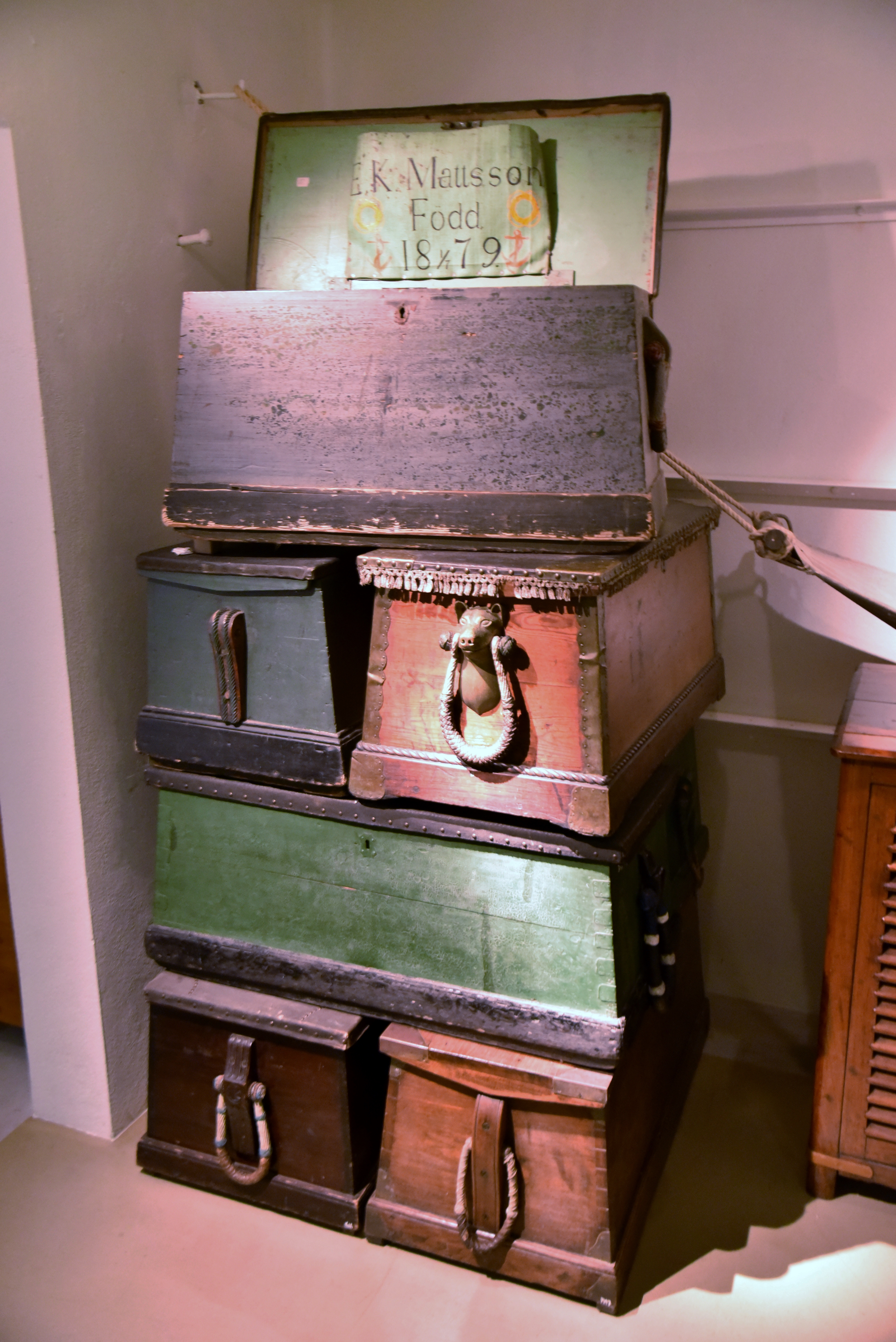
Seaman's chests at the Åland Maritime Museum in Finland

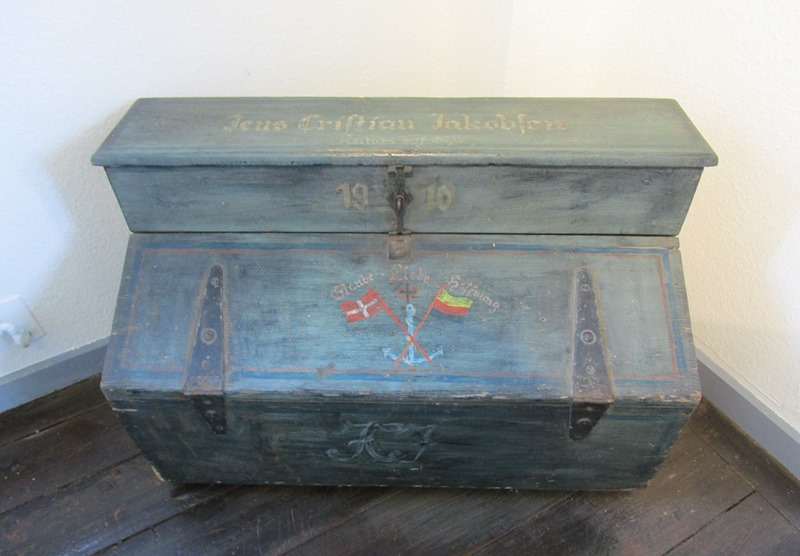
Seaman's chests from Sild island with the Dannebrog og North Frisias flag

A seaman's chest is a wooden chest which was commonly used by sailors to store personal belongings. They are also known as sea chests, not to be confused with the recesses found in the hull of certain ships.

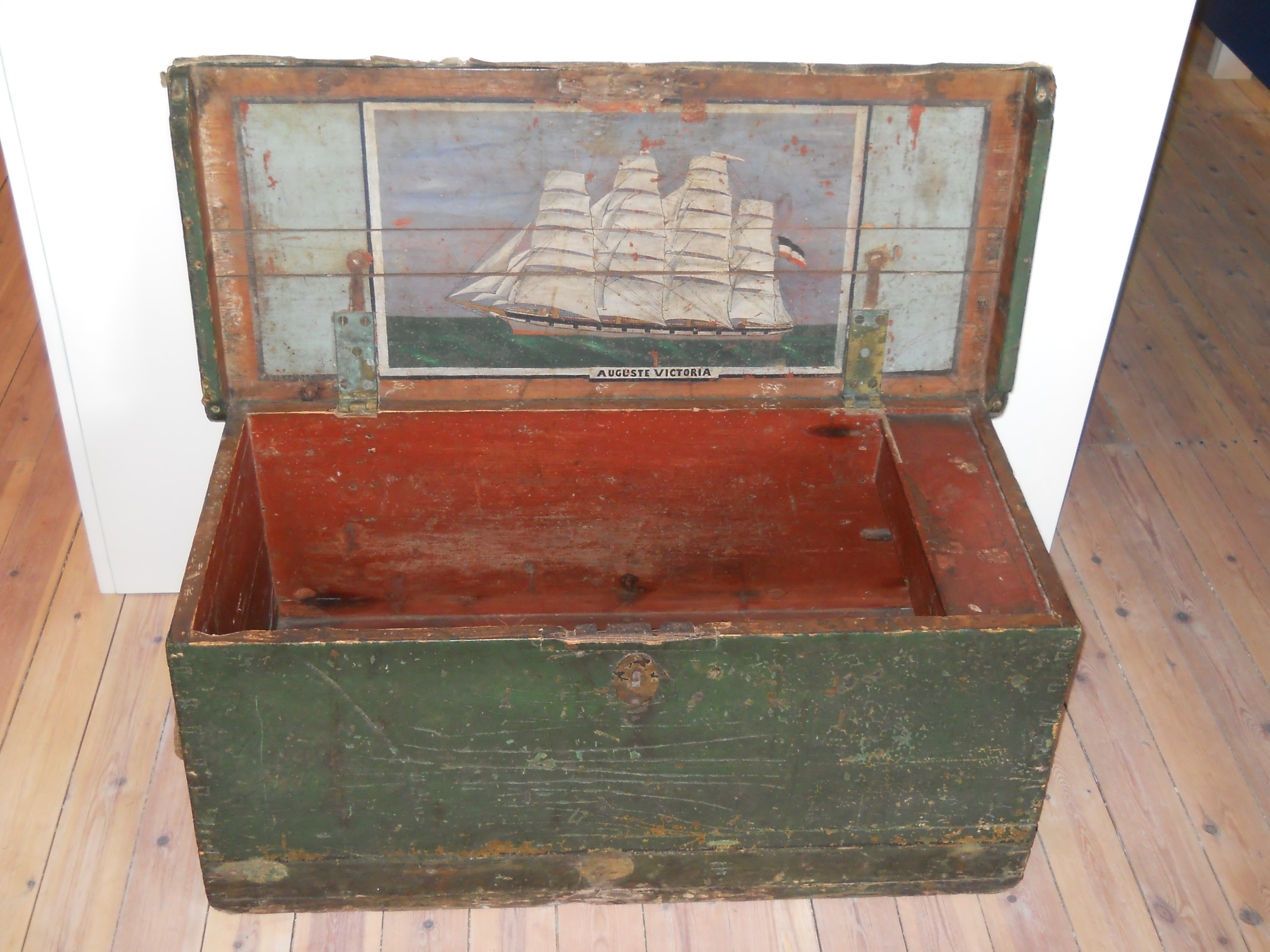
Seaman's Chest at the Schifffahrtsmuseum in Flensburg

== Design and Use ==
Seaman's chests were stored in the crew's quarters and were used as seats as well as containers for sailors' personal effects. Items that were stored in these chests include clothing, tools, keepsakes, and things for entertainment, such as books or cards. Most seaman's chests were decorated only with a coat of paint and the owner's name, although some had intricate paintings or carvings. Chests are mounted on two parallel wooden beams, similar to runners, which help to prevent damage from sliding as well as insulating them from moisture on the floor of the ship. The sides of the chests are not vertical, but rather slant inwards slightly. This lowers the center of gravity, making the chests less likely to tip over. The lid of a seaman's chest extends over the sides and is intended to be used as a seat. Seaman's chests are always equipped with a lock as well as handles on either side, known as beckets. These handles were made of cordage and were often woven into decorative patterns by sailors. Almost all chests contained at least one small compartment attached to the right-hand side, though some had compartments extending across the entire length of the interior.

== In Treasure Island ==
This novel contains a description of the contents of a seaman's chest belonging to pirate Billy Bones.

A strong smell of tobacco and tar rose from the interior, but nothing was to be seen on the top except a suit of very good clothes, carefully brushed and folded. They had never been worn, my mother said. Under that, the miscellany began—a quadrant, a tin canikin, several sticks of tobacco, two brace of very handsome pistols, a piece of bar silver, an old Spanish watch and some other trinkets of little value and mostly of foreign make, a pair of compasses mounted with brass, and five or six curious West Indian shells.

— Robert Louis Stevenson, Treasure Island

Though these belongings would have been reasonable for a former first mate and pirate such as Bones, most sailors would have only owned a few essential possessions, namely clothes and bedding.
