= Thomas Gamaliel Bradford =

American cartographer

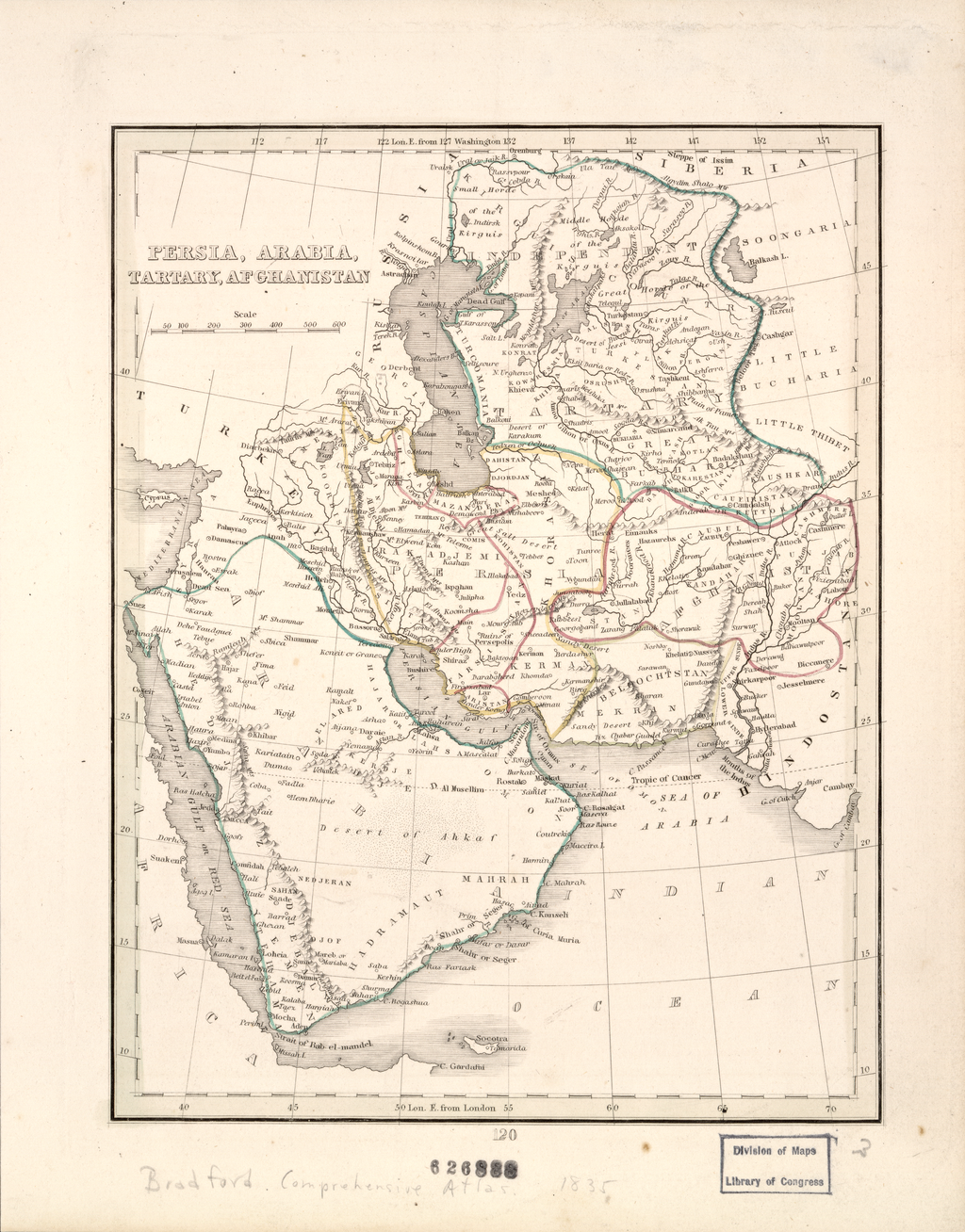
Persia, Arabia, Tartary, Afghanistan by Thomas Gamaliel Bradford, 1835

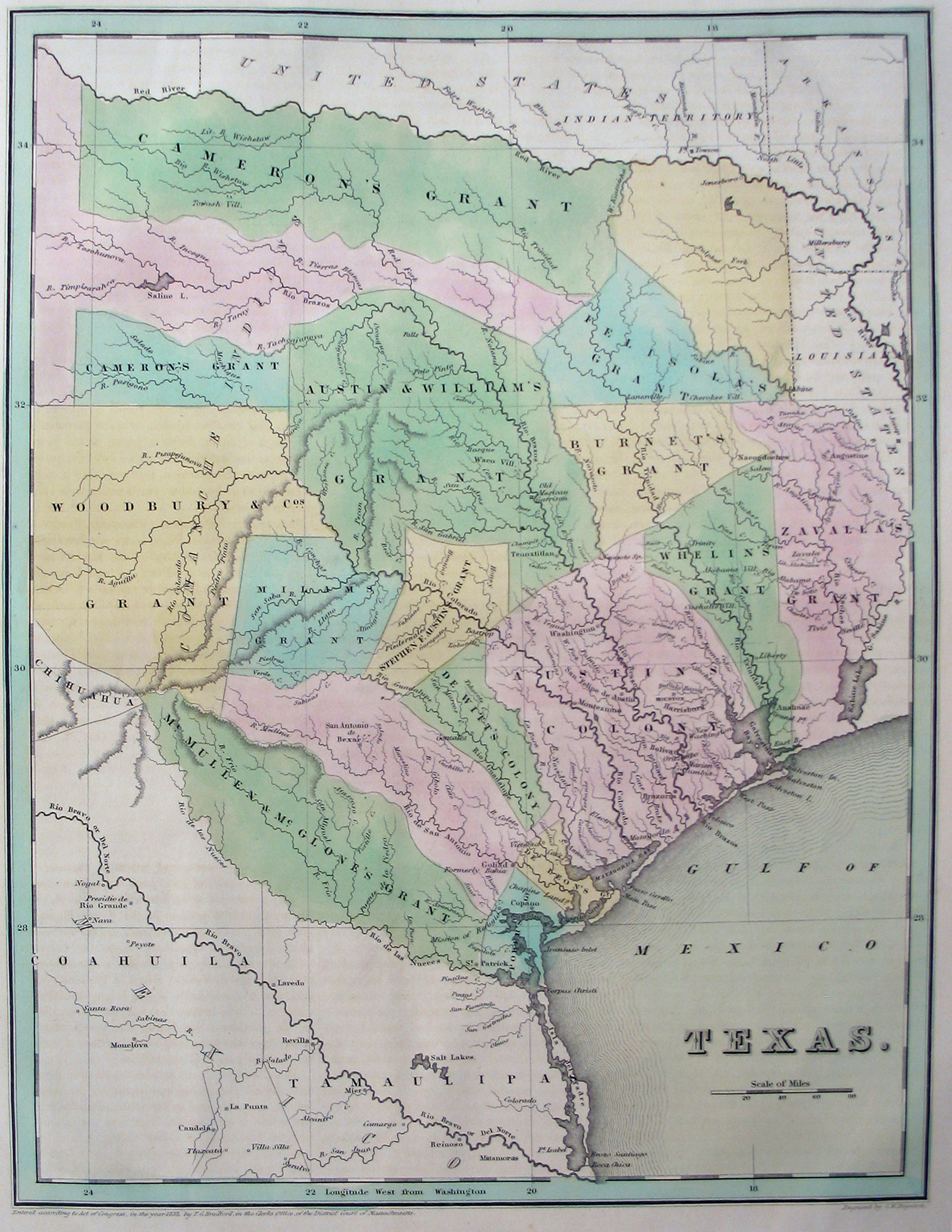
Texas by Bradford, 1838

Thomas Gamaliel Bradford (1802 – 1887) was an American cartographer.

Bradford was born in 1802 in Boston, Massachusetts. He worked for the America Encyclopedia. He revised and republished Atlas Designed to Illustrate the Abridgement of Universal Geography, Modern & Ancient which was originally created by Adrian Balbi. In 1835, he published A Comprehensive Atlas: Geographical, Historical & Commercial. His work is held in the collection of the Library of Congress and the Boston Public Library.
