= List of Philolexian Society members =

The Philolexian Society of Columbia University is one of the oldest college literary and debate societies in the United States. Following is a partial list of Philolexian Society members organized by area of notability.

== Architecture and engineering ==
Name	Class	Notability	Ref.
Julian Clarence Levi	1894	Architect	
William Barclay Parsons	1879	Civil engineer and founder of Parsons Brinckerhoff	

== Business ==
Name	Class	Notability	Ref.
Horatio Allen	1823	President of Erie Railroad, civil engineer, and inventor	
William Backhouse Astor Sr.	1811	Business magnate	
William Backhouse Astor Jr.	1849	Businessman, racehorse owner and breeder, and yachtsman	
Douglas Black	1915	President of Doubleday and Company	
Stuyvesant Fish	1871	Illinois Central Railroad president	
Robert Goelet	1860	Businessman and yachtsman	
James Lenox	1818	President of the New York Chamber of Commerce, bibliophile, and philanthropist	
Ward Melville	1909	Founding president of Thom McAn, Melville Corporation (CVS Health), and philanthropist behind Stony Brook University	
John Lloyd Stephens	1822	Founder and vice president of the Panama Railroad Company, Special Ambassador to Central America, explorer, and author	
John Aikman Stewart	1840	Banker	
William R. Travers	1838	Businessman and first president of the Saratoga Race Course	
Lawrence Wien	1925	Real instate investor and attorney who pioneered real estate syndicates	

== Clergy ==
Name	Class	Notability	Ref.
George Washington Bethune	1823	Preacher-pastor in the Dutch Reformed Church	
Jackson Kemper	1809	First missionary bishop of the Episcopal Church in the United States	
Thomas Merton	1938	Trappist monk, writer, theologian, and poet	
James B. Nies	1882	Episcopal minister and Assyriologist	
Benjamin T. Onderdonk	1809	Bishop of the Episcopal Diocese of New York	
Henry Onderdonk	1805	Bishop of the Episcopal Diocese of Pennsylvania	
Marvin Vincent	1854	Presbyterian minister and professor	

== Education ==
Name	Class	Notability	Ref.
Charles Anthon	1815	Classical scholar and educator	
Donald Barr	1941	Dalton School headmaster	
Wm. Theodore de Bary	1941	East Asian scholar and Columbia University provost	
Jacques Barzun	1927	Historian, provost, and University Professor at Columbia University	
Robert Fulton Cutting	1871	President of Cooper Union, financier, and philanthropist	
Dixon Ryan Fox	1911	Union College president	
Mott T. Greene	1967	Historian of science and academic	
Frank S. Hackett	1899	Educator, founder of Riverdale Country Day School, and pioneer in the Country Day School movement	
Carl Hovde	1950	Columbia College Dean	
James Hall Mason Knox	1841	Lafayette College president	
Arthur MacMahon	1912	Political scientist and pioneer in the academic study of public administration	
Robert Marshak	1936	City College of New York president	
Brander Matthews	1871	Academic and literary critic	
Parker Thomas Moon	1913	Political scientist and researcher on international peace	
Nathaniel F. Moore	1802	President of Columbia College	
Steven Raphael	1963	economist, professor of public policy at Goldman School of Public Policy, and adjunct fellow at Public Policy Institute of California	
Edwin R. A. Seligman	1878	Economist and academic	
William Milligan Sloane	1868	Historian, professor at Princeton University, and coach of the first U.S. Olympic team	
Howard Spodek	1963	Professor of history and geography and urban studies at Temple University	
Paul van K. Thomson	1940	Professor and vice president for academic affairs of Providence College, Catholic priest, and author	
John Howard Van Amringe	1860	Mathematician and the first Dean of Columbia College	
Eugene Victor Wolfenstein	1962	Social theorist, psychoanalyst, and a professor of political science at University of California, Los Angeles	

== Entertainment ==
Name	Class	Notability	Ref.
Sidney Buchman	1923	Film producer and Oscar-winning screenwriter	
I. A. L. Diamond	1941	Oscar-winning screenwriter	
Bernard M. L. Ernst	1905	Magician and associate of Harry Houdini.	
Orrin Keepnews	1943	Grammy-winning record producer	
William Ludwig	1932	Oscar-winning screenwriter and co-founder of the Writers Guild of America	
Robert C. Schnitzer	1927	Actor, producer, educator, and theater administrator	
Ben Stein	1966	Actor, comedian, and commentator	
Garth Stein	1987	Academy Award-winning film producer, screenwriter, and novelist	
John La Touche	1937	Lyricist for Cabin in the Sky and The Golden Apple	
Kenneth Webb	1906	Film director, screenwriter, and composer	
Gideon Yago	2000	MTV personality	

== Law ==
Name	Class	Notability	Ref.
Willard Bartlett	1869	Chief Judge of the New York Court of Appeals	
Samuel Blatchford	1837	Associate Justice of the Supreme Court of the United States	
Edgar M. Cullen	1860	Chief Judge, New York Court of Appeals	
James W. Gerard	1890	Justice of the New York Supreme Court and U.S. Ambassador to Germany	
Arthur Lazarus Jr.	1946	American Indian rights lawyer	
John Henry Livingston	1869	Lawyer	
John McKeon	1825	U.S. House of Representatives and United States Attorney for the Southern District of New York	
Edward Mitchell	1861	U.S. Attorney for the Southern District of New York and member of the New York State Assembly	
Frederic de Peyster	1816	Lawyer	
Benjamin Aymar Sands	1874	Lawyer	
Theodore Sedgwick	1827	U.S. Attorney for the Southern District of New York	
Charles H. Tuttle	1899	United States Attorney for the Southern District of New York	
Paul Windels	1908	lawyer and Corporation Counsel of New York City	

== Literature and journalism ==
Name	Class	Notability	Ref.
James Warner Bellah	1923	Western writer	
Elliott V. Bell	1925	BusinessWeek publisher, a financial writer for The New York Times, and New York State Superintendent of Banks	
John Berryman	1936	poet, scholar, and winner of the Pulitzer Prize for Poetry	
Randolph Bourne	1912	Essayist and critic	
McAlister Coleman	1909	Journalist, author, and political activist	
David Cort	1924	foreign news editor of Life	
Evert Augustus Duyckinck	1835	Biographer and publisher	
Jason Epstein	1949	Co-founder of The New York Review of Books, co-founder of Library of America, and founder of Anchor Books	
Edgar Fawcett	1867	Novelist and poet	
William Dudley Foulke	1869	Literary critic, journalist, poet, and reformer	
Allen Ginsberg	1948	Poet, author, and winner of the National Book Award	
Robert Giroux	1936	Publisher, chairman and editor-in-chief of Farrar Straus & Giroux	
Robert Gottlieb	1952	Editor-in-chief of Simon & Schuster, president and editor-in-chief of Alfred A. Knopf, and editor of The New Yorker	
Alfred Harcourt	1904	Publisher and co-founder of Harcourt Brace;	
John Hollander	1950	Poet	
Richard Howard	1951	Pulitzer Prize-winning poet and translator	
Joyce Kilmer	1908	Poet and literary critic	
Gustav Kobbé	1877	Music critic and author	
Henry Demarest Lloyd	1867	Pioneer muckraking journalist and progressive political activist	
Jay Michaelson	1993	Writer, journalist, professor, rabbi, commentator on CNN, and a columnist for Rolling Stone	
John L. O'Sullivan	1831	Magazine editor and columnist who coined the phrase manifest destiny and U.S. Minister to Portugal	
Sam Quinones	1964	Journalist and author	
Ed Rice	1940	Author, publisher, photojournalist, and painter	
Henry Morton Robinson	1923	Novelist	
Garth Stein	1987	Novelist and Academy Award-winning film producer	
George Templeton Strong	1838	Diarist	
Ralph de Toledano	1938	Editor of Newsweek and the National Review, journalist, author, poet, and novelist	
Thomas Vinciguerra	1985	Journalist, editor, author, and founding editor of The Week	
Walter Wager	1944	Novelist	
Samuel Ward	1831	Poet and lobbyist	

== Medicine, science, and math ==
Name	Class	Notability	Ref.
Cornelius Rea Agnew	1849	Surgeon and medical director of the New York Volunteer Hospital	
Gavin Arthur	1924	Sexologist, astrologer, actor, and magazine publisher	
Robert N. Butler	1949	Pulitzer Prize-winning gerontologist	
James Chapin	1916	ornithologist and curator of the American Museum of Natural History	
Oliver Wolcott Gibbs	1841	Chemist and president of the National Academy of Sciences	
Emory McClintock	1859	actuary	

== Military ==
Name	Class	Notability	Ref.
John Chrystie	1806	War of 1812 veteran and namesake of Chrystie Street in Manhattan	
Alfred Thayer Mahan	1858	Military theorist, United States naval officer, president of the Naval War College, and historian	

== Politics ==
Name	Class	Notability	Ref.
Martin C. Ansorge	1903	United States House of Representatives	
Elliott V. Bell	1925	New York State Superintendent of Banks, BusinessWeek publisher, and a financial writer for The New York Times	
Frederic René Coudert Jr.	1918	United States House of Representatives from New York and member of New York's Rapp-Coudert Committee	
Isaac C. Delaplaine	1834	United States House of Representatives	
Charles G. Ferris	1811	United States House of Representatives	
Hamilton Fish	1827	United States Secretary of State	
Hamilton Fish II	1869	Speaker of the New York State Assembly and U.S. Congressman	
Nicholas Fish II	1867	U.S. Ambassador to Switzerland and U.S. Ambassador to Belgium	
James W. Gerard	1890	U.S. Ambassador to Germany and justice of the New York Supreme Court	
Samuel L. Gouverneur	1817	member of the New York State Assembly and Postmaster of New York City	
James Alexander Hamilton	1805	Acting U.S. Secretary of State and son of Alexander Hamilton	
Abram Hewitt	1842	Mayor of New York City, United States House of Representatives, ironmaking industrialist, and lawyer	
Stephen W. Kearny	1812	Military Governor of New Mexico and Military Governor of California	
Harvey R. Kingsley	1893	President of the Vermont State Senate, attorney, and judge	
Wellington Koo	1909	Premier and foreign minister of China, ambassador to the United States, judge of the International Court of Justice	
William Langer	1910	Governor of North Dakota and U.S. Senate	
John L. Lawrence	1803	Chargé d'Affaires at Stockholm, member of the New York State Assembly and the New York State Senate	
William Beach Lawrence	1818	Governor of Rhode Island (acting)	
Hugh Maxwell	1808	Collector of the Port of New York and District Attorney of New York City	
John McKeon	1825	U.S. House of Representatives and United States Attorney for the Southern District of New York	
John Purroy Mitchel	1899	Mayor of New York City and Collector of the Port of New York	
John L. O'Sullivan	1831	U.S. Minister to Portugal and magazine editor and columnist who coined the phrase manifest destiny	
Charles A. Peabody Jr.	1869	New York State Assembly	
Edmund H. Pendleton	1805	United States House of Representatives	
George L. Rives	1868	United States Assistant Secretary of State	
James I. Roosevelt	1815	United States House of Representatives and District attorney for Southern New York	
John Lloyd Stephens	1822	Special Ambassador to Central America, explorer, author, and a founder and vice president of the Panama Railroad Company	
John R. Thurman	1835	United States House of Representatives	
Peter Dumont Vroom	1808	Governor of New Jersey, U.S. Congressman, and U.S. Minister to Prussia	
J. Mayhew Wainwright	1884	United States Assistant Secretary of War and United States House of Representatives	
Samuel Ward	1831	Lobbyist and poet	

== Sports ==
Name	Class	Notability	Ref.
Paul Governali	1943	Professional football player and coach	
William Milligan Sloane	1868	coach of the first U.S. Olympic team, historian, and professor at Princeton University	

== Miscellaneous ==
Name	Class	Notability	Ref.
Lucien Carr	1946	Member of the original New York City circle of the Beat Generation and convicted murderer	
Elbridge Thomas Gerry	1857	Social reformer, founder of the New York Society for the Prevention of Cruelty to Children	
