= List of Riverdale Country School alumni =

This list of alumni of Riverdale Country School, a college preparatory day school in New York City, includes graduates and students who did not graduate.

== List of alumni ==
- Virginia Abernethy (born 1934), anthropologist
- Dan Abrams (class of 1984), chief legal affairs anchor for ABC News
- Josh Appelbaum, television writer
- Sosie Bacon (born 1992), actress
- Charlie Barnet (1913–1991), jazz saxophonist, composer and bandleader
- Jacqueline Barton (born 1952), chemist
- Rosalyn Baxandall (1939–2015), historian
- Cliff Bayer (born 1977), Olympic foil fencer
- Lisa Birnbach (born 1956, class of 1974), author of The Official Preppy Handbook
- Richard Blumenthal (born 1946), U.S. senator from Connecticut
- Niesha Butler, basketball player, actress
- DJ Cassidy (born 1981), DJ, record producer
- Kathleen Cavendish, Marchioness of Hartington (1920–1948), socialite
- Louis Ozawa Changchien (born 1975), actor
- Chevy Chase (born 1943), actor
- Suzan Johnson Cook (born 1957), pastor and activist
- Jonathan Dean (1924–2014), United States ambassador to Mutual and Balanced Force Reductions talks
- Richard Engel (born 1973), NBC News chief foreign correspondent
- Harry Enten (born 1988), political journalist
- Lawrence Ferlinghetti (1919–2021), artist and social activist
- Varian Fry (1907–1967), journalist who ran a program helping thousands of Jewish refugees escape from Nazi Germany
- Peter Galison (born 1955), Joseph Pellegrino University Professor in history of science and physics at Harvard University
- Alexander Garvin (1941–2021), urban planner
- James Gleick (born 1954), science writer
- Leopold Godowsky Jr. (1900–1983), co-creator of the first color transparency film
- Rachel Hadas (born 1948), poet, teacher, essayist, and translator
- Calvin Hill (born 1947, class of 1965), former NFL player
- Molly Jong-Fast (born 1978), journalist and author
- John Kao (born 1950), author and strategic advisor
- Claude Kelly (born 1980), singer, songwriter and music producer
- John F. Kennedy (1917–1963), president of the United States, attended Riverdale's Lower School
- Robert F. Kennedy (1925–1968), U.S. senator
- Ron Kim (born 1979), politician
- Carlos Kleiber (1930–2004), conductor
- Gerard Koeppel (born 1975), author, historian, and journalist
- Robert Krulwich (born 1947), radio and television journalist
- John Lahr (born 1941), theater critic
- David Levin (born 1963), CEO of McGraw-Hill Education
- Lee MacPhail (1917–2012), Baseball Hall-of-Fame front-office executive
- Chloe Malle (born 1985), head of editorial content at Vogue
- Leopold Mannes (1899–1964), co-creator of Kodachrome, the first color transparency film
- Megan McArdle (born 1973), blogger and journalist
- Nick McDonell (born 1984), author
- Fred Melamed (born 1956), actor
- Howard Milstein, real estate developer
- Steven Mnuchin (born 1962) United States Secretary of the Treasury 2017–2021
- Wes Moore (born 1978), governor of Maryland
- Tim Morehouse (born 1978), fencer, 2008 Olympic silver medalist
- William C. W. Mow (born 1936), entrepreneur, chairman and CEO of Bugle Boy Industries
- André Nemec (born 1972), screenwriter
- Robin Pogrebin (born 1965), journalist
- Ed Rendell (born 1944), governor of Pennsylvania
- Cesar Romero (1907–1994), actor
- Clifford Ross (born 1952), photographer and artist
- Tracee Ellis Ross (born 1972), actress
- Andy Russell, founder and CEO of Trigger Media
- Carly Simon (born 1943), singer
- Scott Snyder, author
- Jordana Spiro (born 1977), actor
- Max Stafford-Clark, English theatre director
- Jason Strauss (born 1974), co-founder and co-CEO of Tao Group Hospitality
- Ratan Tata (1937–2024), former chairman of Tata Group
- Peter Vack, actor
- Jeffrey Vinik (born 1959), owner of the Tampa Bay Lightning
- Joss Whedon (born 1964), writer, director, and executive producer; creator of several television series (Buffy the Vampire Slayer, Angel, Firefly, Serenity)
- David Yazbek (born 1961), composer, lyricist, writer for Broadway and TV, including The Full Monty, The Band's Visit, Dirty Rotten Scoundrels, Women on the Verge of a Nervous Breakdown
- Tim Zagat (class of 1957), restaurant critic
- Michael Zakarin, guitarist for The Bravery
