= Joseph-François Mangin =

French-American architect

- Born: June 10, 1758; Dompaire, France
- Died: Unknown
- Occupation: Architect
- Buildings: St. Patrick's Old Cathedral
- Projects: 1803 Plan for New York (with Casimir Goerck), rejected
- Design: New York City Hall (1801-1802, with John McComb Jr.)

Joseph-François Mangin (born June 10, 1758) was a French-American architect who is noted for designing New York City Hall and St. Patrick's Old Cathedral in New York City.

He died in 1818 in Madrid, St Lawrence County, New York.

== Early life ==
Joseph-François Mangin was born in 1758 in the Vosges region of France, the son of Jean-Baptiste François Mangin (1724-1772), the king's surgeon, and Marie Anne Milot (1731-1804), both from Dompaire. He left Dompaire around 1773 to study at a high school in Nancy, where he graduated in 1777. He then studied law at the University of Nancy, graduating in 1781.

After working for a few years as a lawyer near Nancy, Mangin decided to move to Saint-Domingue (today known as Haiti), hoping to make a fortune. He left France from Nantes on October 25, 1784, and arrived in Saint-Domingue on December 7, 1784. Mangin and his brother Charles had to flee Saint-Domingue in 1793 as a consequence of the slave revolt which started in 1792.

They arrived in New York City in December 1793, where Mangin became a surveyor for the city, and where he naturalized in 1796.

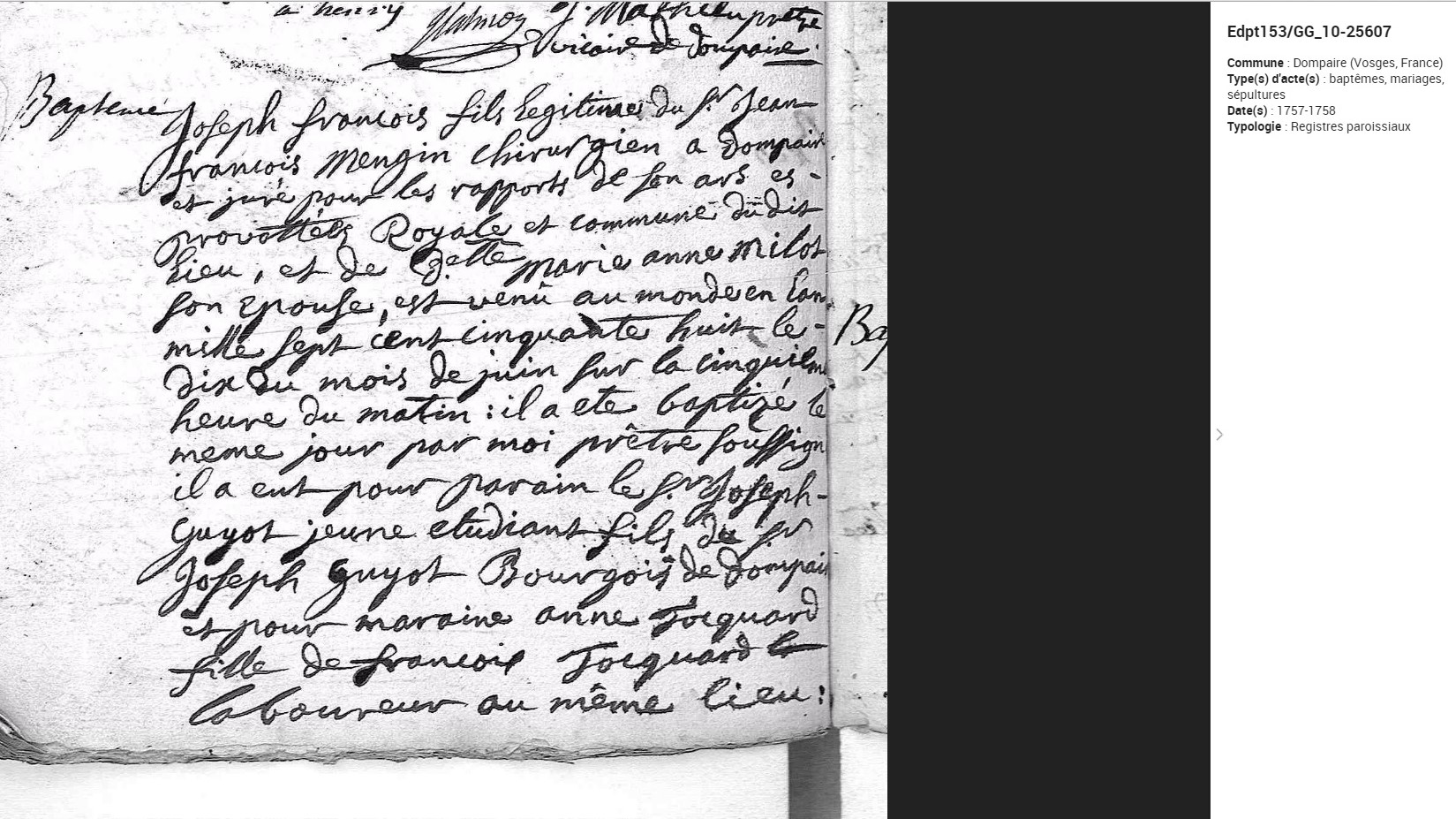
Joseph François Mangin's birth certificate in Dompaire, Vosges, France (1758). Note that family names in the 18th century could have different spelling as often based on pronunciation (in French, Mengin = Mangin).

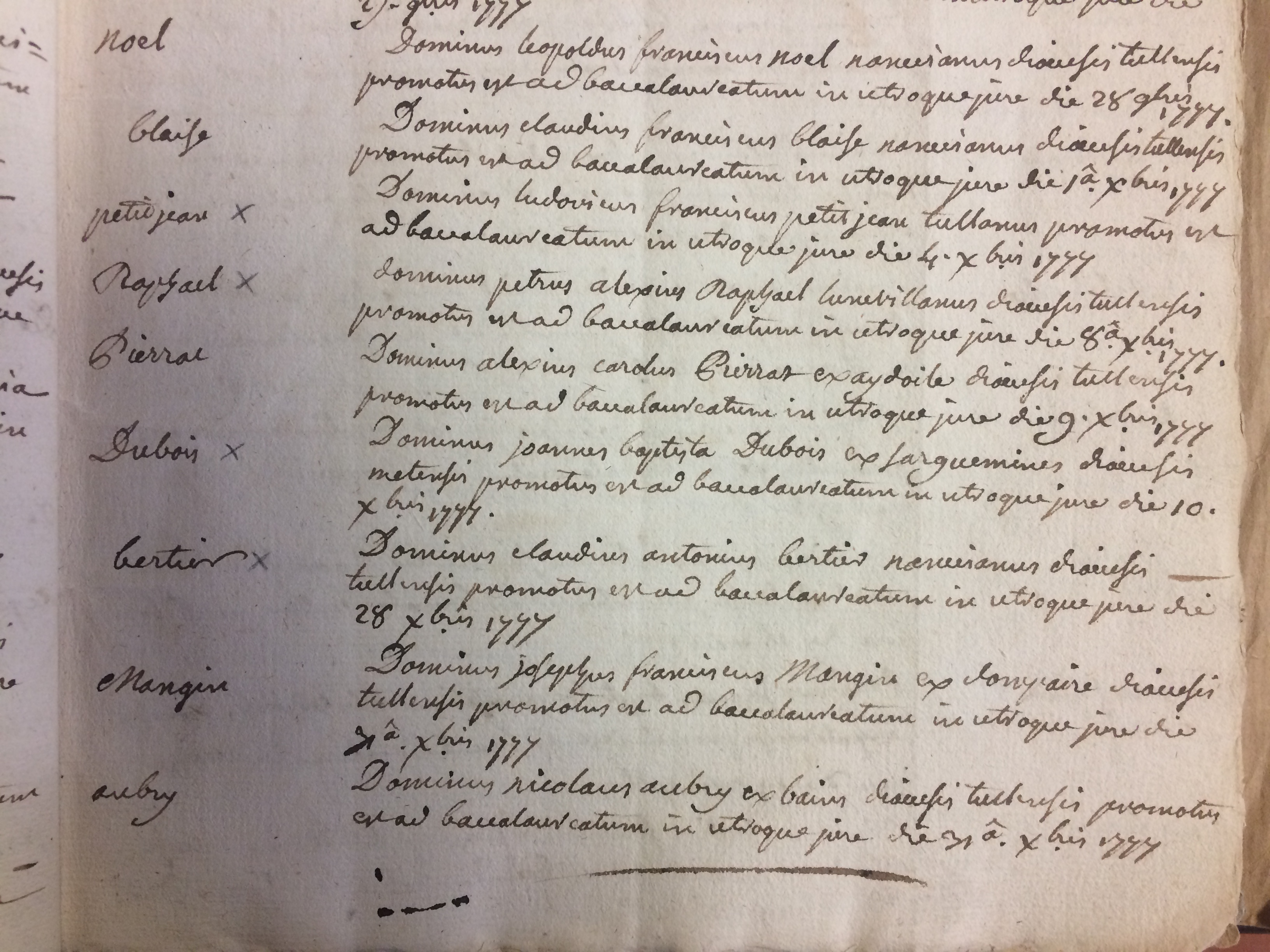
Joseph François Mangin's high school graduation (1777)

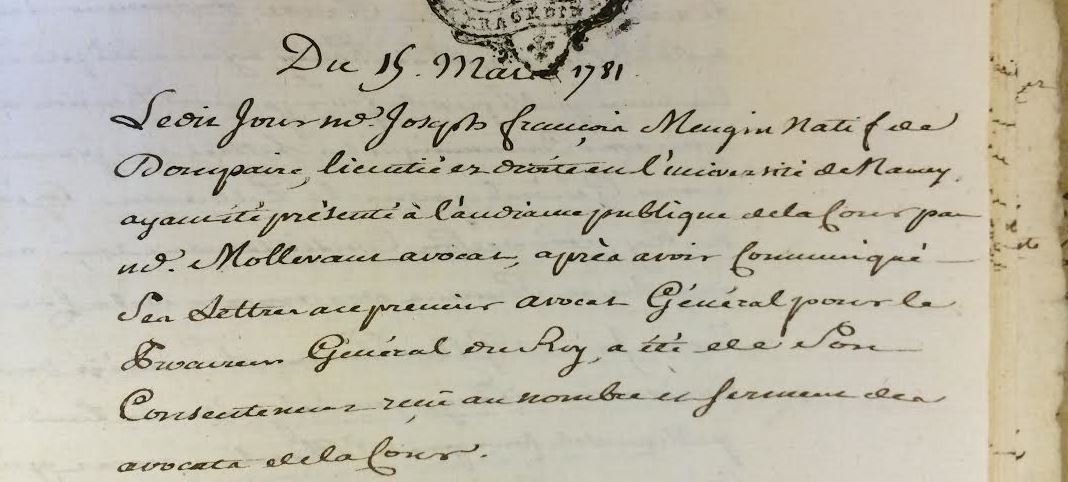
Joseph François Mangin's law degree (1781)

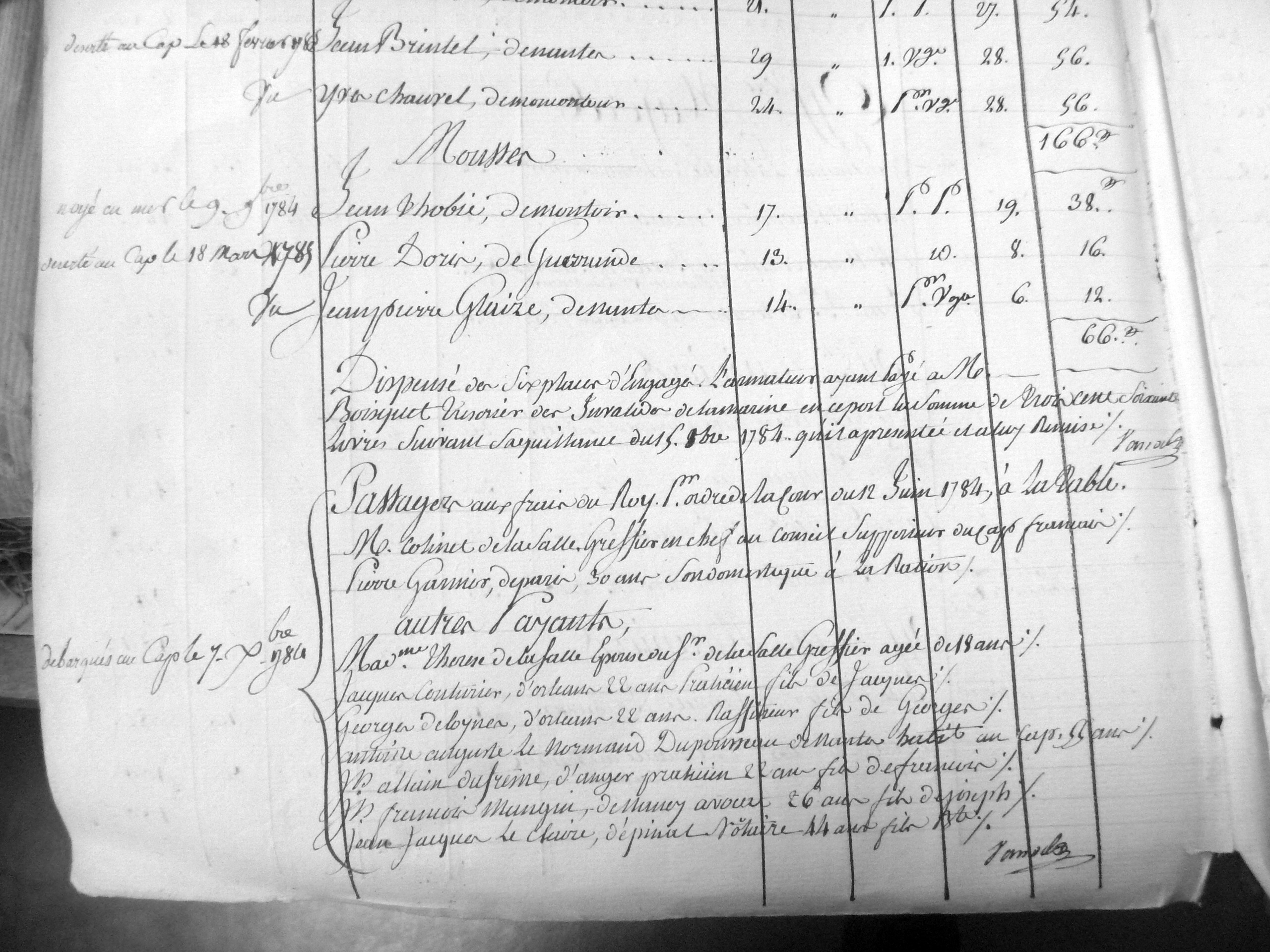
Passenger list of "La Marie Henriette" from Nantes (France) to Saint Domingue (1784) See the second last name at the bottom.

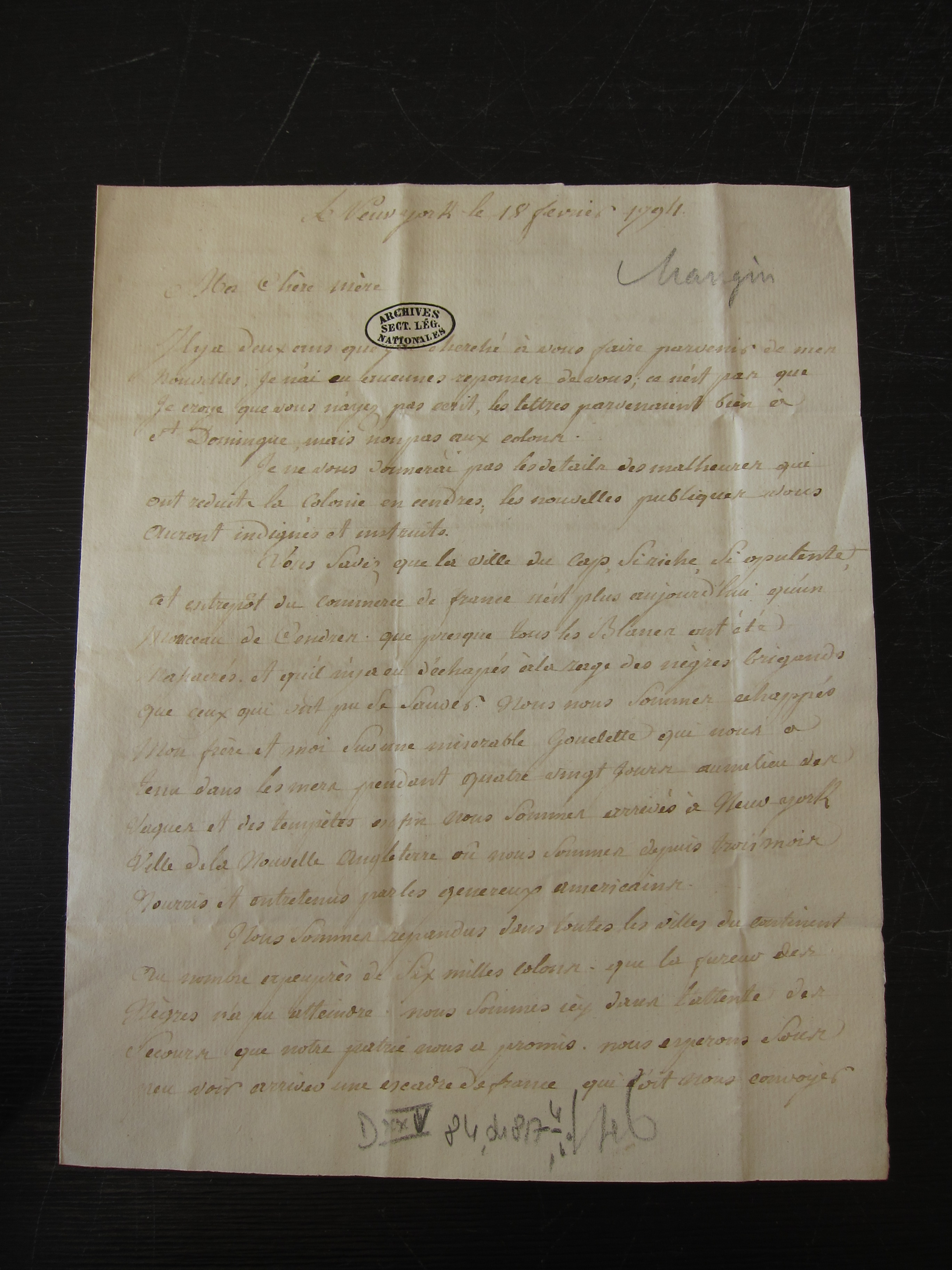
Letter to his mother (p1) following his arrival in New York City from ST Domingue (1794)

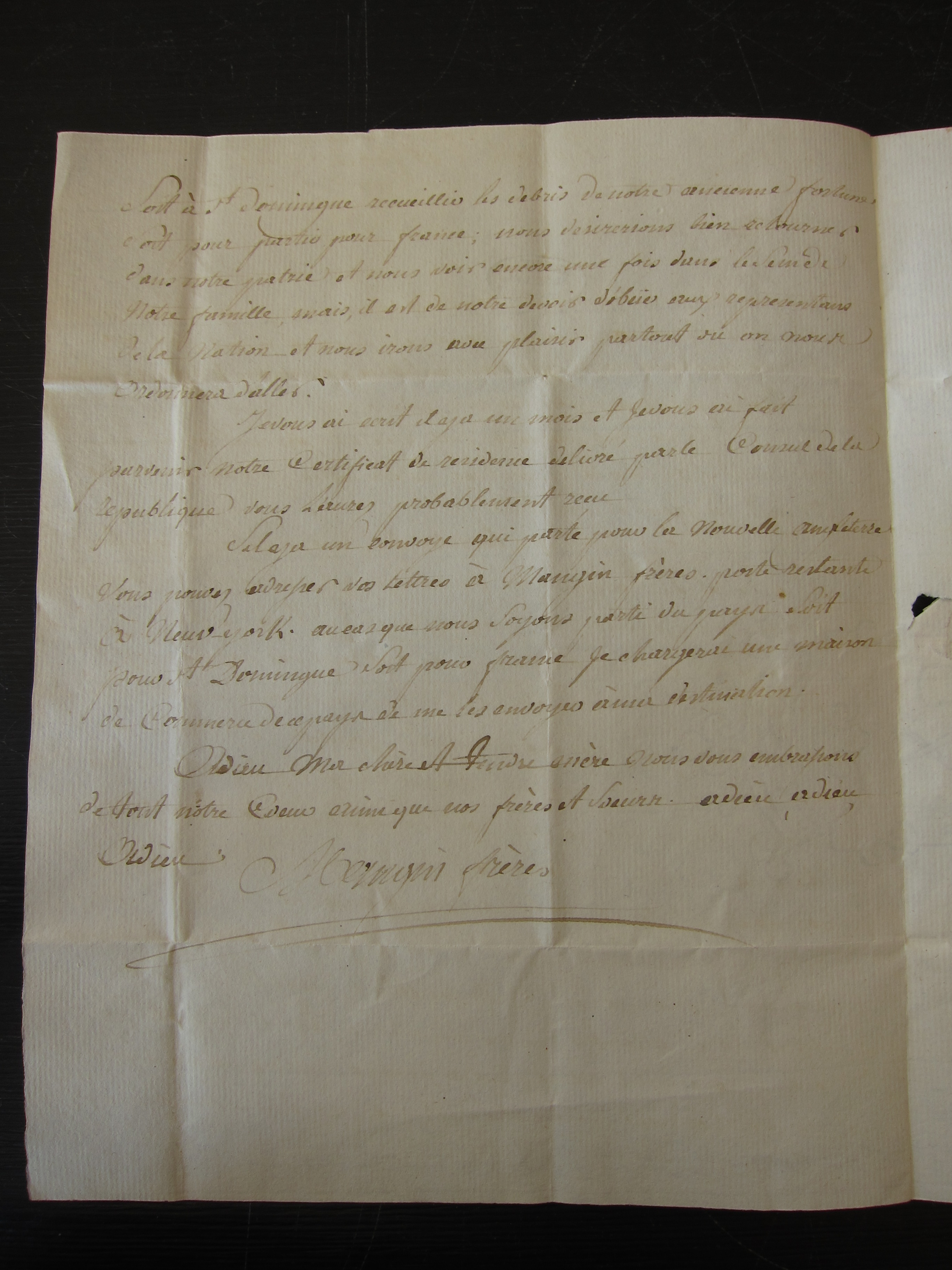
Letter to his mother (p2) following his arrival in New York City from ST Domingue (1794)

== Career ==
In New York, Mangin became a protégé of Alexander Hamilton, and as a result of Hamilton's influence, was hired by the federal government to design fortifications for New York Harbor. He also designed the city's first theatre in 1795, and New York state's first prison, in the village of Greenwich on the Hudson River, which would, when subsumed by the growth of the city, become Greenwich Village.

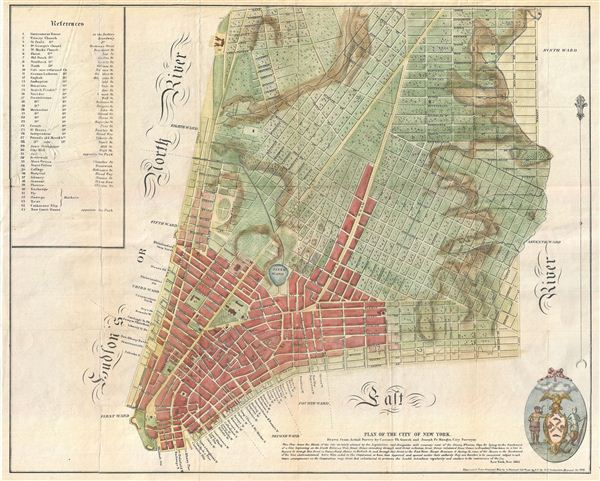
The Mangin–Goerck Plan

Mangin was appointed to be one of the handful of official recognized "city surveyors", he was a Military Engineer during the war of 1812 the United States. Mangin was at pains to point out to Hamilton his love for and allegiance to his adopted country: "I am an American, and the last drop of my blood will be shed in the service of my country."

Prior to New York City's Commissioners' Plan of 1811, the city's Common Council in 1797 commissioned city surveyors Casimir Goerck and Mangin to survey the streets of the city; Goerck and Mangin had each submitted individual proposals to the council, but then decided to team up. Goerck died of yellow fever during the course of the surveying, but Mangin completed it and delivered the draft of the Mangin–Goerck Plan to the Council in 1799 for correction of street names; the final engraved version would be presented to the Council in 1803. Unfortunately, Mangin had gone beyond the terms of the commission, and the map not only showed the existing streets of the city, but also, in Mangin's words, "the City ... such as it is to be..." In other words, the plan was a guide to where Mangin believed future streets should be laid out.

The Council accepted the Mangin–Goerck Plan as "the new Map of the City" for four years, and even published it by subscription, until political machinations perhaps organized by Aaron Burr, the political enemy of Mangin's mentor Alexander Hamilton, brought the plan into disrepute, and the Council ordered that copies which had already been sold be bought back, and that a label warning of "inaccuracies" be placed on any additional copies sold. Nevertheless, as the city grew, the Mangin–Goerck Plan became the de facto reference for where new streets would be built, and when the Commissioners' Plan was revealed in 1811, the area of the plan which the public had been warned was inaccurate and speculative, had been accepted wholesale by the commission, their plan being almost identical to Mangin's in that area.

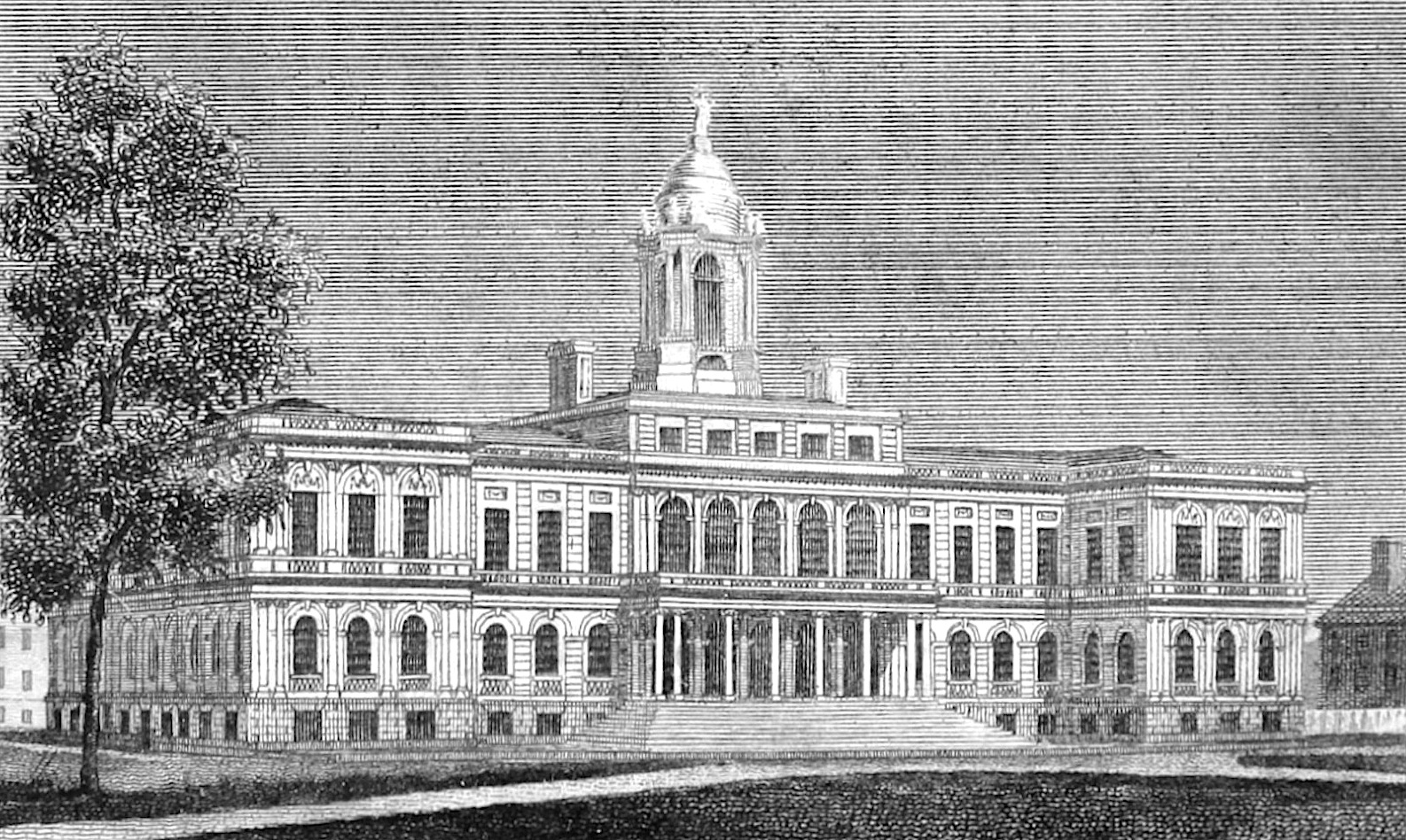
New York City Hall (1828)

In 1802, Mangin and John McComb Jr. entered a competition to design New York's City Hall, which they won. Among the twenty-five entries passed over was one submitted by architect Benjamin Henry Latrobe (who would go on to be known as the "Father of American Architecture," but would never design a building in New York City). Latrobe was a protegé of Hamilton's political enemy, Aaron Burr, and historian Gerard Koeppel speculates that this snubbing of an architect from Burr's circle was the cause of the downfall of the Mangin–Goerck Plan.

In 1803, the Common Council ordered some changes in the design. McComb supervised the construction of the building and the alternations made to the original design. The original cornerstone only listed McComb's name. Then in the 1890s, a descendant of McComb erased Mangin's name from the drawing they had submitted for the competition, so as to increase their value. In 2003, Mangin's name was added to the cornerstone of City Hall.

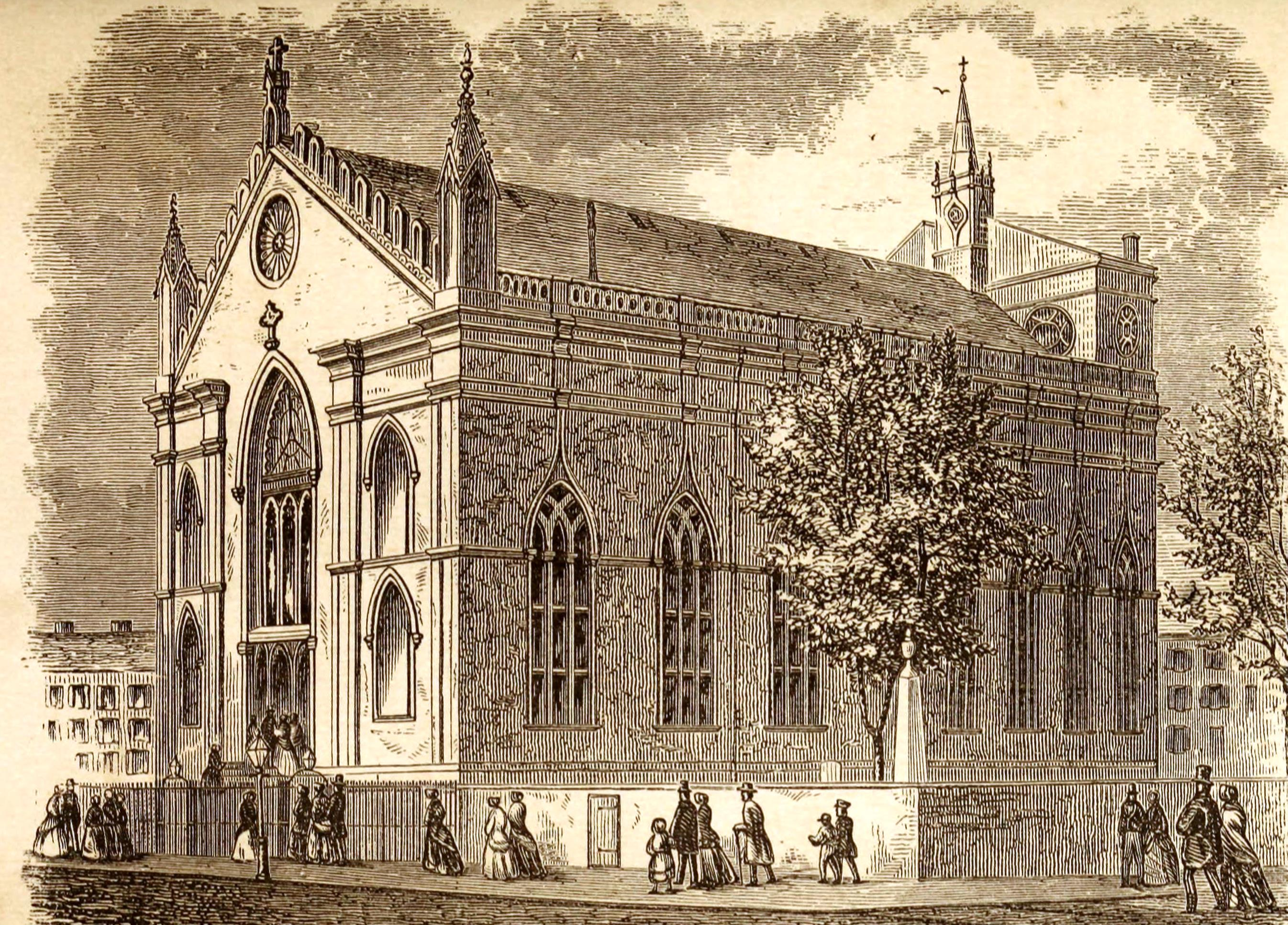
St. Patrick's Old Cathedral (1876)

In Spring 1807, Mangin sold his property in New York City and purchased a tract of land 1 mile (1.6 km)-square in upstate New York, in Madrid in St. Lawrence County. He went to live there, intending it to be his lifelong residence, but returned to the city before the winter was out, getting back his old position as a city surveyor. He sought out military contracts, but did not get any.

After his return to New York City, Mangin designed the First Presbyterian Church on Wall Street (1810), which was rebuilt twice before being taken apart and moved to Jersey City; and the city's original Greek Revival-style St. Patrick's Cathedral (1809-1815) at the corner of Mott and Prince Streets, which was altered after a fire in 1866 into a Gothic parish church, and was elevated to basilica status in 2010.

Mangin's work as a surveyor encompassed locations not only in New York City, but in New Jersey and in upstate New York.

== Legacy ==
Mangin Street, as laid out in the Commissioner's Plans, ran from Grand Street north to Houston Street to the East River at Rivington Street, which was extended as landfill areas were incorporated into Manhattan, and now extends just west of the FDR Drive. During urban renewal projects, most of the street disappeared, except for two short stretches under the Williamsburg Bridge and from Baruch Place to East Houston Street.

Mangin Avenue in St. Albans, Queens may also have been named after Mangin.

== Controversy ==
For many years, incorrect information circulated about Mangin's life. He was mistaken for another Joseph-François Mangin born in France around the same period, or was a slave, followed by becoming a student of one of the most prominent French architects, Ange-Jacques Gabriel.

Mangin being an extremely common last name in the East of France, the "other" Joseph-François Mangin was mistakenly found by late Pr. Robert L. Alexander from university of Iowa during his research in France. The one he found was born in 1764 in Châlons. His parents were Joseph Mangin and Jeanne Marie Anne Morin, and got married in Paris on 27 August 1806 to Marie Eleonore Antoinette Diodet.
