= Frank S. Hackett =

- Born: Frank Sutliff Hackett; 1878; Albany, New York, US
- Died: February 6, 1952 (aged 73–74); Riverdale, New York, US
- Education: Columbia University
- Occupation: Headmaster
- Known for: Founder of Riverdale Country Day School; Proponent of the Country Day School movement
- Term: 1907–1949

Frank Sutliff Hackett (1878 – February 6, 1952) was an American educator and founder of Riverdale Country Day School. He was a pioneer in the Country Day School movement.

== Biography ==
Hackett was born in Albany, New York, and was educated at Trinity School and Columbia College, where he received his BA in 1899 and was a member of the Philolexian Society. He taught English at Columbia after graduation and worked for Henry Holt and Company before serving as assistant headmaster of the Berkeley School in New York City.

An early proponent of the Country Day School movement, which envisions an environment where students can receive scholarly, intimate teaching in locales with abundant recreation space, Hackett founded Riverdale Country School with his first wife, Frances Dean Allen, in 1907 and served as headmaster until 1949.

During World War I, Hackett served as a Dollar-a-year man in Washington, D.C. to assist with war efforts. He was also an early organizer and former president of the Adirondack Mountain Club. He founded Camp Riverdale, a summer camp for boys nine to sixteen. He was an organizer of the Guild of Independent Schools of New York City and the New York State Association of Independent Schools. He also served as an American delegate to UNESCO conferences and held key posts in a number of educational organizations, including the Schoolmasters Association of the United States and the National Camp Directors Association.

He was the recipient of honorary degrees from Williams College and Columbia University.

Hackett died on February 6, 1952, at age 74. Hackett Park in Riverdale, Bronx, is named after him.
