= Shore Country Day School =

Private elementary and middle school in US

Coordinates: 42.5687°N 70.8880°W

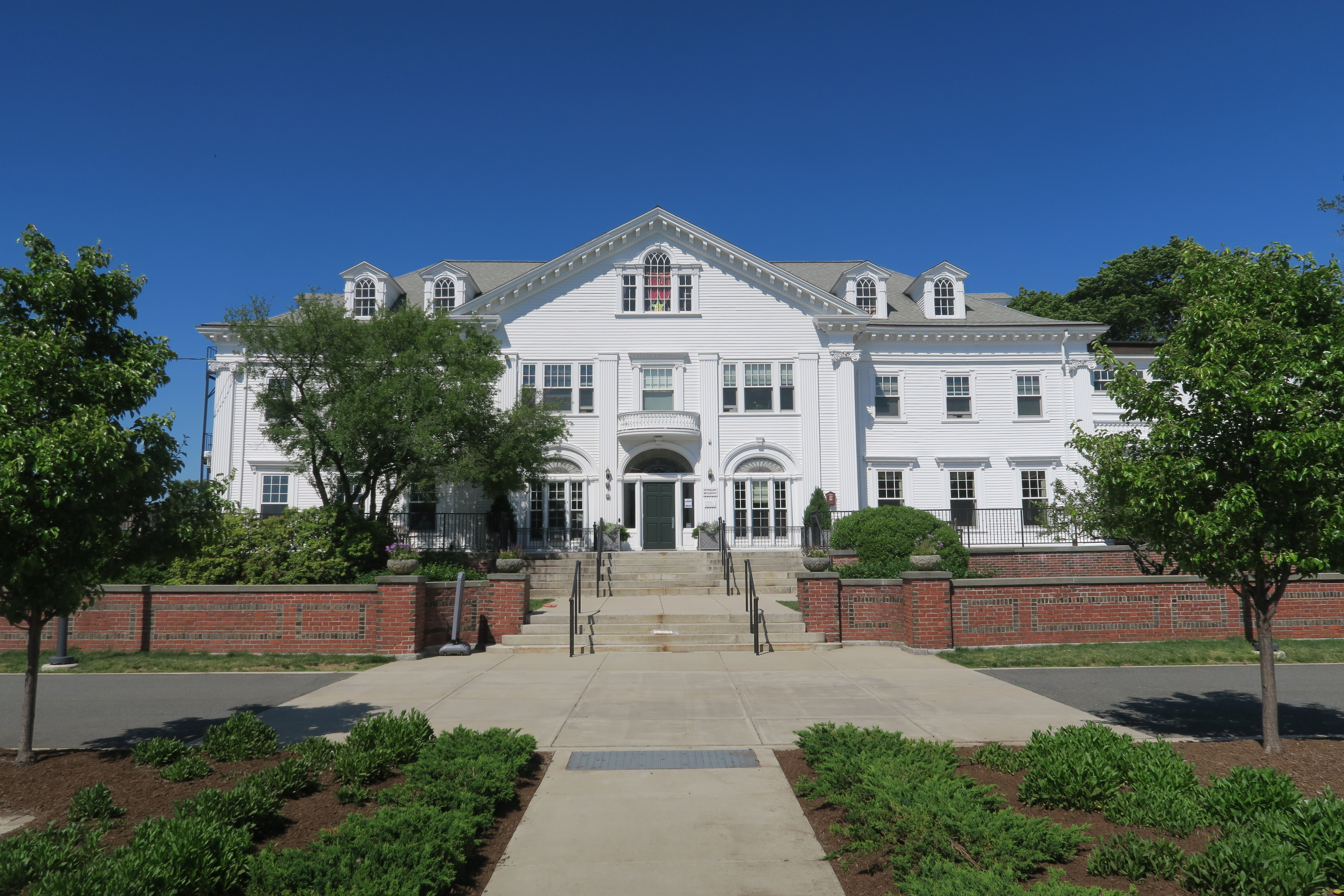
Winslow Building

Shore Country Day School is an independent elementary and middle school in Beverly, Massachusetts, United States. It was founded in 1936 following the tenets of the Country Day School movement. The private school educates students from a Pre-Kindergarten program through to Grade 8. It is accredited by the Association of Independent Schools in New England. As of 2026, total enrollment is 260.

The school is located on a 17-acre campus, with multiple athletic fields, two gyms, a library resource center, and five school buildings.

== History ==
At the heart of the school's campus is the Winslow Building, which was originally the property of Sidney Winslow, a prominent industrialist associated with founding Beverly's historic United Shoe Machinery Corporation. Winslow's mansion housed the former North Shore Country Day school, which merged with the Shore School of Beverly Farms in 1936 to form Shore Country Day School.

A historical mural was painted in the Library Media Resource Center in 2011, depicting the history of Beverly as it relates to the school. The artists, Joshua Winer and David Fichter, researched notable events in local history and integrated these into a large mural which features 12 prominent individuals.

The school was featured in North Shore magazine's list of the leading private schools in the area in 2011/2012.

The school formerly educated students in Grade 9, but the program was dropped for the 2023/2024 school year and has not resumed since.
