= Clarity Capital =

Israeli financial company

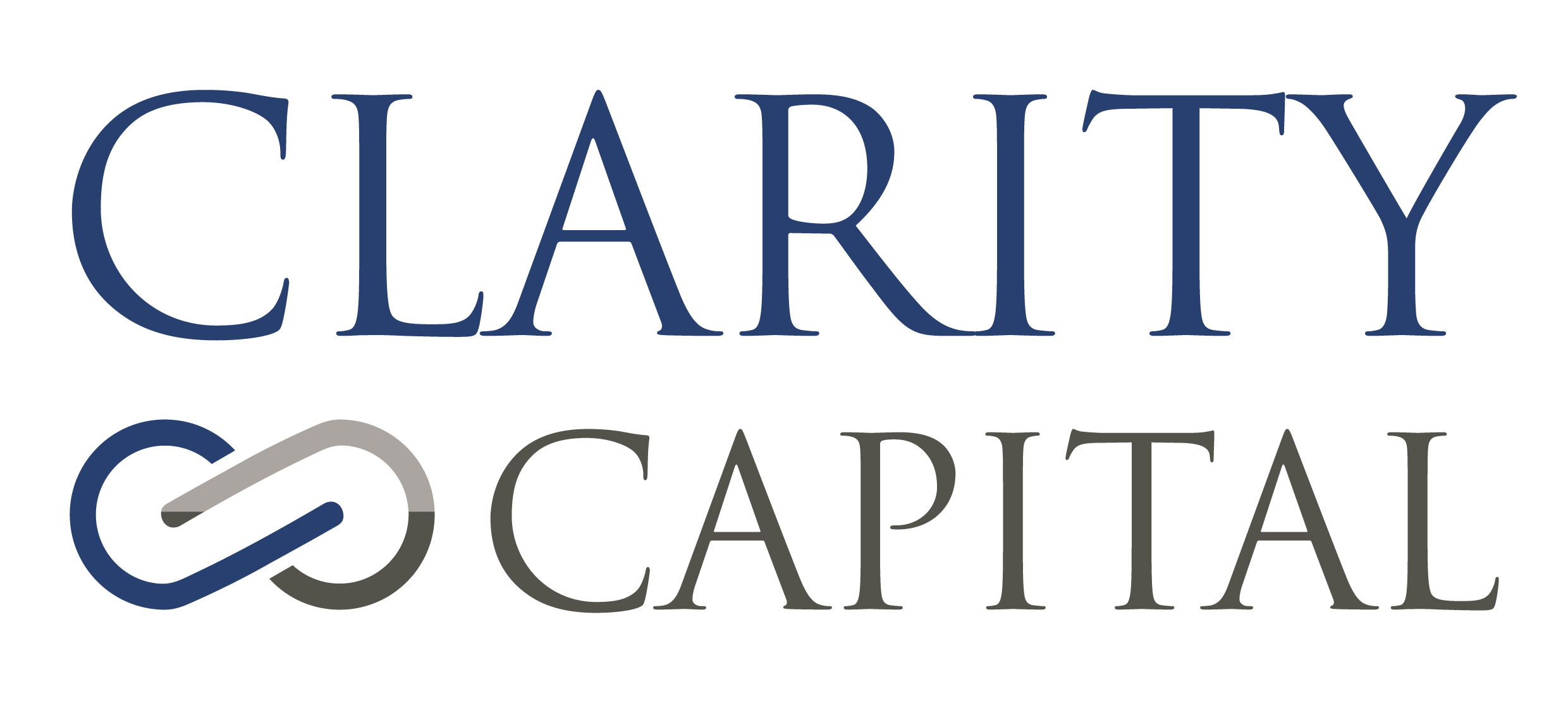

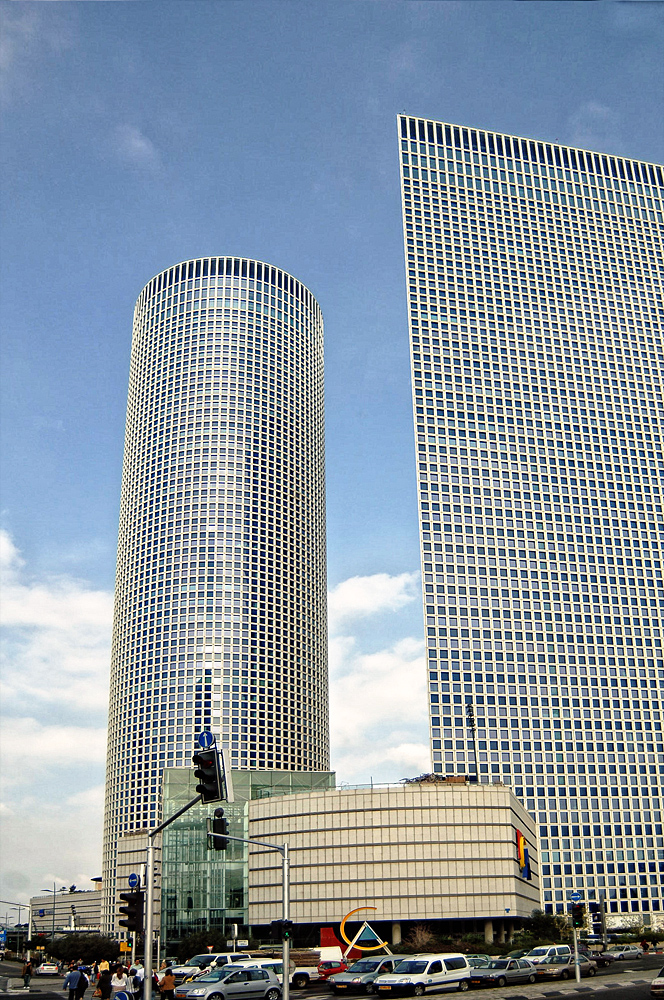
- Clarity Capital's headquarters at Azrieli Center, Round Tower
- Industry: Investment management
- Founded: 2007
- Headquarters: Tel Aviv, Israel; New York, United States
- Key people: Tal Keinan (Executive Chairman), Amir Leybovitch (Chief Executive Officer), David Steinhardt (Co-Founder and Co-President), Eran Peleg (Chief Investment Officer)
- Number of employees: 18
- Website: claritycap.com

Clarity Capital is an investment firm based in Tel Aviv, Israel. Founded in 2007, the firm serves high-net-worth families and institutions including arts, educational endowments, and philanthropic endowments. It invests in the public equity, fixed income, and alternative investment markets globally, managing over $1 billion in assets.

== History ==
Clarity Capital was founded in 2007 by four partners: Tal Keinan, David Steinhardt, Jay Pomrenze, and Sender Cohen. It was founded under the name KCPS, an acronym of the firm's founding partners. The firm was founded to create a global financial services industry in Israel, following the Israeli high-tech industry model.

Prior to the capital markets reforms in Israel, which began to take place is 2005, the establishment of a global financial center in Israel was not possible. After major reforms were implemented, the firm's partners saw an opportunity to create a new global industry in Israel. Clarity Capital has since been cited as the first significant exporter of financial services from Israel.

The firm has served as an advisor to the Israeli government on related policy and legislation. Notably, Tal Keinan served on the Advisory Board of the Ariav Commission, the Bank of Israel, and Finance Ministry task force on the creation of a global financial center in Israel.

In 2013, Clarity Capital established a New York office managed by David Steinhardt, a Wall Street veteran and the son of hedge fund investor Michael Steinhardt, and Laurence Schreiber, a Wall Street veteran with 20 years of senior management experience at firms such as Deutsche Bank and Bank of America Merrill Lynch.

The firm is licensed with the US Securities and Exchange Commission, the Israel Securities Authority, the Autorité des Marchés Financiers in France, and the Canadian Ontario Securities Commission.

== Business activities ==
KCPS Private Equity, today known as Kedma Capital, was founded and seeded by KCPS (now Clarity Capital). The first round of capital, $80 million, was raised in 2006 and since then further capital has been raised and the firm now manages around $250 million. The firm was spun off of Clarity Capital and today exists as its own company.

KCPS Manof, was one of the special credit funds the Israeli Ministry of Finance established during the Great Financial Crises of 2008 to help support the Israeli economy. Clarity Capital was selected as one of four firms that would run these funds. Each fund was seeded with about 500 million shekels and tasked with providing capital via either equity, debt, or both to Israeli firms as a source of non-banking finance. KCPS Manof made its first investments in 2009, and later on focused on returning capital to the investors. In 2013, it was reported KCPS Manof was far out-stripping Origo Manof, its sister and competing fund, as the expected lifetime return for fund stood at around 16%.

In 2017, Clarity Capital announced the launch of a Socially-Responsible Investment strategy with Greeneye, an advisory firm specializing in the SRI field.
