= Canton Country Day School =

Coordinates: 40.834°N 81.403°W

- CCDS' pinwheel logo
- Canton, Ohio; United States

Information
- Type: Early-Middle
- Motto: A Good Beginning Never Ends
- Established: 1964
- Principal: Patrick Ater
- Grades: Early Learning - Grade 8
- Campus size: 40 acres (160,000 m^{2})
- Campus type: suburban
- Colors: Blue & White
- Mascot: cougar

Canton Country Day School, (commonly referred to as CCDS), is an independent day school in Canton, Ohio. The school founded in 1964 as part of the Country Day School movement, with the aim of combining innovation with a superior elementary education dedicated to the liberal arts. It is the only non-sectarian independent PreK-8 school in Stark County, Ohio. The school has been recognized by the Blue Ribbon Schools Program, the highest award an American school can receive.

The curriculum includes Language Arts / Social Studies, Science, Mathematics (including Algebra I and Geometry), Spanish, Music, Art, Public Speaking, Physical Education, and creative movement.

The school's financial aid policy has allowed the school to attract a diverse student body.

Canton Country Day School also participates in helping other kids across the world. In 2008, the school participated in Books of Hope, sending many books and some money to the Koch Goma school in Africa.

== Awards and recognition ==
During the 1991-92 school year, Canton Country Day School was recognized with the Blue Ribbon School Award of Excellence by the United States Department of Education. Representatives of the school attended two days of ceremonies in Washington, D.C. to collect the award, starting on May 13, 1993.

The school won the Governor's Award for Excellence in Youth Science Opportunities in both 1986 and 1987. The 1987 award came in competition against 130 school programs statewide.

== History ==
The school was established in 1964 with 72 students in six grades, and moved to its current 40-acre (160,000 m^{2}) campus in 1969. An expansion in 1996 allowed for it to include students in preschool through eighth grade, although preschool did not become available until 2001.

== Athletics ==
Athletic programs offered to students include Co-ed soccer (fall), boys' and girls' basketball (winter) and boys' and girls' track and field (spring). Kurtis Roberts, the school's former physical education teacher, finished 5th place in shot put in the olympic trials, one place before making the team.
