= Country Day School movement =

Progressive education movement in the United States

The Country Day School movement is a movement in progressive education that originated in the United States during the late 19th century. Country Day Schools sought to recreate the educational rigor, atmosphere, camaraderie and character-building aspects of the best college-prep boarding schools, while allowing students to return to their families at the end of the day. To avoid the crime, pollution and health problems of the industrial cities of the early 20th century, the schools were sited in the 'country', where wealthy families owned large homes in areas that would later be known as suburbs.

== Overview ==
The Country Day School movement shared many values with the Arts and Crafts movement. School buildings and campus landscaping were designed with the goal of creating an inspirational atmosphere that would foster learning and culture. In keeping with this holistic view of the student learning environment, various "after-school" programs promoted student development, including athletic programs, choir and religious studies, and monitored study time. Students were given opportunities to develop leadership skills through clubs and student organizations.

The first Country Day Schools were Poly Prep Country Day School in Brooklyn, University School near Cleveland, Detroit Country Day School, Gilman School in Baltimore, McDonogh School near Baltimore, and The Summit Country Day School in Cincinnati. These six college-preparatory schools provided the structure and campus location format which would guide many more Country Day Schools that would be built around the country over the next 100 years. A leader in the movement, Tower Hill School, was founded by the du Pont family in Wilmington, Delaware, and headed by Burton Fowler, a devout follower of John Dewey and president of the Progressive Education Association.

== List of schools ==
Along with those listed above, prominent Country Day Schools include the following:

=== United States ===
- Almaden Country Day School (San Jose, California)
- Beaver Country Day School (Brookline, Massachusetts)
- Berkshire Country Day School (Stockbridge, Massachusetts)
- Berwick Academy (South Berwick, Maine)
- The Blake School (Minneapolis, Minnesota)
- Bryn Mawr School (Baltimore, Maryland)
- Buckley Country Day School (Roslyn, New York)
- Burgundy Farm Country Day School (Alexandria, Virginia)
- Canton Country Day School (Canton, Ohio)
- Charlotte Country Day School (Charlotte, North Carolina)
- Chico Country Day School (Chico, California)
- Cincinnati Country Day School (Cincinnati, Ohio)
- Columbus Academy (Gahanna, Ohio)
- Community Country Day School (Erie, Pennsylvania)
- The Country Day School (McLean, Virginia)
- The Country School (Madison, Connecticut)
- Crane Country Day School (Santa Barbara, California)
- Dedham Country Day School, (Dedham, Massachusetts)
- Detroit Country Day School (Beverly Hills, Michigan)
- Evansville Day School (Evansville, Indiana)
- Fairfield Country Day School (Fairfield, Connecticut)
- Far Hills Country Day School (Far Hills, New Jersey)
- Foothill Country Day School (Claremont, California)
- Forsyth Country Day School (Lewisville, North Carolina)
- Fort Worth Country Day School (Fort Worth, Texas)
- Fox Chapel Country Day School (Fox Chapel, Pennsylvania)
- Glenelg Country School (Ellicott City, Maryland)
- Green Fields School (Tucson, Arizona)
- Greenwich Country Day School (Greenwich, Connecticut)
- Grove School (Madison, Connecticut
- Hamden Hall Country Day School (Hamden, Connecticut)
- Hawken School (Gates Mills, Ohio)
- Keith Country Day School (Rockford, Illinois)
- Kent Denver School (Cherry Hills Village, Colorado)
- Kentucky Country Day School (Louisville, Kentucky)
- The Key School (Annapolis, Maryland)
- Jacksonville Country Day School (Jacksonville, Florida)
- John Burroughs School (Ladue, Missouri)
- Kingswood-Oxford School (West Hartford, Connecticut)
- La Jolla Country Day School (La Jolla, California)
- Lancaster Country Day School (Lancaster, Pennsylvania)
- Madison Country Day School (Waunakee, Wisconsin)
- Marin Country Day School (Corte Madera, California)
- Mary Institute and St. Louis Country Day School (Ladue, Missouri)
- Masters School (Dobbs Ferry, New York)
- Maumee Valley Country Day School (Toledo, Ohio)
- Memphis University School (Memphis, Tennessee)
- Metairie Park Country Day School (Metairie, Louisiana)
- Miami Country Day School (Miami, Florida)
- Monroe Country Day School (Monroe, Georgia)
- New Canaan Country School (New Canaan, Connecticut)
- Newton Country Day School of the Sacred Heart (Newton, Massachusetts)
- North Shore Country Day School (Winnetka, Illinois)
- The Park School of Buffalo (Amherst, New York)
- Park Tudor School (Indianapolis, Indiana)
- The Pembroke Hill School (Kansas City, Missouri)
- Phoenix Country Day School (Paradise Valley, Arizona)
- Pingry School (Basking Ridge, New Jersey)
- Princeton Day School (Princeton, New Jersey)
- Providence Country Day School (East Providence, Rhode Island)
- Riverdale Country School (Bronx, New York)
- Riverfield Country Day School (Tulsa, Oklahoma)
- Rocky Hill Country Day School (East Greenwich, Rhode Island)
- Roland Park Country School (Baltimore, Maryland)
- Rolling Hills Country Day School (Rolling Hills Estates, California)
- Rumson Country Day School (Rumson, New Jersey)
- Rye Country Day School (Rye, New York)
- Sacramento Country Day School (Sacramento, California)
- St. Paul Academy and Summit School (St. Paul, Minnesota)
- Savannah Country Day School (Savannah, Georgia)
- Scarborough Country Day School (Briarcliff Manor, New York)
- Seacrest Country Day School (Naples, Florida)
- Seattle Country Day School (Seattle, Washington)
- Shady Side Academy (Fox Chapel, Pennsylvania)
- Shore Country Day School (Beverly, Massachusetts)
- St. Johns Country Day School (Orange Park, Florida)
- Stuart Country Day School (Princeton, New Jersey)
- Summit Country Day School (Cincinnati, Ohio)
- The Country School (Madison, Connecticut)
- Upland Country Day School (Kennett Square, Pennsylvania)
- University Liggett School (Grosse Pointe Woods, Michigan)
- University School of Milwaukee (Milwaukee, Wisconsin)
- Wakefield Country Day School (Flint Hill, Virginia)
- Westchester Country Day School (High Point, North Carolina)
- Wooster School (Danbury, Connecticut)
- York Country Day School (York, Pennsylvania)

=== Other countries ===
- Costa Rica Country Day School (San Rafael de Alajuela, Costa Rica)
- The Country Day School (King City, Ontario, Canada)
- Good Hope Country Day School (Kingshill, Saint Croix, U.S. Virgin Islands)
