= Jonathan Dean (ambassador) =

American career diplomat (1924–2014)

Jonathan Dean (June 15, 1924 – January 14, 2014) was an American career diplomat and United States representative for Mutual and Balanced Force Reductions negotiations from 1979 to 1981.

== Biography ==
Dean was born June 15, 1924, in New York City. He attended Riverdale Country School in Yonkers, New York and the then went to Harvard College at age 16. However, his studies were interrupted by World War II. He enlisted in the Canadian Army because he could not enroll in the United States Army without parental consent. After the Normandy Invasion of 1944, he was transferred to the U.S. Army, where he served until the end of World War II. He was wounded while crossing the Rhine river.

Dean returned to New York City at the end of war and received a B.A. from Columbia University in 1948 and an M.A. (1954) and PhD (1973) from George Washington University.

Dean joined the Foreign Service in 1950 and served in Europe. He also served in the Democratic Republic of the Congo in the 1960s, during the brief prime minister-ship of Moïse Tshombe. From 1966 to 1968, he was special assistant to the Counselor of the State Department, and from 1968 to 1972, he was counselor for political affairs in Bonn.

From 1970 to 1972, Dean was deputy U.S. representative to the Berlin negotiations. In 1972 he served as chairman of the Interagency Coordinating Committee for Mutual and Balanced Force Reductions, and in 1973 he was U.S. representative to the preparatory talks for MBFR.

From 1973 to 1978, Dean was deputy U.S. representative to the MBFR negotiations and served as acting representative in 1978.

He was nominated by President Jimmy Carter as representative on January 24, 1979. He was also accorded the rank of ambassador during his time as U.S. representative. He left the post in 1981 and was succeeded by Richard Felix Staar.

He left the United States Foreign Service in 1982 and spent two years at the Carnegie Endowment for International Peace and joined the Union of Concerned Scientists as an advisor.

He made headlines in 2005 for opposing John Bolton's nomination for United States Ambassador to the United Nations. Dean penned a letter in opposition to Bolton and was signed by 62 other diplomats and U.S. officials.

Throughout his career, Dean shared multiple oral histories with the Association of Diplomatic Studies and Training

== Personal life ==
Dean married Theodora George of Darien, Connecticut, who died in January 2012. He died on January 14, 2014, at his home in Mesa, Arizona, and is buried with his wife at Lakeview Cemetery, New Canaan, Connecticut. He is survived by five children and nine grandchildren.

== Bibliography ==
- Hans Günter Brauch, Teri Grimwood: Jonathan Dean. Pioneer in Détende in Europe, Global Cooperative Security, Arms Control and Disarmament, Springer Verlag, Cham/Germany 2014, ISBN 978-3-319-06661-5.
