= Tal Keinan =

Israeli businessman (born 1969)

- טל קיינן
- Born: 1969 (age 56–57); Miami, Florida, United States
- Citizenship: Israeli American
- Education: Georgetown University, Tel Aviv University(A.B.); Harvard Business School (M.B.A.)
- Occupations: Chairman and CEO, Sky Harbour

Tal Keinan (Hebrew: טל קיינן; born in 1969) is an American-born Israeli entrepreneur and financier. He is the Chairman and CEO of Sky Harbour (NYSE: SKYH), a developer of airport infrastructure. He is the co-founder and former CEO of Clarity Capital, a New York and Tel Aviv based investment management firm.

Keinan is also the author of God Is in the Crowd (Random House, 2018), which addresses the future of Judaism and of religion in general.

== Biography ==
Keinan was born in Miami, Florida and studied at Phillips Exeter Academy and the Georgetown School of Foreign Service before emigrating to Israel in 1990 and enlisting in the Israeli Air Force (IAF). He served for 18 years as an operational F-16 pilot and an air combat instructor. He retired from IAF reserves with the rank of lieutenant colonel.

Following his military service, Keinan received an MBA from Harvard Business School. He returned to Israel, serving in the early 2000s as a partner at Israeli Private Equity firm Giza.

== Clarity Capital ==
Keinan is one of the founders of Israel's first full-spectrum asset management firm, Clarity Capital, whose mission is to play a leading role in forging an Israeli financial services industry of global standing, comparable to that of the Israeli technology industry. The firm was established by Keinan in 2005 with David Steinhardt and Jay Pomrenze to embrace opportunities unlocked by capital market reforms introduced by then finance minister Benjamin Netanyahu.

Keinan is a speaker and writer on the Israeli and global economy and is a central figure in the bestselling book about Israel's economic growth, Start-up Nation.

== Sky Harbour ==
Keinan founded Sky Harbour after the publication of God Is in the Crowd, in 2018. Active in civil aviation, Keinan noted a longstanding deficit in business aviation hangar capacity. Sky Harbour is structured as a real estate development company, and aims to “fill the quantitative and qualitative gaps in business aviation home basing.” Sky Harbour established the Home Base Operator (HBO) category in business aviation. The company operates HBO campuses in Miami, Nashville, Houston, Dallas, Denver, Phoenix, Los Angeles, San Jose, and Seattle; and is in development in Bradley CT, Hudson Valley NY, Stewart NY, Trenton NJ, Washington DC (Dulles), Orlando FL, Chicago IL, Salt Lake City UT, Long Beach CA, and Portland OR. The company claims to offer “The Best Home Basing Solution in Aviation, Bar None.”

== Other activity ==
Keinan is active in areas of education, economic development, and Post Trauma. He is the Chairman of Koret Israel Economic Development Funds, a not-for-profit organization providing credit to small and micro businesses. Keinan serves on the Boards of Directors of the Steinhardt Foundation, Heseg Fund, and Reut Institute. He is also linked to the ongoing effort by Dr. Eugene Kandel, chairman of the Israeli Prime Minister's Council of Economic Advisors, to launch a world-class graduate school of finance in Israel. Keinan is among the few Israeli investors active in the Palestinian Authority.

Keinan is author of God Is in the Crowd: Twenty-First-Century Judaism, an original and provocative blueprint for Judaism in the twenty-first century. Presented through the lens of Tal Keinan’s unusual personal story, it is a sobering analysis of the threat to Jewish continuity.
