= Fox Chapel Country Day School =

Coordinates: 40.52648°N 79.89302°W

Shady Side Academy Country Day School
- 620 Squaw Run Road East; Fox Chapel, Pennsylvania; Pittsburgh, Pennsylvania

Information
- Type: Independent coeducational primary day school
- Religious affiliations: As of 1997 the nonsectarian affiliation seems to not be accurate. At monthly school events the entire school goes to a hall at the church for a celebration that includes Christian songs led by a Reverend, historical Episcopal associations
- Established: 1947
- Head of School: Sharon Smith
- Faculty: 18
- Grades: PK–5th
- Enrollment: 135
- Endowment: $2.6 million
- Tuition: $13,100-$18,650 PK $21,475 K $26,350 1st–5th
- Affiliations: National Association of Independent Schools
- Website: https://www.shadysideacademy.org/schools/country-day-school

Fox Chapel Country Day School was a private American elementary school that was founded during the 1940s. Located less than a mile down the road from Shady Side Academy Middle School in Pittsburgh, Pennsylvania, it merged with Shady Side Academy in 2017 to become the academy's second elementary school campus, and overlooks the academy's Senior School athletic complex across the road.

== History ==
Founded in 1948 as Fox Chapel Country Day School (FCCDS), the school began with eighteen children in a nursery school class, housed on the third floor of Fox Chapel Community Church (now Christ Church Fox Chapel). During the 1950s, the search began for a permanent location for the school, and a grade level was added each year to grow the school through fifth grade.

In 1960, Richard K. Whiteman was appointed head of school, a tenure that would last for forty years. In 1970, FCCDS became accredited by the Pennsylvania Association of Private Academic Schools (PAPAS).

While continuing to share space with the church, the school reconfigured the facilities to suit its needs. In 1999, a major addition to join two buildings and create a new space for pre-kindergarten and kindergarten classrooms was completed. The playground was replaced in 2011.

Fox Chapel Country Day School became Shady Side Academy's second elementary campus in 2017 after a merger between the two institutions. Previously known as Fox Chapel Country Day School, the school was renamed Shady Side Academy Country Day School in Fox Chapel beginning with the 2017–2018 school year.
