= Elliott V. Bell =

Elliott Valance Bell (September 25, 1902 – January 11, 1983) was a financial writer for The New York Times who managed the two successful gubernatorial campaigns for his friend, Governor Thomas E. Dewey. He was appointed Superintendent of Banks for the State of New York in 1943 and was also editor and publisher of BusinessWeek.

== Biography ==
A native of New York City, Bell attended DeWitt Clinton High School, graduated from Columbia College in 1925, where he was the president of the Philolexian Society and captain of the fencing team. He started his career as a financial writer at The New York Herald Tribune in 1929 before moving to The New York Times, where he wrote on finance and banking and served on the paper's editorial board in 1941 and 1942.

In 1943, he was appointed Superintendent of Banking by his close friend, New York governor Thomas E. Dewey and served in that position until 1949. As superintendent of banks, he opposed big government spending and excessive regulation.

Bell was a founding member of the New York Financial Writers' Association, which was founded June 15, 1938. He served as the first president of the association.

In 1950, he also became the chairman of the executive committee of McGraw-Hill, Inc. He served as a trustee of Vassar College and was a director of Chase Manhattan Bank, the New York Life Insurance Company, and the New York Telephone Company.

Bell retired from BusinessWeek in 1967. On January 11, 1983, Bell died at his home in Quaker Hill, Pawling, N.Y. at age 80.
