= Costa Rica Country Day School =

Private school in San Rafael, Costa Rica

The Country Day School Costa Rica

Location
- San Rafael, Alajuela; Costa Rica

Information
- Type: Private, Day
- Motto: An American School Serving the International Community "Courage to Grow"
- Established: 1963
- Director: Mr. Jack Young
- Faculty: Approx. 75
- Grades: PK-12
- Enrollment: 800
- Mascot: Panther
- Information: (506) 2289-0919
- Website: https://www.nordangliaeducation.com/cds-costa-rica

The Country Day School Costa Rica (CDS) is a school in San Rafael de Alajuela, Costa Rica.

== Foundation and History ==
The school was founded in 1963 by Woodson Brown and his wife Sonia, in Zapote in order to provide an American college preparatory education in Costa Rica. It started off as a small institution, and has since grown into a large school enrolling approximately 800 students. It has since had two other campuses, one built partially from the old United States Embassy in Escazu, and as of 2016, the (current) one in San Rafael de Alajuela. CDS is a member of the Association of the Association of American Schools in Central America (AASCA).

== San Rafael de Alajuela, Hacienda Espinal Campus ==
The Country Day School (CDS) is a private K-12, English-speaking school located in San Rafael de Alajuela, Hacienda Espinal, a westerly suburb of San José, Costa Rica. CDS is recognized as having one of the highest college acceptance rates in the country, with most students attending schools in the United States.

In 2016, the school moved from the original campus located in Escazú to the newly built, LEED-certified campus located in San Rafael de Alajuela, Hacienda Espinal.

It is considered to be Costa Rica's most exclusive school.
