= Gerard Koeppel =

American author and historian (born 1975)

- Born: 1975 (age 50–51); United States
- Education: Riverdale Country School
- Alma mater: Wesleyan University
- Occupations: Author and historian

Gerard Koeppel is an American author and historian, with a focus on New York infrastructure. He has written three books—Water for Gotham: A History (Princeton University Press, 2000), Bond of Union: Building the Erie Canal and the American Nation (Da Capo Press, 2009); and City on a Grid: How New York Became New York (Da Capo Press, 2015)—and contributed to numerous other books, including The Encyclopedia of New York City, of which he was an associate editor of the second edition. City on a Grid was a winner of a 2015 New York City Book Award and was named one of Planetizen's top 10 urban planning books of 2015. Koeppel has written opinion pieces for the New York Times, the New York Daily News, and other print and online publications. He writes and speaks regularly about aspects of New York history. He is a graduate of Wesleyan University, where he was deeply influenced by professors V.S. Naipaul and Phyllis Rose. He has been a charter sailboat captain, a New York City cabdriver, and radio journalist, including a dozen years at CBS News.
