= Riverdale Country School =

Location
- 5250 Fieldston Road (Hill Campus); 1 Spaulding Lane (River Campus); The Bronx, New York 10471; United States; 40°53′59″N 73°54′03″W

Information
- Type: Private, Day, College-prep
- Motto: Mind, Character, Community
- Established: 1907
- Founder: Frank S. Hackett
- Head of school: Kari Ostrem
- Grades: PreK–5 at the River Campus; 6–12 at the Hill Campus
- Enrollment: 1200
- Campus: Suburban, 27.5 acres (111,289 m^{2})
- Colors: Maroon and Grey
- Athletics conference: Ivy Prep; NYSAISAA
- Mascot: Falcon
- Accreditation: New York State Association of Independent Schools
- Newspaper: The Riverdale Review
- Yearbook: The Riverdalian
- Tuition: $57,140 (2025-26)
- Website: www.riverdale.edu

Riverdale Country School is a co-educational, independent, college-preparatory day school in New York City serving pre-kindergarten through twelfth grade. It is located on two campuses covering more than 27.5 acres (111,000 m^{2}) in the Riverdale section of the Bronx, New York, United States. Started as a school for boys, Riverdale Country School became fully coeducational in 1972. It currently serves 1,140 students. According to Niche's 2026 Private School Rankings, Riverdale is ranked the 2nd-best private K–12 school in the United States.

== History ==
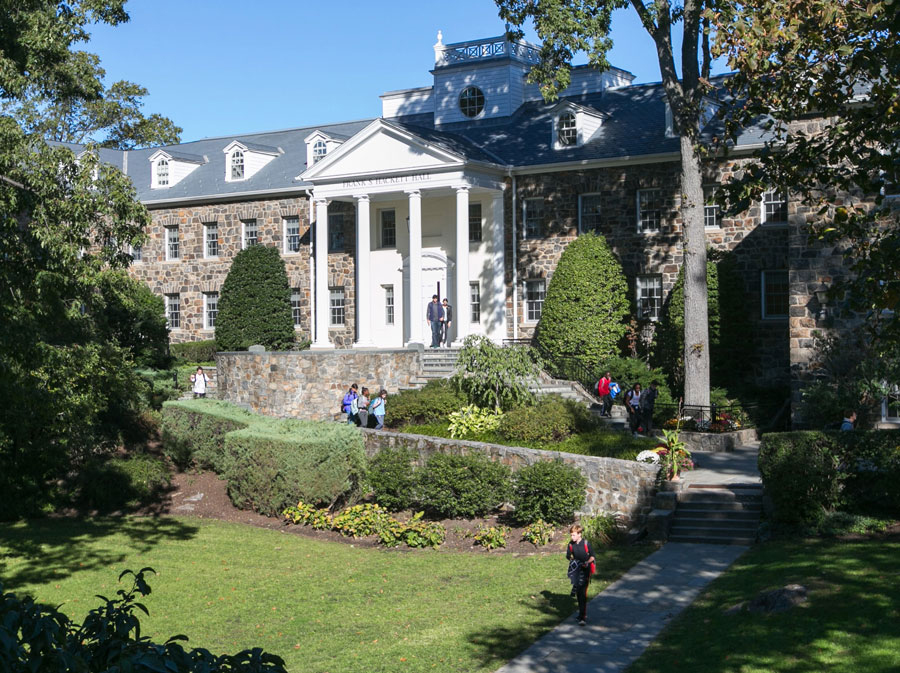
Hackett Hall on the Hill Campus of Riverdale Country School

Founded in 1907 by Frank Sutliff Hackett and his first wife, Francis Dean (Allen) Hackett, Riverdale Country School is one of the oldest country day schools in the United States. Originally known as the Riverdale School for Boys, it began with 12 students and four teachers and promised scholarly, intimate teaching amid abundant recreational space. Describing his school as "an American experiment in education," Hackett later told The New York Times: "We have tried to transform schools from mere nurseries of the brain into a means of nourishing the whole boy—mind, body, and spirit."

An early advocate of outdoor experiences for young people, Hackett started a summer camp known as Camp Riverdale at Long Lake in the Adirondacks to provide summer recreation for his students. By 1920, Hackett had acquired three acres on Fieldston Road for the school and built a classroom building and dormitory. The 100-room dormitory, designed by McKim, Mead, and White, later became known as Hackett Hall. In 1924, he started the Neighborhood School for boys and girls from grades one to three, and in 1933, the Riverdale Girls School. By World War II, the school attracted both day students and boarders; one student in six or seven came from another country.

Hackett dreamed of expanding the school into an "American World School" and acquired a new site in Riverdale. In 1948, Dwight Eisenhower, then president of Columbia University, spoke at a dedication ceremony at the site. Hackett died before his dream was realized, and the property was sold. In 1972, the Boys and Girls Schools were combined. In 1985, the Middle and Upper Schools were consolidated on the Hill Campus and the Lower School moved to the River Campus. Hackett was an organizer of the Guild of Independent Schools of New York City, and an organizer and president of the Adirondack Mountain Club.

President John F. Kennedy attended the school from 1927 to 1930 when his family lived in Riverdale. During the 1960 presidential campaign, Kennedy made an appearance in the Bronx. "I said up the street that I was a former resident of the Bronx," he said. "Nobody believes that, but it is true. No other candidate for the presidency can make that statement."

== In the media ==
Past decades have seen media coverage of Riverdale's racist rhetoric in the 1960s and heavy ideological slant around 2020.

In 2018, Riverdale was in the news for cancelling an Israel-Palestine seminar, purportedly forcing out a teacher who had taught at the school for over 25 years, even though parents stated that he welcomed debate. In a Huffington Post article, titled "How An Elite New York City Prep School Created A Safe Space For Angry Zionists," board members Tal Keinan, Dan Rosen, Seth Berger, and David Westin were reported to have used their status as donors and board members to organize meetings with the Headmaster and pressure him to fire another teacher. The article notes,

"By HuffPost’s calculations, the parents who received the May 30 email had donated upward of $500,000 to Riverdale in the 2016–17 fiscal year alone. (The 2017–18 report has not yet been released.) Because the school lists only funding ranges for donations in its annual report, it is possible the total is far greater. Specifically, an individual or couple is listed as having given anywhere between $10,000 and $24,999, $25,000 to $49,999, over $50,000 and so on — meaning one year’s worth of their donations could easily have surpassed seven figures."

In 2022, media reported that Richard Blumenthal, a senator from Connecticut, had helped establish Riverdale Country School's “Slave Day” when he was president of the student council in 1962. The students performed menial tasks to fund a scholarship for “an especially deserving” foreign student to attend Riverdale. The name of the initiative was soon changed to "Freedom Work Day," and the money given to the NAACP.

Riverdale also attracted attention in 2021, for allegedly teaching students to monitor each other in order to determine if they were practicing "allyship" sufficiently, which meant that those perceived as non-compliant would be reported to school administrators. The practice, introduced as a replacement for the Pledge of Allegiance, caused Bion Bartning to withdraw his children from the school, protesting "a kind of religion taking hold in American education that forces people into categories according to their race." Groups of parents had been protesting the school's practice of "leftist indoctrination" in 2019.

== Campuses ==
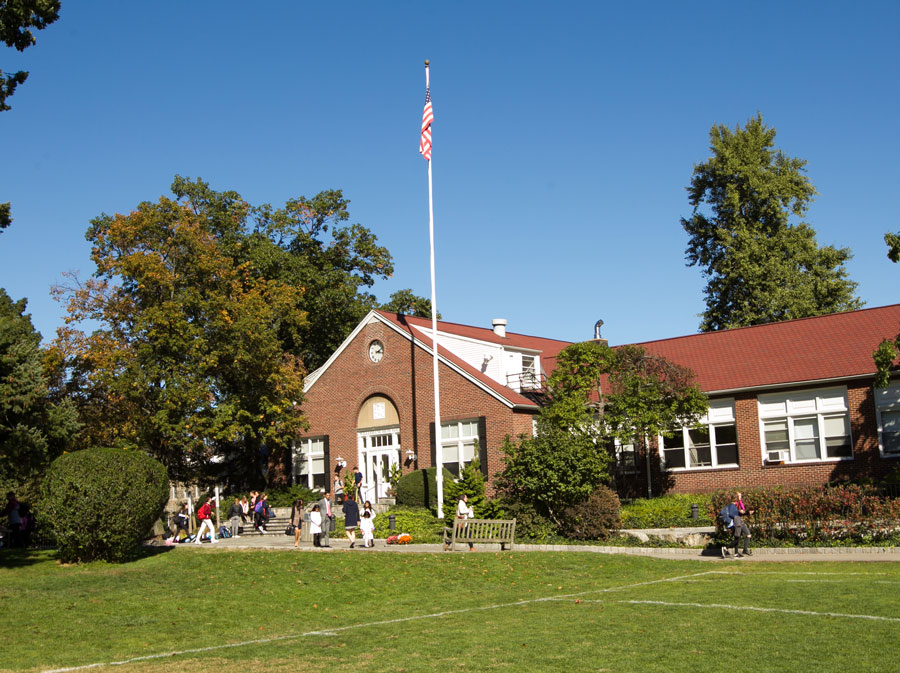
Mow Hall on the Hill Campus of Riverdale Country School

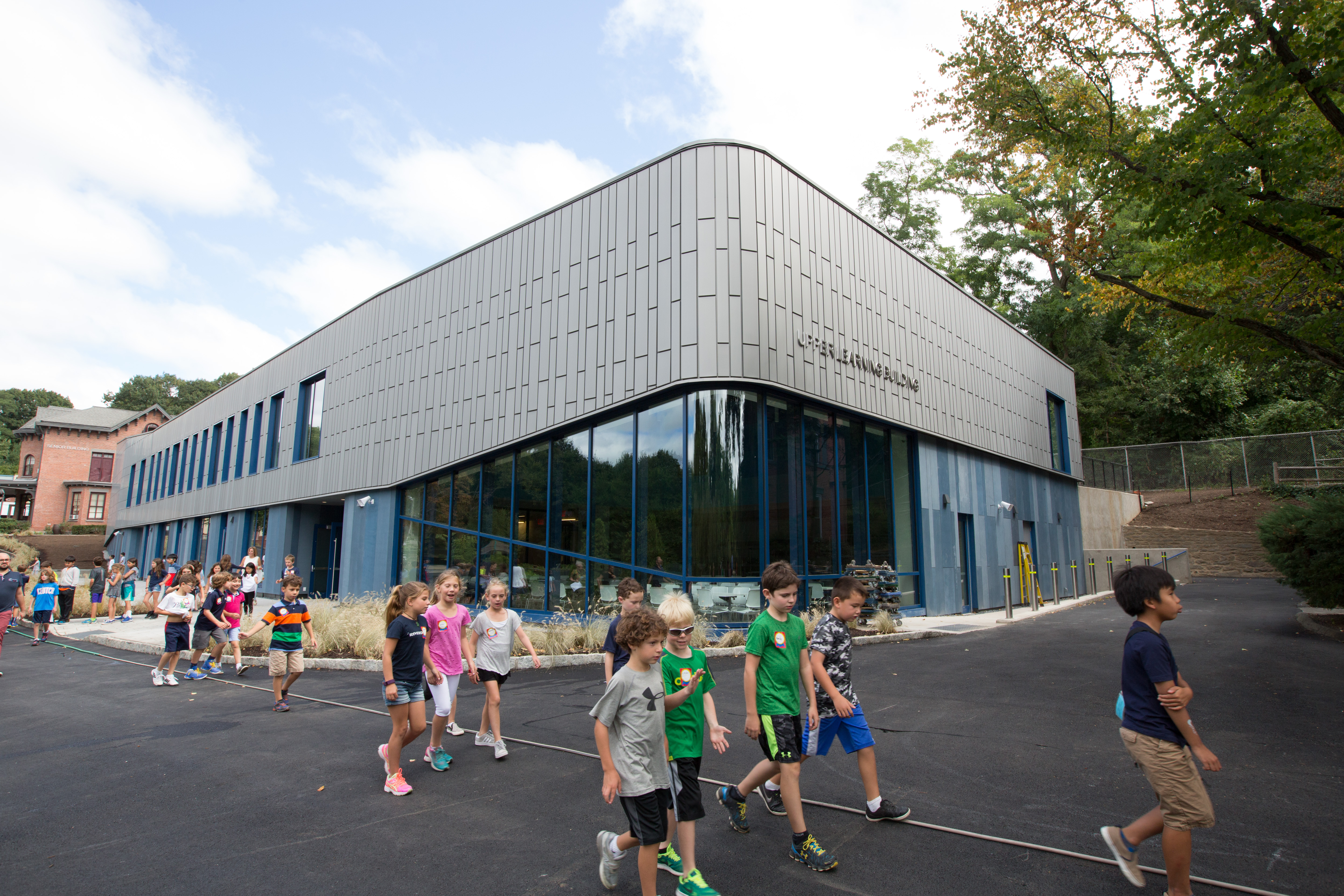
The Upper Learning Building, completed in 2016, on the River Campus of Riverdale Country School

Covering 19.5 acres (79,000 m^{2}), the Hill Campus is located on Fieldston Road, overlooking Van Cortlandt Park. It is home to the Middle School (6th to 8th) and the Upper School (9th to 12th).

The River Campus (Pre-K to 5th) sits on 8 acres (32,000 m^{2}) along the Hudson River. The buildings on the River Campus are the Early Learning Building (Pre-K through second grade classrooms and the gymnasium), the Senior Building (classrooms for drawing, painting, and sculpture), the Admissions/Junior building (includes the Lower School head's office, the Learning Commons, and Admissions, and the Upper Learning Building. The land for the River Campus was given to Riverdale by the family of George Walbridge Perkins.

== Academics ==
In addition to college-preparatory courses in math, science, and humanities, Riverdale offers "maker" programs that combine science, technology, engineering, arts, and mathematics, as well as courses in robotics and coding. Latin, Greek, French, Spanish, Chinese, and Japanese also are offered. Interdisciplinary courses in the Lower, Middle, and Upper Schools encourage students to draw connections across disciplines. Integrated Liberal Studies is required of seniors and concentrates on virtue, the self, social justice, and the environment. Independent projects are also considered.

Riverdale is chartered by the New York State Board of Regents and is accredited by the New York State Association of Independent Schools.

== Athletics ==
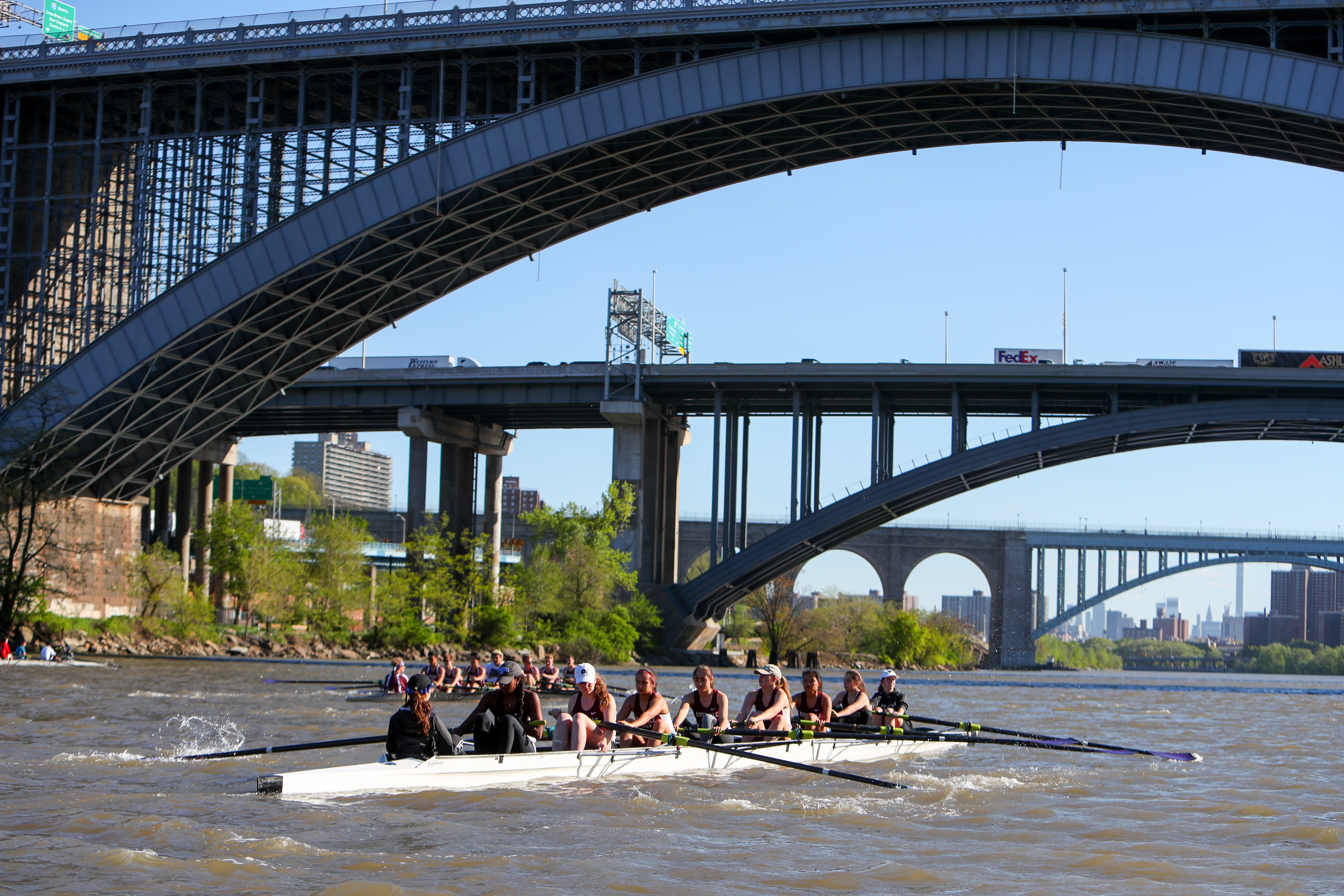
Riverdale's Girls' Varsity Crew Team

As of 2017, Riverdale has a total of 31 varsity interscholastic sports teams, many of which also have junior varsity counterparts except for cross country, crew, golf, track and field, squash and swimming. In the spring of 2013, crew was introduced as a varsity sport for boys and girls, while wrestling was officially cut from the list of sports.

Fall sports

- Cross Country
- Fencing Club
- Football
- Soccer
- Field Hockey
- Girls' Tennis
- Volleyball

Winter sports

- Basketball
- Fencing
- Ice Hockey
- Squash
- Swimming

Spring sports

- Baseball
- Softball
- Crew
- Golf
- Lacrosse
- Boys' Tennis
- Track and Field
- Ultimate Frisbee

=== Awards ===
In 2014, Riverdale was awarded the National Athletic Trainers' Association Safe School Award and was declared a National Youth Sports Health & Safety Institute "Best Practices Partner." In 2016, Riverdale was awarded the New York Athletic Training Association's Joseph Abraham Award, which is an award given annually to high schools that provide outstanding athletic injury care to their student athletes.

== Student life ==
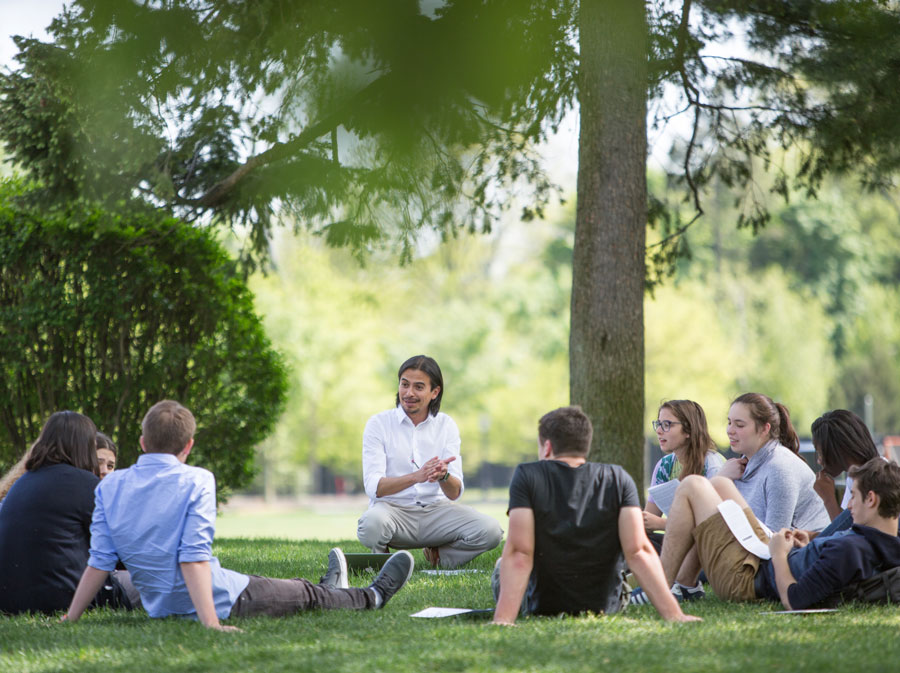
Jones Lawn on the Hill Campus

=== Arts and activities ===
Upper School students produce one musical and one play each year in the Jeslo Harris Theatre. Riverdale students may participate in the jazz and concert bands, orchestra, chamber music ensembles, chorus, dance team, and the a cappella singing groups, the Rivertones and Testostertones. More than 40 student-led clubs, organizations, and service-learning partnerships are offered.

=== Student publications ===
The Riverdale Review is Riverdale's student-run paper. Impressions has published the visual art and creative writing of students in the Upper School for almost 30 years. Crossroads is Riverdale’s Middle School Literary and Art Magazine. The Falcon Times is the newsletter of the Middle School. Riverdale's faculty and student body also maintain an online non-fiction literary magazine called The Riverdale Reader.

== Notable alumni ==
See List of Riverdale Country School alumni

== Notable staff ==
Nathan M. Pusey, president of Harvard University, (1953–1971) taught at Riverdale Country School as did Victor L. Butterfield, president of Wesleyan University (1943–1967).

== Associations ==
Riverdale is a member of the Ivy Preparatory School League and the New York State Association of Independent Schools.

Riverdale Country School, Ethical Culture Fieldston School, and Horace Mann School together are known as the "Hill Schools," as all three are located within two miles (3 km) of each other in the neighborhood of Riverdale on a hilly area above Van Cortlandt Park.
